= Instupendo =

American music producer

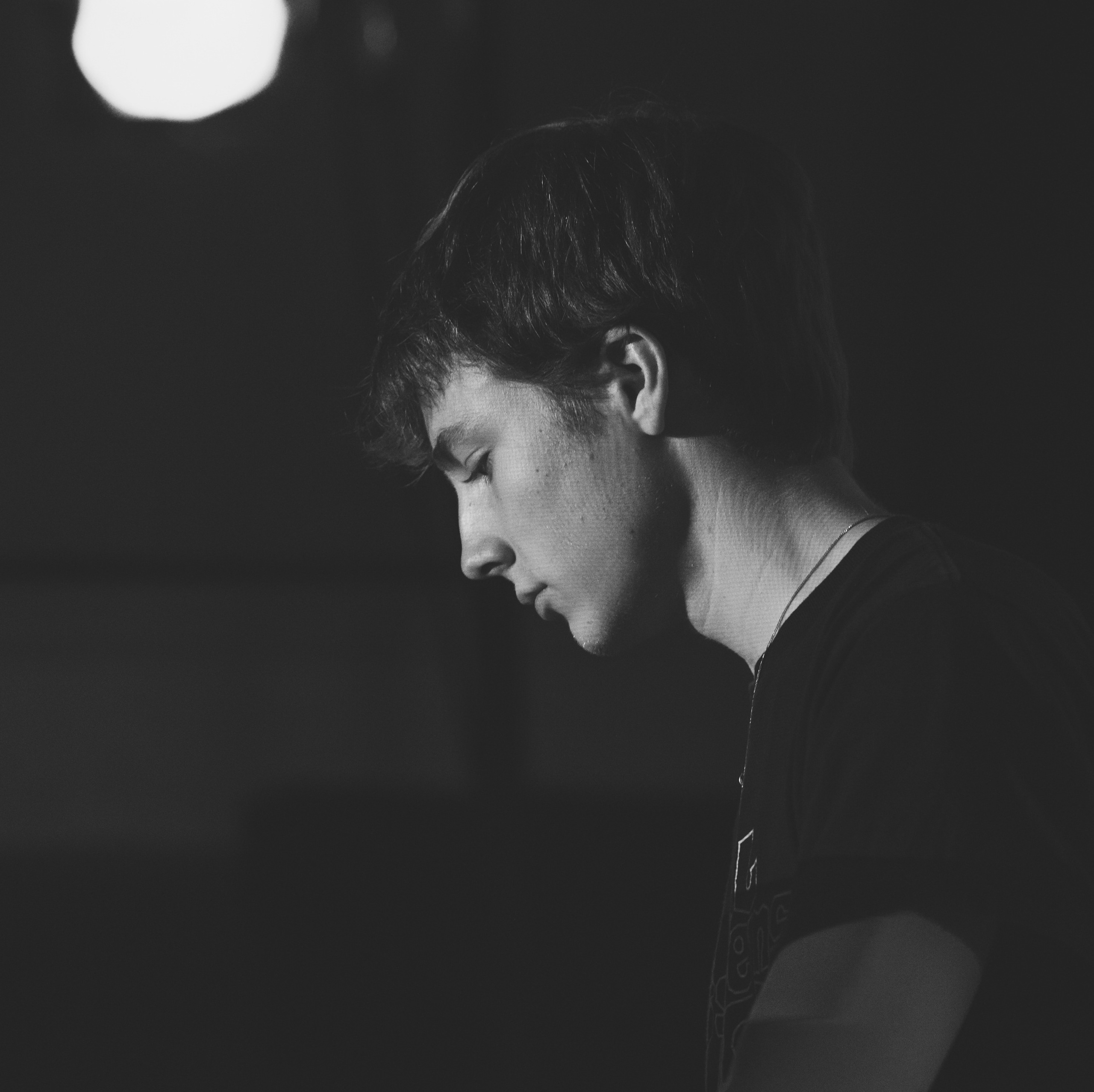
- Instupendo in 2016

Background information
- Born: Aidan Penn Peterson
- Website: www.instupendo.com

Aidan Penn Peterson, professionally known as Instupendo, is an American music producer, composer and recording artist working primarily in electronic, experimental pop, art pop, electro pop and ambient genres. He has released numerous albums and EPs and collaborated with artists such as Rostam, Benny Sings, and Teen Daze. He was also nominated for the Best Engineered Album at the 2023 Grammy Awards.

== Biography ==
Raised in Philadelphia, Peterson began his music career releasing tracks on SoundCloud, including the singles "Six Forty Seven" and "Long Live." He followed by releasing multiple EPs and collaborated with artists including Roy Blair, Maxwell Young, Lontalius Rostam, Benny Sings, and Teen Daze prior to the release of his first album, Love Power A-to-Z in 2021.

Peterson was featured on the track "50-50" on the 2019 Toro y Moi album Outer Peace, which peaked at No. 13 on the Top Alternative Albums. In 2023, his song "Comfort Chain" was used by Jvke in the song "This Is What Heartbreak Feels Like." The same year he was nominated for Best Engineered Album at the 65th Annual Grammy Awards for his work on the BAYNK album Adolescence. He collaborated again with BAYNK in 2024 for the single "Grin," a song that made the top 30 Aotearoa Music Global Impact List.

In 2025, Peterson released Ripstupendo, a collaborative album with the production collective Ripsquad.

== Discography ==
=== Studio albums ===
List of studio albums with selected details
Title	Details
Love Power A-to-Z	Released: 2021; Label: Self-released
Ripstupendo	Released: 2025; Label: Self-released; Collaboration with production collective Ripsquad
Coral Snow	Released: 2026; Label: Self-released

List of EPs with selected details
Title	Details
An Instupendo Collection	Released: 2016; Label: Self-released
Friend of a Friend	Released: 2017; Label: Self-released
Faces I Know (Remixed)	Released: 2018; Label: Self-released
Faces I Know	Released: 2018; Label: Self-released
Bbg Remixed:R	Released: 2019; Label: Self-released
Boys by Girls	Released: 2019; Label: Self-released

=== Live albums ===
List of live albums with selected details
Title	Details
Instupendo: Live From The Backrooms (DJ Mix)	Released: 2026; Label: A24 Music

=== Singles ===
==== As solo artist ====
List of singles with selected details
Title	Year	Peaks	Album
Title	Year	US	Album
"Oomph"	2015		
"Icarus"	2016	—	
"Light Lock"	2016		
"Falling"	2016		
"Wisp"	2016		
"Beauty Unit"	2016		
"Six Forty Seven"	2016		
"Comfort Chain"	2017		
"Cinderella - Alternative Version" (feat Ryan Hemsworth)	2019	—	
"Kissout, KO with Ripsquad"	2023		
"Gin" with Ripsquad	2025		

==== As producer / composer ====
List of singles with selected details
Title	Year	Peaks	Certifications	Artist
Title	Year	US	Certifications	Artist
"Please You"	2015			Maurice Moore
"Can't Sleep"	2017	—		Luke Christopher
"Grow Up"	2017			Roy Blair
"Grand Theft Auto"	2017			Roy Blair
"How Does It Feel" (feat Cosmo's Midnight)	2021			BAYNK
"This Is What Heartbreak Feels Like"	2022	—	* RIAA: Platinum	Jvke
"Normal" (feat Emilia Ali)	2022			Beau Diako
"Centauri"	2022			Rei Brown
"Next Try"	2022			Golden Vessel
"Ready, Set, Go"	2022			Cedric Madden
"Imperfect"	2022			Cedric Madden
"Grin"	2024			BAYNK

==== As featured artist ====
List of singles with selected details
Title	Year	Peaks	Artist
Title	Year	US	Artist
"50-50"	2019		Toro y Moi
"Get a Life"	2020	—	RAC
"Yearbook" (feat Harry Teardrop)	2020		James Ivy
"Forget Me Not"	2020		MISOGI
"Ribbon Bone [Silk Chaser]"	2021		Oli XL

==== Remixes ====
List of singles with selected details
Title	Year	Peaks	Artist
Title	Year	US	Artist
"History"	2017	—	Cosmos Midnight
"Unusual" (feat MNDR)	2017		RAC
"Half-Light"	2018	—	Rostam
"Old Home Not Yet Built"	2026	—	Kane Parsons; Edo Van Breemen

== Awards and nominations ==
Year	Award	Category	Nominee / work	Result	Ref.
2023	65th Annual Grammy Awards	Best Engineered Album	"Adolescence" (BAYNK)	Nominated	
