= Signals (Madeline Kenney EP) =

EP by Madeline Kenney
- Released: June 1, 2016
- Genre: Indie rock
- Length: 18:17
- Label: Company
- Producer: Chaz Bear

Madeline Kenney chronology
Signals (2016)	Night Night at the First Landing (2017)

Signals is the debut extended play by American singer-songwriter Madeline Kenney. The EP was released on June 1, 2016, by Company Records.

== Background ==
Signals was written by Kenney and was produced by Chaz Bear, who is also known as Toro y Moi. The songs in the EP were described as "twang-hazy dream pop".

== Track listing ==
No.	Title	Length
1.	"Signals"	4:12
2.	"Thursdaze"	5:36
3.	"Delicate"	3:23
4.	"Make Like Him"	6:05
Total length:		18:17
