= Michael (Les Sins album) =

Studio album by Les Sins
- Released: November 4, 2014
- Studio: Chaz Bear's home studio
- Genre: Electronic
- Length: 40:09
- Label: Company Records

Chaz Bear chronology
| Anything in Return (2013) | Michael (2014) | What For? (2015) |

Michael is a 2014 album by American musician Chaz Bear under the name Les Sins. All albums by Bear prior to the release of Michael were under the stage name Toro y Moi. The album is almost entirely instrumental, with only one song, "Why," having guest vocals from Nate Salman.

== Background ==
On the Bandcamp page for Les Sins, it states that Michael was inspired "by cartoon and movie soundtracks" as well as "house, techno, French electronic, and ’90s hip-hop production." Bear began producing the album after a slight burnout of doing R&B-style songs; the album took two years to produce.

== Critical reception ==
Upon release, Michael received positive reviews. The largest publication to review the album, Pitchfork, gave the album a 6.6 out of 10, stating that the album "finds [Bear] turning away from his thin, genial voice and natural melodic gifts, choosing instead to embrace rhythm and lean, shadowy beat construction."

Professional ratings
Review scores
| Source | Rating |
|---|---|
| Pitchfork | 6.6/10 |
| AllMusic | 3.5/5 stars |
| The Early Registration | 7/10 |
| The Line of Best Fit | 8.5/10 |
| Spectrum Culture | 3.75/5 |
| MusicOMH | 3/5 stars |

== Track listing ==
All tracks are written by Chaz Bear.

Michael track listing
| No. | Title | Length |
|---|---|---|
| 1. | "Talk About" | 3:54 |
| 2. | "Past" | 2:33 |
| 3. | "Toy" | 4:00 |
| 4. | "Why" (featuring Nate Salman) | 4:03 |
| 5. | "Bother" | 3:44 |
| 6. | "Minato" | 3:44 |
| 7. | "Bellow" | 4:22 |
| 8. | "Sticky" | 3:35 |
| 9. | "Call" | 3:34 |
| 10. | "Drop" | 3:04 |
| 11. | "Do Right" | 3:29 |
| Total length: | | 40:09 |
