= June 2009 (album) =

Compilation album by Toro y Moi
- Released: April 24, 2012
- Recorded: June 2009
- Genre: Electronic; pop; indie pop; indie rock
- Length: 28:51
- Label: Carpark
- Producer: Chaz Bundick

Toro y Moi chronology
| Underneath the Pine (2011) | June 2009 (2012) | Anything in Return (2013) |

Professional ratings
Aggregate scores
| Source | Rating |
|---|---|
| Metacritic | 66/100 |
Review scores
| Source | Rating |
| AllMusic | 3.5/5 stars |
| The A.V. Club | B+ |
| Clash | 6/10 |
| Consequence of Sound | 2.5/5 stars |
| Drowned in Sound | 4/10 |
| musicOMH | 3/5 stars |
| Pitchfork | 6.0/10 |
| Spin | 7/10 |
| This Is Fake DIY | 6/10 |
| Under the Radar | 6/10 stars |

June 2009 is a compilation album by American recording artist Toro y Moi, released on April 24, 2012, by Carpark Records. Originally sold as a tour-only CD-R, it consists of previously unreleased material produced and recorded by Bundick in June 2009, before his debut studio album, Causers of This (2010), was recorded. Aside from standard CD and digital versions, the album was also released as a limited edition box set containing five 7" vinyl singles, each with their own cover art, as well as a free digital download, postcard, and stickers.

== Track listing ==
All tracks are written by Chaz Bundick.

| No. | Title | Length |
|---|---|---|
| 1. | "Best Around" | 1:28 |
| 2. | "Take the L to Leave" | 2:22 |
| 3. | "Girl Problems" | 2:42 |
| 4. | "Dead Pontoon" | 2:23 |
| 5. | "Ektelon" | 3:19 |
| 6. | "Drive South" | 3:38 |
| 7. | "Sad Sams" | 2:55 |
| 8. | "Talamak" (First Version) | 3:45 |
| 9. | "Warm Frames" | 2:40 |
| 10. | "New Loved Ones" | 3:39 |
