= A Girl Like You =

A Girl Like You or Girl Like You may refer to:

- "A Girl Like You" (Edwyn Collins song)
- "A Girl Like You" (Easton Corbin song)
- "A Girl Like You" (Cliff Richard and The Shadows song)
- "A Girl Like You" (Dallas Smith song)
- "A Girl Like You" (The Smithereens song)
- "Girl Like You" (Jason Aldean song)
- "Girl Like You" (Toro y Moi song)
- "A Girl Like You" (The Young Rascals song)
- "A Girl Like You", a song by Aaliyah featuring Treach from One in a Million
- "A Girl Like You", a song by The Wolfgang Press
- "Girl Like You", by Smash Mouth from Summer Girl

== See also ==
- A Girl Like Me (disambiguation)
- "Girls Like You", a song by Maroon 5
- Girls Like You (disambiguation)
- "With a Girl Like You", a 1966 song by the Troggs
- "With a Girl Like You", My Lady Jane episode
- "Never Met A Girl Like You Before", a 1965 song by the Kinks released as the B-side of "See My Friends"
