= So Many Details =

Single by Toro y Moi

from the album Anything in Return
- B-side: "So Many Details (Remix)"
- Released: October 15, 2012
- Recorded: 2012
- Genre: Indie pop; R&B
- Length: 4:45
- Label: Carpark
- Songwriter: Chaz Bundick
- Producer: Chaz Bundick

Toro y Moi singles chronology
"I Will Talk to You" (2011)	"So Many Details" (2012)	"Say That" (2013)

"So Many Details" is a song recorded by American singer-songwriter Toro y Moi. The song was released on October 15, 2012 through Carpark Records, as the lead single from his third studio album Anything in Return (2013). Toro y Moi is the recording project of musician Chaz Bundick, who wrote, produced, engineered, mixed, and performed all instrumentation on the track.

== Background ==
Bundick, in an announcement accompanying the song's release, called it an attempt "to make sincere pop music that’s not all processed and bubblegum."

The song was first shared on SoundCloud on October 15, 2012; a special 7-inch single containing a remix of the song with Odd Future's Hodgy Beats saw release on Black Friday Record Store Day on November 23 of that year. This combination was made available for digital download on December 3, 2012. The song's music video, shot by directing duo HARRYS and photographed in the Hamptons, was uploaded on December 12, 2012. The video stars Bundick and actress Sarah Stephens; writer Jeremy D. Larson described its concept: "[The clip features] Bundick staring despondently into the camera recalling the all the many details of an equally despondent lady."

== Reception ==
Ian Cohen at Pitchfork felt the song "marks another leap in [Toro y Moi's] songwriting and production by way of working in the art of seduction." Sam Weiss at Complex considered it more upbeat than his previous work, calling it "distinctly Bundick, spacey production and all." Jamie Milton, writing for DIY called its varying instrumentation "distracting in its sheer novelty, but after a few listens everything slots into place, every previously conflicting element feels like it belongs." Stereogum's Corban Goble found it "one of the weirdest things [Bundick's] ever done." Drew Millard at Vice described the tune as "a slow burn, fusing spacey Quiet Storm with the electronics of his first album, Causers of This. Think Ennio Morricone, crossed with Drake's "Marvins Room", at a syrup-sippingly slow pace."

== Personnel ==
Credits adapted from the liner notes of Anything in Return.

- Chaz Bundick – design, engineering, layout, mixing, performer, production
- Patrick Brown – engineering, mixing
- Jorge Hernandez – second engineering
- Joe Lambert – mastering
