= Mahal (Toro y Moi album) =

Studio album by Toro y Moi
- Released: April 29, 2022
- Genre: Psych-funk
- Length: 40:36
- Label: Dead Oceans
- Producer: Chaz Bear

Toro y Moi chronology
Soul Trash (2019)	Mahal (2022)	Hole Erth (2024)

Singles from Mahal
- 1. "Postman" / "Magazine" Released: January 26, 2022; 2. "The Loop" Released: February 22, 2022; 3. "Déjà Vu" Released: April 1, 2022

Professional ratings
Aggregate scores
Source	Rating
Metacritic	78/100
Review scores
Source	Rating
Pitchfork	7.5/10
theneedledrop	7/10
The Guardian	3/5 stars
NME	4/5 stars
Clash	8/10
Allmusic	4/5 stars

Mahal is the seventh studio album by American musician Toro y Moi, released on April 29, 2022, through Dead Oceans, as his first release under this label. The title is derived from the Tagalog word "mahal", which translates to "love" or "expensive" in English.

== Background ==
The album draws inspiration from Chaz Bear's maternal Filipino heritage. Growing up, he held closer ties to his mother's family than his father's, feeling that his Black heritage was "overlooked" by both himself and others until he began making music. After recording a first iteration of the album, Bear took time to rethink the vision of the record, incorporating the automotive theme that is present on the final version. This theme was inspired by Bear's love of jeepneys, repurposed military jeeps left behind after the American colonization of the Philippines, now a common mode of transportation in the country. For the rollout of the album, Bear purchased a jeepney which he drove to fan meetup events while unable to tour due to the COVID-19 pandemic. The jeepney is also featured on the cover of the album.

== Release, promotion, marketing ==
The album was preceded by three single releases. The dual singles "Postman" and "Magazine", the latter featuring Salami Rose Joe Louis were released on January 26, 2022, alongside their music videos and details of the album release. Next were "The Loop" and "Déjà Vu", released on February 22 and April 1, respectively, with music videos for each published on the day of release.

After purchasing the jeepney used on the cover of the album, Bear filmed a 12-minute short film, titled Goes By So Fast: a MAHAL Film, starring himself and comedian Eric André, directed by frequent collaborator Harry Israelson. In the film, André drives a jeepney to San Francisco, picking up Bear, whose car has broken down on the way to a performance amid a heatwave. Songs from the album soundtrack the pair's journey, played on the radio and sung by Bear himself. Interspersed throughout the film are clips of Bear restoring and transporting the jeepney after its purchase, and explaining the significance of the jeepney in the Philippines. The film was released on June 1, 2022. Bear expressed that with the film, he desired to create a lighthearted visual to contrast the more serious nature of the album.

The album was released on April 29, 2022, debuting at 167 on the US Billboard 200 Chart, 30 on the Top Rock Albums Chart, and 20 on the Independent Albums Chart remaining on each for one week.

== Critical reception ==
According to the review aggregator Metacritic, Mahal received "generally favorable reviews" based on a weighted average score of 78 out of 100 from 8 critic scores. Critics praised the album's relaxed, psychedelic sound, drawing parallels to the 2015 album What For?. Writing for Pitchfork, Marc Hogan described the album as "filled with jubilant funk-star yawps, goofier and more open than his previous full-lengths". Critics also noted improvements in Bear's lyricism, with Dhruva Balram describing the lyrics as "precise without needing the artist needing to explain himself further, allowing the listener to interpret them as they please" for NME. In a mixed review for The Guardian, Phil Mongredien criticized the "half-baked" nature of some songs, stating "Mahal is ultimately too uneven to be an album to particularly cherish", while praising the composition of tracks "Days in Love" and "Goes By So Fast".

== Track listing ==
Mahal track listing
No.	Title	Writer(s)	Length
1.	"The Medium" (featuring Unknown Mortal Orchestra)	Toro y Moi	3:07
2.	"Goes by So Fast"	Toro y Moi	3:41
3.	"Magazine" (featuring Salami Rose Joe Louis)	Toro y Moi & Salami Rose Joe Louis	3:11
4.	"Postman"	Toro y Moi	2:40
5.	"The Loop"	Toro y Moi	4:01
6.	"Last Year"	Toro y Moi	3:15
7.	"Mississippi"	Toro y Moi	1:56
8.	"Clarity" (featuring Sofie Royer)	Toro y Moi	3:59
9.	"Foreplay"	Toro y Moi	3:17
10.	"Déjà Vu"	Toro y Moi	2:42
11.	"Way Too Hot"	Toro y Moi	2:46
12.	"Millennium" (featuring The Mattson 2)	Toro y Moi	3:01
13.	"Days in Love"	Toro y Moi	3:00
Total length:			40:36

Japanese edition bonus track
No.	Title	Writer(s)	Length
14.	"Crude Oil"	Toro y Moi	3:25
Total length:			44:07

== Personnel ==
Credits adapted from album artwork.

=== Musicians ===
- Chaz Bear – bass (all tracks), keyboard (1–2, 4, 6, 8–10, 12–13), drums (2–4, 6–7, 9–10), guitar (2–9, 13), vocals (2–7, 9–11, 13), synthesizer (2), piano (11)
- Andy Woodward – drums (1)
- Ruban Nielson – guitar (1)
- Martín Perna – saxophone (2), flute (2, 8)
- Doug Stuart – bass (2), keyboard (5)
- Matt Schory – drums (2, 5, 13)
- Lindsay Olsen – keyboard (3), vocals (3)
- Cheflee – drums (3)
- Anthony Ferraro – drums (6)
- Shaun Lowecki – drums (8)
- Sofie Royer – vocals (8)
- Dylan Lee – guitar (10)
- Lucky Banks – drums (11)
- Hannah van Loon – guitar (11)
- Jonathan Mattson – drums (12)
- Jared Mattson – guitar (12)
- Alan Palomo – synthesizer (12)

== Charts ==
Chart performance for Mahal
Chart (2022)	Peak position
Scottish Albums (Official Charts)	62
UK Independent Albums (Official Charts)	25
US Billboard 200	167
