= Salami Rose Joe Louis =

American pop musician

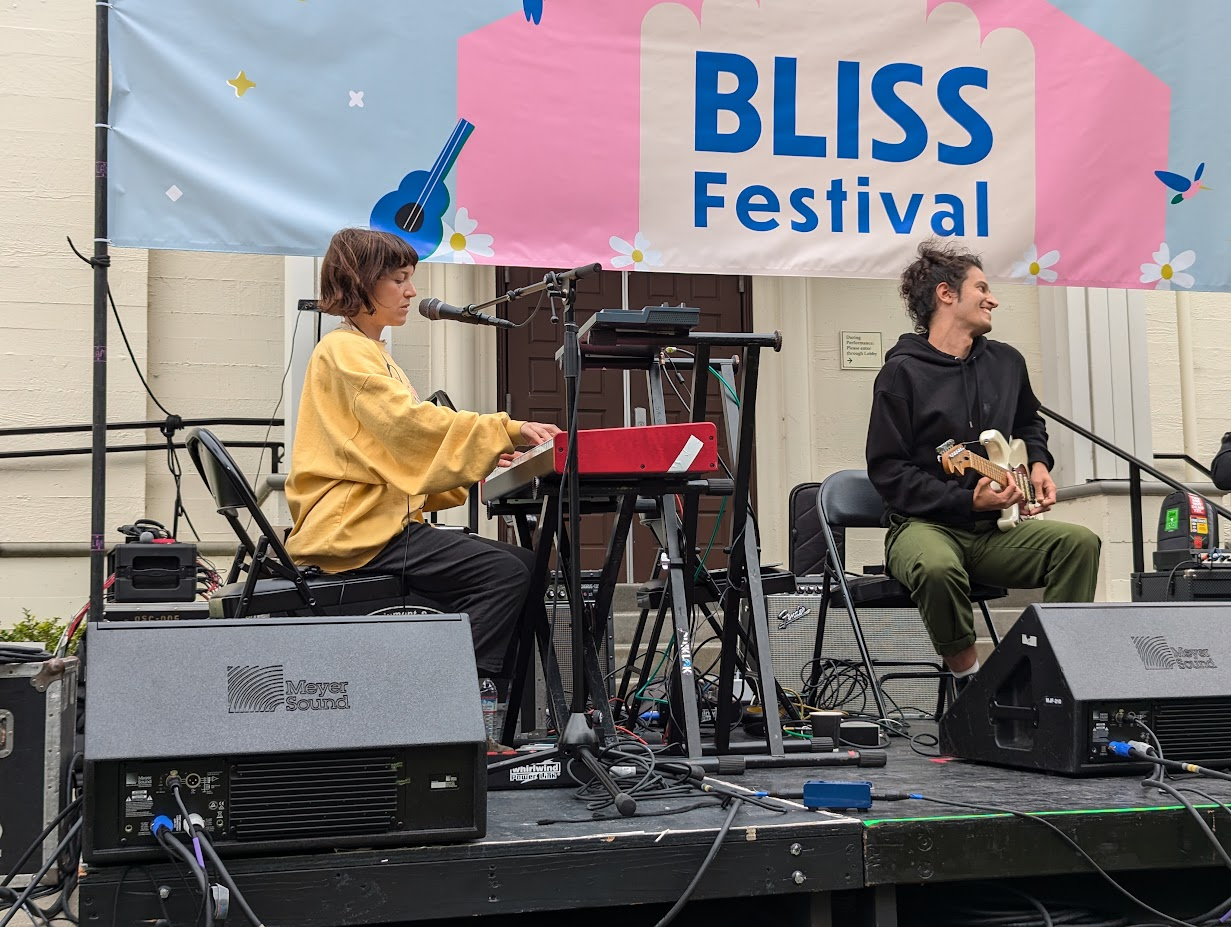
- Lindsay Olsen (left) and Simon Martinez (right) performing at Bliss Festival in the Presidio of San Francisco (2024)

Background information
- Born: Lindsay Olsen
- Origin: San Francisco Bay Area
- Genres: Neo-Psychedelia; Ambient; Bedroom Pop; Indietronica; Experimental music; Nu Jazz
- Occupations: Musician, producer, multi-instrumentalist, singer, songwriter
- Years active: 2014 - present
- Labels: Brainfeeder, Hot Record Societe
- Website: salamirosejoelouismusic.bandcamp.com

Lindsay Olsen, known professionally as Salami Rose Joe Louis, is an American musician, composer, producer, and multi-instrumentalist. As of 2019, Olsen has been signed to the independent record label Brainfeeder, founded by Flying Lotus, and was part of the Oakland-based Smart Bomb multimedia art collective.

== Early life and education ==
Olsen grew up in the San Diego Metropolitan Area. She attended the University of California, Santa Cruz, where she studied earth and planetary science, with a focus in ocean chemistry. Prior to pursuing music full-time, she was a researcher in an oceanography lab in the San Francisco Bay Area

== Career ==
During her time in the Bay Area she became a member of the Oakland-based multimedia art and music collective Smart Bomb. Through this collective, she began collaborating with the independent record label Hot Record Societe. Early albums such as Son of a Sauce! (2016) and Zlaty Sauce Nephew (2017) were released under this label.

In 2019, Olsen signed to Brainfeeder, releasing her label debut, Zdenka 2080 (2019), that same year. This was followed by two more albums with the Brainfeeder label: Chapters of Zdenka in 2020 and Akousmatikous in 2023.

Olsen has toured as a supporting act for artists including Flying Lotus, Toro y Moi, Tune-Yards, and Clairo. In 2022, Olsen was a featured vocalist on Toro y Moi's album Mahal.

In April 2024, Olsen and Simon Martinez, released a collaborative album titled Sarah (2024). In 2025, Olsen released her next solo record, Lorings, through Brainfeeder.

== Musical style and influences ==
Olsen's work has been described as electronica, jazz, and bedroom pop. She cites Stereolab, Shuggie Otis, and R. Stevie Moore as musical influences. She produces and composes her music using a Roland MV-8800.

Her 2019 concept album, Zdenka 2080, was noted by reviewers for its science fiction narrative and avant-garde influences. In a review of the 2024 collaborative album Sarah, WXPN noted the record's hyperpop and drum and bass elements. For her 2025 release, Lorings, Pitchfork described its composition as a mix of lounge music and free jazz.

== Discography ==
=== Studio albums ===
- Son of a Sauce! (2016, Hot Record Societe)
- Zlaty Sauce Nephew (2017, Hot Record Societe)
- Zdenka 2080 (2019, Brainfeeder)
- Chapters of Zdenka (2020, Brainfeeder)
- Akousmatikous (2023, Brainfeeder)
- Sarah (2024, Self-released)
- Lorings (2025, Brainfeeder)

=== EPs ===
- Salami Live at 2131 North Kacey Street (2024, Brainfeeder)

=== Guest appearances ===
- "Magazine" by Toro y Moi from Mahal (2022, Dead Oceans)
- "Zombie pt.2" by Mike from Showbiz! (2025, 10k)
