= What For =

What For may refer to:

- What For? (album), a 2015 album by Toro y Moi
- "What For?" (Aisha song), 2010
- "What For" (James song), 1988
- "What For", song by Rooney from Calling the World
- What For?, a 1975 children's book illustrated by Mick Inkpen
