= Enough of You =

Enough of You may refer to:

- "Enough of You", a song by Nikki Yanofsky on her 2014 album Little Secret
- "Enough of You", a song by Toro y Moi on his 2015 album Samantha
