= Samantha (album) =

Mixtape by Toro y Moi
- Released: August 28, 2015
- Recorded: January 2012 – August 2015; Berkeley, California
- Genres: Hip hop; electronic; ambient; trap
- Length: 51:48
- Producers: Chaz Bundick; Malcolm Peterson; Nosaj Thing

Toro y Moi chronology
What For? (2015)	Samantha (2015)	Boo Boo (2017)

Samantha is a mixtape by American recording artist Toro y Moi, released on August 28, 2015.

== Background ==
Made up of songs recorded by Chaz Bundick between 2012 and 2015, this project differs from previous works. The mixtape was originally released on the artist's Instagram page via a Dropbox link. Moving past previous sounds that revolved around the chillwave genre and heavy synthesizers, Toro y Moi experiments with the sounds of beat machines and hip-hop in this work. Leading up to the full release, B. had released singular tracks like "Pitch Black" and "2Late" via SoundCloud.

The mixtape resembles an album in length, though listens as a collection of songs made individually, some being songs left over from previous projects. Collaborations include artists like fellow chillwave artist Washed Out, Nosaj Thing, and hip-hop artists such as Rome Fortune and Kool A.D. In an interview with the website pigeonsandplanes.com in 2015, B. had this to say about the new project titled Samantha, "I hope to be as popular in the hip-hop world as I am in the indie rock world, or any other music that I like to make. I just try to make good music as much as possible, no matter the genre. If it's good it'll be spread on its own. I never really appreciated when people try to push their music on you. I like it when it's just good and it's there if you want it. That's how I'm approaching the hip-hop world."

"Something I've always done is just make music for me first. What would I like to hear? What kind of drums do I like? What kind of genres do I like? Second of all, see what's already being done, and then go against the grain. Whatever is popular I try to go anti, somehow. Like if things were more atmospheric than I would go opposite, or if things were dry, I would go more atmospheric. It's kinda hard to really say what you do. Just keep changing, make music for yourself, something you enjoy, not what you think other people enjoy."

== Music videos ==
In October 2015, Toro y Moi released the "Dada Art Music Video". This music video includes the tracks "Boo Boo Mobile", "Ambient Rainbow", and "Want" from the Samantha mixtape. The mixtape takes a lo-fi visual approach, showcasing the life of a drug dealer as the video's narrative, with the songs playing over the video's visuals.

== Reception ==
The reception of Toro y Moi's 2015 Samantha was met with mixed reviews. The mixtape however did mainly gain positive reviews, some noted reviews are listed below.

Popmatters.com – Danilo Bortoli – Rating: 5/10.

Prettymuchamazing.com – Austin Reed – Rating: B MINUS.

Greenlabel.com – DJBOOTH – referred to it as the "lowkey album of the year" in 2015.

Pitchfork.com – Eric Torres – Rating: 7.5/10.

== Samples ==
- "Real Love" by Toro y Moi featuring Kool A.D. – sample "All of the Lights" by Kanye West featuring Rihanna and Kid Cudi (2010).
- "Power of Now" by Toro y Moi – sampled "L.S.D. Partie" by Roland Vincent (1969), "You Gets No Love" by Faith Evans (2001), and "The Rill Thing" by Little Richard (1970).
- "Pitch Black" by Toro y Moi and Rome Fortune – sampled "Our Love Use to Be (On the Sunnyside Up)" by The Royal Esquires (1969).
- "Driving Day" by Toro y Moi – sampled "Pain" by Tupac Shakur featuring Stretch (1994).
- "Benjiminz" by Toro y Moi featuring Rome Fortune – sampled "It's All About the Benjamins" by Puff Daddy featuring Lil' Kim, The Lox, and The Notorious B.I.G. (1997).

== Track listing ==
No.	Title	Length
1.	"Power of Now"	2:49
2.	"2 Late" (featuring Kool A.D. and SAFE)	3:08
3.	"Driving Day"	1:48
4.	"Good Song"	1:16
5.	"Pitch Black" (featuring Rome Fortune)	2:53
6.	"Us 2"	1:13
7.	"That Night" (featuring Kool A.D. and SAFE)	3:46
8.	"Stoned at MoMA"	1:18
9.	"Room for 1zone"	2:12
10.	"Want" (featuring Washed Out)	2:46
11.	"ambient Rainbow"	4:17
12.	"Benjiminz" (featuring Rome Fortune)	4:22
13.	"Boo Boo Mobile"	1:52
14.	"bytheneck"	2:40
15.	"Real Love" (featuring Kool A.D.)	2:41
16.	"Enough of You" (featuring Nosaj Thing)	1:35
17.	"The Usual"	2:26
18.	"Prayer Hands"	2:09
19.	"Holy Nights" (featuring SHORE)	4:28
20.	"welp, tour's over"	2:09
Total length:		51:48

== Personnel ==
- Chaz Bundick – design, engineering, layout, mixing, performer, production
- Patrick Jones – mastering
- Jason Chung – production
- Malcolm Peterson – production
