= Fresh Moss =

American rapper

- Also known as: Skinny Fresco
- Born: Tysheef Moss; October 3, 1989 (age 36)
- Origin: Newark, New Jersey
- Genres: Hip-Hop
- Occupations: Rapper, Singer, songwriter, Producer, actor, TV Producer
- Years active: 2010–present
- Label: Crystal Roots Media LLC
- Website: freshmoss.com

Tysheef Moss (born October 3, 1989), better known by his stage name Fresh Moss, is an American rapper from Newark, New Jersey. He is an independent artist and member of the hip-hop collective LVLYSL INC. He is best known for the Skinny Fresco mixtape series. On March 26, 2015 he released his sixth mixtape Skinny Fresco Vol. 3.

== Life and career ==
Growing up Fresh Moss lived in Newark, New Jersey. His debut mixtape New Jersey Drive hosted by DJ Spin King was released April 25, 2010 via datpiff.com. Later that year he followed up with his second mixtape The Intervention November 28, 2010. In 2011 Moss joined the Hip-Hop collective LVLYSL INC. and in 2012 was featured on Neako's debut album These Are The Times. On August 28, 2013, Moss released an EP titled The Martyr with all original production in preparation for his first full length mixtape Skinny Fresco. The EP featured Neako and Bonnie Blunts.

On March 24, 2014 he released his fourth mixtape Skinny Fresco along with his own apparel. The project featured production from Neako, Champion and Yung Citizen. Three months following the release of Skinny Fresco, Moss announced Skinny Fresco Volume 2. September 17, 2014 Fresh released the first single from his project Always and spoke to The Source Magazine about growing up in Newark, New Jersey. October 16, 2014 Moss was featured in New Jersey's Star Ledger. On October 24, 2014 Skinny Fresco Vol. 2, was released featuring Father, and Neako with production from 2DZ, Lex Luger, PurpDogg, and more. December 1, 2014 he re-released both Skinny Fresco and Skinny Fresco Vol. 2 via iTunes.

January 5, 2015 he announced the last and final installment in his Skinny Fresco series, Volume 3. He was named one of the thirty-five artist from New Jersey to look for in 2015. February 16, 2015 Fresh released his first single from Volume 3, Deuce Biggalo on iTunes. His second single October 3rd, was released March 2, 2015. On March 23, 2015 Pigeons and Planes premiered Understand featuring Rome Fortune. Following the release of Understand on March 26, 2015 Moss released his latest project Skinny Fresco Vol. 3 featuring Neako and Rome Fortune with production from Lex Luger, PurpDogg, 2DZ, and Champion.

== Discography ==
=== Albums ===
- Fresh Moss (2017)

=== EPs ===
- The Martyr (2013)
- Mirage Island (2015)
- VVS (2017)

=== Mixtapes ===
- New Jersey Drive (2010)
- The Intervention (2010)
- Skinny Fresco (2014)
- Skinny Fresco Vol. 2 (2014)
- Skinny Fresco Vol. 3 (2015)
