= Fated =

Fated may refer to:

- Fate
- Fated (album), a 2015 album by Nosaj Thing
- "Glitter"/"Fated", a 2007 song by Japanese pop singer Ayumi Hamasaki
- Fated, a 2006 film set in Liverpool with Michael Angelis, Katrine De Candole, Craig Charles and Lee Boardman
- Fated, a 2010 novel by S. G. Browne
- Fated, the first book in Benedict Jacka's Alex Verus series
