= Eric André Live Near Broadway =

- The Eric Andre Show episode
- Directed by: Lance Bangs
- Presented by: Eric Andre
- Original release date: January 18, 2024

Guest appearances
- Billy Porter and Juelz Santana

Eric André Live Near Broadway is a live comedy special based on The Eric André Show, released on January 18, 2024, and broadcast on Adult Swim. It was directed by Lance Bangs and stars comedian Eric André.

== Production ==
Following a hiatus after the fifth season, the special was announced in 2024. It was filmed at Terminal 5 in New York City and features the same style of humor as the original series including the audience interaction, and guest appearances by Billy Porter and Juelz Santana.

== Reception ==
The special received mixed reviews, with some considering it weak in comparison to the original show.
