= Perfect Shapes =

Studio album by Madeline Kenney
- Released: October 5, 2018
- Recorded: January 2018
- Genres: Indie rock; experimental rock; art rock
- Length: 37:34

Madeline Kenney chronology
Night Night at the First Landing (2017)	Perfect Shapes (2018)	Sucker's Lunch (2020)

Singles from Perfect Shapes
- 1. "Cut Me Off" Released: July 12, 2018; 2. "Bad Idea" Released: September 14, 2018

Professional ratings
Aggregate scores
Source	Rating
AnyDecentMusic?	7.3/10
Metacritic	76/100
Review scores
Source	Rating
The 405	7.5/10
AllMusic	3.5/5 stars
Drowned in Sound	8/10
God Is in the TV	9/10
Paste	7.5/10
Pitchfork	7.2/10

Perfect Shapes is the second studio album by American indie rock musician Madeline Kenney. It was released on October 5, 2018 under Carpark Records.

== Production ==
The album was recorded in January 2018 in Durham, North Carolina, alongside producer Jenn Wasner.

== Critical reception ==
Perfect Shapes was met with "generally favorable" reviews from critics. At Metacritic, which assigns a weighted average rating out of 100 to reviews from mainstream publications, this release received an average score of 76, based on 8 reviews. Aggregator Album of the Year gave the release a 77 out of 100 based on a critical consensus of 9 reviews.

Joe Goggins of Drowned in Sound admired Kenney's vocals saying that unlike her previous album, it stood out "front and centre, ringing out honeyed and clear as a bell with only minimal effects applied", and noted the album is "so sharply made in Kenney's own non-conformist image, and she gets away with it. On this form, she's destined for alt-pop greatness."

=== Accolades ===
Accolades for Perfect Shapes
Publication	Accolade	Rank
God Is in the TV	God Is in the TV's Top 50 Albums of 2018	84
Under the Radar	Under the Radar's Top 100 Albums of 2018	73

== Track listing ==
Perfect Shapes track listing
No.	Title	Length
1.	"Overhead"	3:57
2.	"Bad Idea"	4:05
3.	"Cut Me Off"	3:19
4.	"No Weekend"	2:59
5.	"Know"	4:23
6.	"The Flavor of the Fruit Tree"	3:29
7.	"I Went Home"	3:38
8.	"Perfect Shapes"	4:35
9.	"Your Art"	3:27
10.	"Always Around Me"	3:42

== Personnel ==
Musicians

- Madeline Kenney – primary artist, guitar
- Camille Lewis – drums
- Stephen Patota – guitar
- Derek Barber – guitar

Production

- Ben Sloan – producer
- Jenn Wasner – producer
