= Blessa =

2009 single by Toro y Moi

- Cover of Blessa b/w 109

Single by Toro y Moi

from the album Causers of This
- B-side: "109"
- Released: May 10, 2009
- Genre: Chillwave
- Length: 2:23 (single); 2:43 (album)
- Label: Carpark
- Songwriter: Chaz Bear

Toro y Moi singles chronology
| "Left Alone at Night" (2009) | "Blessa" (2009) | "Leave Everywhere" (2010) |

"Blessa" is a song by American singer Toro y Moi. The song originally released October 5, 2009, on the EP Blessa b/w 109, which featured "Blessa," as well as a B-side titled "109." A slightly modified version of "Blessa" appeared on Toro y Moi's first album, Causers of This, as the first track.

== Critical reception ==
"Blessa" received positive reviews from critics. The Guardian described the track as "hazy summer sounds with a New Jack shine, as if Jimmy Jam and Terry Lewis produced the Cocteau Twins," with Pitchfork describing "Blessa" as "just like one of [Toro y Moi's] spontaneously snapped photos of a hazy afternoon that quickly captures a sentiment and bottles it, culminating yet another piece of Toro Y [sic] Moi's life collage."

== Music video ==
In January 2010, a music video for "Blessa" released. The video featured directing, cinematography, and editing by Jon Casey.
