= A Girl Like Me =

A Girl Like Me or Girl Like Me may refer to:

== Film and television ==
- A Girl like Me (film), a 2005 American documentary short film by Kiri Davis
- A Girl Like Me: The Gwen Araujo Story, a 2006 American television film

== Music ==
=== Albums ===
- A Girl Like Me (Emma Bunton album) or the title song, 2001
- A Girl Like Me (Rihanna album) or the title song, 2006
- A Girl Like Me: Letters to My Lovers, an EP by Peppermint, or the title song, 2020
- A Girl like Me, by Nikkole, 2005

=== Songs ===
- "Girl Like Me" (Black Eyed Peas and Shakira song), 2020
- "Girl Like Me" (Dove Cameron song), 2022
- "Girl like Me" (Jazmine Sullivan song), 2021
- "Girl Like Me" (Luv' song), 1990
- "Girl Like Me", by Jessie James Decker from Southern Girl City Lights, 2017
- "Girl Like Me" (PinkPantheress song), 2025
- "A Girl Like Me", by Christina Milian from Christina Milian, 2001
- "A Girl Like Me", by The Desert Sessions from Volume 10: I Heart Disco, 2003

== See also ==
- A Girl Like You (disambiguation)
