= Blarf =

American band

BLARF
- Origin: Boston, Massachusetts (band); Los Angeles, California (solo)
- Years active: Early 2000s (band); 2014, 2019, 2026–present (solo)
- Label: Stones Throw
- Members: Eric André
- Website: blarf.bandcamp.com

Blarf (stylized in all caps) is a multi-genre musical project created by Eric André. Blarf was originally a band consisting of André and other unnamed bandmates, but it quickly disbanded. In 2019, André revived the name of the band as a solo act, yet still acting as a band, and has released the albums Cease & Desist and Film Scores for Films That Don't Exist on Stones Throw Records.

== History ==
After Eric André enrolled at the Berklee School of Music in Boston, Massachusetts, he formed the band Blarf with the goal of mimicking the styles of Frank Zappa and Beastie Boys. The band was, however, short-lived due to the band's drummer getting "married at 18 to an extremely pro-life woman"; the band had made a song called "I Love Abortions".

On December 25, 2014, André independently released a collaborative EP with Canadian record producer the First Seed, titled BLARF.

On June 6, 2019, it was announced that Blarf, a new artist signed to Stones Throw Records, would be releasing his debut studio album Cease & Desist on June 26. Blarf was soon rumored to be an alias of André, who denied it at the time, writing on Twitter, "People are confusing this guy BLARF on @stonesthrow for me!"

The lead single to the album, "Badass Bullshit Benjamin Buttons Butthole Assassin", was released on June 18 with an accompanying music video. Cease & Desist was then released as scheduled on June 26, 2019, through Stones Throw. The album is heavily sample-based and contains elements of plunderphonics and noise music. Music videos for tracks "Banana" and "Boom Ba" were released on July 31 and August 12, 2019, respectively.

André performed live as Blarf for the first time on July 6, 2019, in Los Angeles with fellow experimental musicians Thundercat, DOMi and JD Beck. For his rare public appearances, he is seen wearing a Ronald McDonald costume as seen on the Cease & Desist cover art.

== Discography ==
=== Blarf ===
BLARF

EP by Eric André and The First Seed
- Released: December 25, 2014
- Genres: Alternative hip hop; industrial hip hop; electronic
- Length: 6:20
- Label: Self-released
- Producer: The First Seed

Blarf (stylized in all caps) is a collaborative EP by American comedian Eric André and Canadian electronic musician The First Seed. It was uploaded to The First Seed's Bandcamp on December 25, 2014.

Track listing

- All tracks written by Eric André and produced by The First Seed.

No.	Title	Length
1.	"iSteal"	1:01
2.	"Who I Am"	1:14
3.	"Wickedpedia"	1:39
4.	"Beef Patty"	2:23
Total length:		6:20

=== Cease & Desist ===
Cease & Desist

Studio album by Blarf
- Released: June 26, 2019
- Genres: Plunderphonics; experimental; avant-garde jazz; alternative hip hop; noise; glitch
- Length: 27:48
- Label: Stones Throw Records
- Producer: BLARF

Cease & Desist is the debut studio album by Blarf, the experimental musician alter-ego of American comedian Eric André. It was released on June 26, 2019, by Stones Throw Records.

Track listing

- All tracks written and produced by Eric André as Blarf.

No.	Title	Length
1.	"Badass Bullshit Benjamin Buttons Butthole Assassin"	3:57
2.	"Save It Babe"	1:41
3.	"Banana"	2:48
4.	"Like That"	0:32
5.	"I Dunno"	0:36
6.	"Hella Rhymes"	1:00
7.	"I Worship Satan"	12:39
8.	"Boom Ba"	3:05
9.	"The Me in Me"	1:35
Total length:		27:48

=== Film Scores for Films That Don't Exist ===
Film Scores for Films That Don't Exist

Studio album by Blarf
- Released: May 1, 2026
- Genres: Classical; experimental; electronic; ambient; avant-garde metal
- Length: 31:07
- Label: Stones Throw Records
- Producers: BLARF; Prateek Rajagopal

Film Scores for Films That Don't Exist is the second studio album by Blarf. It released on May 1, 2026, by Stones Throw Records.

Track listing

- All tracks written and produced by Eric André as Blarf and Prateek Rajagopal.

No.	Title	Length
1.	"The Final Shootout"	1:39
2.	"What's for Dinner"	3:52
3.	"Stars Without Light"	4:22
4.	"Piano Concerto No. 0"	4:00
5.	"Mercury Dripping Down My Spine"	7:47
6.	"Run for Your Death"	2:23
7.	"Dead Ballerina"	6:00
8.	"1869 Overture"	1:04
Total length:		31:07
