= Underneath the Pine =

Studio album by Toro y Moi
- Released: February 22, 2011
- Recorded: February–June 2010
- Genre: Neo-psychedelia; chillwave; synth-pop; indie pop; funk
- Length: 39:01
- Label: Carpark
- Producer: Chazwick Bundick

Toro y Moi chronology
Causers of This (2010)	Underneath the Pine (2011)	June 2009 (2012)

Singles from Underneath the Pine
- 1. "Still Sound" Released: December 13, 2010; 2. "New Beat" Released: January 31, 2011; 3. "How I Know"

Professional ratings
Aggregate scores
Source	Rating
Metacritic	79/100
Review scores
Source	Rating
AllMusic	4/5 stars
Pitchfork	8.3/10
NME	7/10
Drowned in Sound	7/10

Underneath the Pine is the second album from the artist Toro y Moi, released on February 22, 2011 on Carpark Records. The album was given the "Best New Music" designation by Pitchfork and they placed the album at number 48 on its list of the "Top 50 albums of 2011".

The Korean edition of the album features the bonus track "Ricardo and Ryne."

== Track listing ==
No.	Title	Length
1.	"Intro / Chi Chi"	2:25
2.	"New Beat"	4:05
3.	"Go With You"	3:58
4.	"Divina"	2:19
5.	"Before I'm Done"	2:42
6.	"Got Blinded"	3:10
7.	"How I Know"	4:05
8.	"Light Black"	3:23
9.	"Still Sound"	4:30
10.	"Good Hold"	2:27
11.	"Elise"	6:01

Korean edition
No.	Title	Length
12.	"Ricardo and Ryne"	4:46
