= Themes for Dying Earth =

Studio album by Teen Daze
- Released: February 10, 2017
- Length: 41:24
- Label: Flora

Teen Daze chronology
Morning World (2015)	Themes for Dying Earth (2017)	Themes for a New Earth (2017)

Themes for Dying Earth is the sixth studio album by Canadian musician Teen Daze. It was released in February 2017 under Flora Records.

Professional ratings
Aggregate scores
Source	Rating
Metacritic	76/100
Review scores
Source	Rating
The Line of Best Fit	8/10
Exclaim!	8/10
AllMusic	3.5/5 stars

== Track listing ==
No.	Title	Length
1.	"Cycle"	4:08
2.	"Dream City"	4:45
3.	"Becoming"	1:25
4.	"Lost"	4:39
5.	"Cherry Blossoms"	5:21
6.	"First Rain"	3:57
7.	"Rising"	4:58
8.	"Anew"	2:43
9.	"Water in Heaven"	6:13
10.	"Breath"	3:15
