= Girls Like You (disambiguation) =

"Girls Like You" is a 2018 song by Maroon 5.

Girls Like You may also refer to:

- "Girls Like You", a song by Miguel from the album All I Want Is You, 2010
- "Girls Like You", a song by the Naked and Famous from the album Passive Me, Aggressive You, 2010

== See also ==
- A Girl Like You (disambiguation)
