= Continua (Nosaj Thing album) =

Studio album by Nosaj Thing
- Released: October 28, 2022
- Genre: Electronic
- Length: 40:24
- Label: LuckyMe; Timetable
- Producer: Nosaj Thing; Sunny Levine

Nosaj Thing chronology
No Mind (2020)	Continua (2022)

Continua is the fifth studio album by American electronic musician Nosaj Thing. It was released on October 28, 2022.

== Track listing ==
No.	Title	Length
1.	"Continua" (featuring Duval Timothy)	3:09
2.	"My Soul or Something" (featuring Kazu Makino)	3:53
3.	"Process"	3:02
4.	"Woodland" (featuring serpentwithfeet)	4:04
5.	"Blue Hour" (featuring Julianna Barwick)	3:31
6.	"Grasp" (featuring Coby Sey, Slauson Malone and Sam Gendel)	2:37
7.	"We Are (우리는)" (featuring HYUKOH)	3:46
8.	"Condition" (featuring Toro Y Moi)	3:44
9.	"Look Both Ways" (featuring Pink Siifu)	2:58
10.	"All Over" (featuring Panda Bear)	2:59
11.	"Skyline"	3:13
12.	"Different Life" (featuring Eyedress)	3:24
