= Hole Erth =

2024 album by Toro y Moi

Studio album by Toro y Moi
- Released: September 6, 2024
- Genres: Emo rap; indie rock; pop-punk; pop
- Length: 41:15
- Label: Dead Oceans

Toro y Moi chronology
Mahal (2022)	Hole Erth (2024)

Hole Erth is the eighth studio album by American musician Chaz Bear under the name Toro y Moi. The album released on September 6, 2024, under the label Dead Oceans. The name of the album is an homage to Stewart Brand's periodical, Whole Earth.

== Background ==
After drawing on his adolescent folk and singer-songwriter influences for the Sandhills EP he released in 2023, Bear continued to draw on his early influences for Hole Erth, this time from the pop-punk scene of the 90's, referencing the work of artists like Green Day and Blink-182. As a west-coast resident, the influences of the Bay Area and California in general provided another reference point, including for the name of the album, playing on the title of the 60's periodical Whole Earth, which he found while exploring books on self-sufficiency published from the '60s counterculture. Merging the identities he held as a teenager in South Carolina and a new father in his thirties in California served as a theme for the writing and sonic direction of the album.

== Critical reception ==
According to the review aggregator Metacritic, Hole Erth received "generally favorable reviews" based on a weighted average score of 76 out of 100 from 6 critic scores. The lowest review from a major reviewing publication that Hole Erth received was a 5.7/10 from Pitchfork, with the review stating the album sounds like "an imitation" of emo rap and artists like 24kGoldn. Clash Magazine praised the album's bold mixing of genres and willingness to "completely lean into these new found sounds, with the clarity and expertise that has been heard throughout [Bear's] discography thus far". Writing for Paste, Alex Gonzales called the album "[Bear's] strongest as a concept", and stated "the 13 songs flow smoothly throughout the close-knit package", praising "Heaven" as a strong climax for the record.

Professional ratings
Aggregate scores
Source	Rating
Metacritic	76/100
Review scores
Source	Rating
Pitchfork	5.7/10
theneedledrop	6/10
Allmusic	4/5 stars
Clash	8/10
Paste Magazine	7.9/10

== Track listing ==
All tracks are written by Chaz Bear.

Hole Erth track listing
No.	Title	Featured artist(s)	Length
1.	"Walking in the Rain"		3:34
2.	"CD-R"		2:36
3.	"HOV"		3:48
4.	"Tuesday"		2:29
5.	"Hollywood"	Benjamin Gibbard	3:05
6.	"Reseda"	Duckwrth and Elijah Kessler	2:32
7.	"Babydaddy"		3:12
8.	"Madonna"	Don Toliver	2:52
9.	"Undercurrent"	Don Toliver and Porches	3:22
10.	"Off Road"		3:12
11.	"Smoke"	Kenny Mason	3:38
12.	"Heaven"	Kevin Abstract and Lev	3:54
13.	"Starlink"	Glaive	3:01
Total length:			41:15

Japanese edition bonus track
No.	Title	Featured artist(s)	Length
14.	"Daria"	Kenny Beats	2:32
Total length:			43.47

== Unerthed: Hole Erth Unplugged ==
On September 19, 2025, Bear released an acoustic, "unplugged" version of Hole Erth (referred to as "unerthed" versions), featuring the original 13 tracks of Hole Erth.
