= Home (Nosaj Thing album) =

Studio album by Nosaj Thing
- Released: January 22, 2013
- Genres: Electronic; instrumental hip-hop
- Length: 36:35
- Labels: Innovative Leisure; Timetable
- Producer: Nosaj Thing

Nosaj Thing chronology
Drift (2009)	Home (2013)	Fated (2015)

Singles from Home
- 1. "Eclipse/Blue" Released: 2012

Professional ratings
Aggregate scores
Source	Rating
Metacritic	72/100
Review scores
Source	Rating
AllMusic	3.5/5 stars
BBC	favorable
Beats Per Minute	85/100
MusicOMH	4/5 stars
Pitchfork	7.8/10
PopMatters	6/10 stars
Slant Magazine	2/5 stars
XLR8R	7/10

Home is the second studio album by American electronic musician Nosaj Thing. It was released on January 22, 2013.

== Critical reception ==
At Metacritic, which assigns a weighted average score out of 100 to reviews from mainstream critics, Home received an average score of 72% based on 15 reviews, indicating "generally favorable reviews".

== Track listing ==
No.	Title	Length
1.	"Home"	2:39
2.	"Eclipse/Blue" (featuring Kazu Makino)	4:29
3.	"Safe"	3:48
4.	"Glue"	4:18
5.	"Distance"	3:16
6.	"Tell"	2:50
7.	"Snap"	3:26
8.	"Prelude"	1:41
9.	"Try" (featuring Toro y Moi)	4:02
10.	"Phase III"	3:23
11.	"Light 3"	2:43

Japanese edition bonus track
No.	Title	Length
12.	"5555"	3:23

== Charts ==
Chart	Peak position
US Top Dance/Electronic Albums (Billboard)	11
US Heatseekers Albums (Billboard)	9
US Independent Albums (Billboard)	46
