= Night Night at the First Landing =

Studio album by Madeline Kenney
- Released: September 1, 2017
- Genre: Indie rock
- Length: 32:48
- Label: Company
- Producer: Chaz Bear

Madeline Kenney chronology
Signals (2016)	Night Night at the First Landing (2017)	Perfect Shapes (2018)

Night Night at the First Landing is the debut studio album by American singer-songwriter Madeline Kenney. It was released on September 1, 2017, via Company Records.

== Background ==
The album was written by Kenney and was produced by Chaz Bear, who is also known as Toro y Moi. The songs in the album were described as "seeming to focus more on moody thoughtfulness than a specific message." PopMatters rated the album with 8 out of 10 and described it as a reliably satisfying listen.

Kenney was initially unfamiliar with the musical style of Bear, who asked her if he could produce the album. She said "Chaz came to one of our shows and afterwards he came up to me and was like, 'That was really great. I want to record you' and I was like, 'Okay!' and 'Oh, whatever!'".

Professional ratings
Review scores
Source	Rating
PopMatters	8/10

== Track listing ==
No.	Title	Length
1.	"Don't Forget / There's Room"	3:24
2.	"Rita"	2:54
3.	"Witching Hour"	3:04
4.	"John in Irish"	4:44
5.	"This Way / You're Happy"	2:02
6.	"Always"	3:30
7.	"Big One"	2:58
8.	"Waitless"	3:09
9.	"Uncommon"	3:22
10.	"Give Up / On Anything"	3:41
Total length:		32:48
