= Girl Like You (Toro y Moi song) =

Single by Toro y Moi

from the album Boo Boo
- Released: June 9, 2017
- Recorded: 2016
- Genre: Synth-pop; R&B
- Length: 3:43
- Label: Carpark
- Songwriter: Chaz Bundick
- Producer: Chaz Bundick

Toro y Moi singles chronology
"Grown Up Calls (Live)" (2016)	"Girl Like You" (2017)	"You and I" (2017)

"Girl Like You" is a song recorded by American singer-songwriter Toro y Moi. The song was released on June 9, 2017 through Carpark Records, as the lead single from his fifth studio album Boo Boo (2017). Toro y Moi is the recording project of musician Chaz Bundick, who wrote, produced, engineered, mixed, and performed all instrumentation on the track.

== Background ==
The sound that opens the song was a simply a preset on a synthesizer that Bundick left in because he considered it "so beautiful."

== Reception ==
The song was first released on June 9, 2017, accompanying the announcement of Bundick's fifth album, Boo Boo. It also premiered with its official music video. Writer Randall Colburn called it a "suitably psychedelic video that [...] placed [Bundick] front and center, with the artist making direct eye contact with the camera." Michelle Geslani at Consequence of Sound considered it Bundick's "most playful" single in some time, writing, "It's backloaded with grooving bongo rhythms and squinching synths giving the chorus and electronic slickness."
