= This Is What Heartbreak Feels Like =

Single by Jvke

from the album This Is What ____ Feels Like (Vol. 1–4)
- Released: February 28, 2023
- Genre: Indie-pop
- Length: 2:37
- Label: AWAL
- Songwriters: Jacob Lawson; Aidan Peterson; Zac Lawson
- Producers: Jvke; Instupendo; Zvc

Jvke singles chronology
"Hero" (2022)	"This Is What Heartbreak Feels Like" (2023)	"This Is What Losing Someone Feels Like" (2023)

Remix cover

Music video
- "This Is What Heartbreak Feels Like" on YouTube

"This Is What Heartbreak Feels Like" (stylized in all lowercase) is a song by American singer Jvke. The song was originally released as a promotional single on March 31, 2022 before impacting US contemporary hit radio on February 28, 2023 as an official single. The song was certified platinum by the RIAA on February 28, 2025. The song peaked at number 66 on the UK Video Streaming Chart for 13 weeks, (Note: Technically 14 weeks counting position 96.) a week later, going down to position 96. It is a pop song that includes lyrics about romantic themes. A remix featuring CG5 was released on April 25, 2025.

== Virality and commercial performance ==
"This Is What Heartbreak Feels Like" first went viral on TikTok starting in 2023, following the release of "This Is What Love Feels Like".

== Charts ==
Chart performance for "This Is What Heartbreak Feels Like"
Chart (2024)	Peak position
UK Video Streaming Chart (OCC)	66

== Certifications ==
Certifications for "This Is What Heartbreak Feels Like"
Region	Certification	Certified units/sales
United Kingdom (BPI)	Silver	200,000^{‡}
United States (RIAA)	Platinum	1,000,000^{‡}
^{‡} Sales+streaming figures based on certification alone.
