= Freelance (song) =

2018 single by Toro y Moi

Single by Toro y Moi

from the album Outer Peace
- Released: October 23, 2018
- Length: 3:45
- Label: Carpark
- Songwriter(s): Chaz Bear
- Producer(s): Chaz Bear

Toro y Moi singles chronology
"Omaha" (2018)	"Freelance" (2018)	"Ordinary Pleasure" (2018)

"Freelance" is a 2018 song recorded by American singer-songwriter Chaz Bear under the stage name Toro y Moi. The song was released on October 23, 2018, under Carpark Records. The song was the lead single of Toro y Moi's sixth studio album, Outer Peace. The song was recorded in the San Francisco Bay Area and was inspired by Bear's time spent living in Portland, Oregon.

In a press release, Bear stated that "Freelance" is "a response to how disposable culture has become and how it affects creativity".

== Critical response ==
Pitchfork, reviewing the track and the meaning of its lyrics, said that "disillusionment has never sounded so danceable". Wired said that "Freelance" is "built like a disco software stack", later clarifying that the statement is "a very good thing". Vice complimented the track, stating that the track gave a "very late-90s, post-disco revival" vibe; Vice later interviewed Bear about the single.

== Music video ==
The music video for "Freelance" features Bear sitting on a yoga ball, as well as a pink-orange gradient background, both of which are featured on the album cover of Outer Peace.

== Lyrics ==
Some of the lyrics in "Freelance" were taken from "Hotcha Girls", a 2002 song by Ugly Casanova.

In the chorus of "Freelance", Bear interpolates part of "Leaf House", a song by Animal Collective.
