= Drift (Nosaj Thing album) =

Studio album by Nosaj Thing
- Released: June 9, 2009
- Recorded: 2006–2009
- Studios: Los Angeles, California
- Genres: Electronic; instrumental hip-hop
- Length: 36:52
- Label: Alpha Pup
- Producer: Nosaj Thing

Nosaj Thing chronology
Drift (2009)	Home (2013)

Professional ratings
Aggregate scores
Source	Rating
Metacritic	83/100
Review scores
Source	Rating
AllMusic	4/5 stars
Pitchfork	7.9/10
PopMatters	8/10
RapReviews	8.5/10
Spin	4/5 stars
Tiny Mix Tapes	3.5/5 stars
Tom Hull	B+
URB	4/5 stars
XLR8R	8/10

Drift is the first studio album by American electronic musician Nosaj Thing. It was released on June 9, 2009. A remix of the album, titled Drift (Remixed), was released on November 2, 2010.

== Critical reception ==
At Metacritic, which assigns a weighted average score out of 100 to reviews from mainstream critics, Drift received an average score of 83 based on 7 reviews, indicating "universal acclaim".

Mosi Reeves of Spin said, "Nosaj's remarkable, entrancing debut album gathers sundry influences, from U.K. dubstep to Aphex Twin-styled IDM, into a 36-minute computerized symphony." Shawn Reynaldo of XLR8R gave the album an 8 out of 10, saying: "Settling somewhere between Flying Lotus' otherworldly jazz and The Glitch Mob's crunked-up floor-fillers, Drift is an impeccably produced record that sounds amazing in headphones but also has enough bump to hit the dancefloor every now and then."

== Track listing ==
No.	Title	Length
1.	"Quest"	1:36
2.	"Fog"	3:42
3.	"Coat of Arms"	3:28
4.	"IOIO"	3:25
5.	"1685/Bach"	2:48
6.	"Caves"	3:48
7.	"Light #1"	2:56
8.	"Light #2"	3:11
9.	"2222"	1:59
10.	"Us"	3:07
11.	"Voices"	3:21
12.	"Lords"	3:27

Japanese edition bonus track
No.	Title	Length
13.	"Harrison Ford"	3:01
