= Tanukichan =

San Francisco based singer-songwriter

- Born: Hannah Junghwa van Loon; 1986 or 1987 (age 38–39); San Francisco, California, U.S.
- Genres: Alternative rock; indie rock; dream pop; shoegaze
- Occupation(s): Singer-songwriter, musician
- Years active: 2016–present
- Labels: Company Records
- Website: https://www.tanukichan.com/

Hannah Junghwa van Loon (born 1986 or 1987), known professionally as Tanukichan, is an American singer-songwriter based in San Francisco.

Her debut album Sundays was released on July 13, 2018 via Company Records with production by Chaz Bear of Toro y Moi. Following the release of Sundays, van Loon supported the musical act Kero Kero Bonito on their 2018 tour. Prior to Sundays, van Loon independently released her EP Radiolove and an early version of the song “Bitter Medicine” in 2016. On March 3, 2023, van Loon released her second album GIZMO on Company Records, also produced by Chaz Bear. In June and July 2023, she was the supporting act for Melanie Martinez on all 29 stops of her North American PORTALS Tour. Van Loon was the special guest for Alex G and Alvvays' co-headline 2023 Summer Tour that took place in August.

== Early life ==
Van Loon was raised in the San Francisco Bay Area in a Christian family. She grew up performing classical music, studying keyboard, violin, guitar, and bass. Van Loon first began playing in ensembles as a fiddle player in a bluegrass band. During this time she was enrolled at University of California, Berkeley, majoring in mathematics. She later spent four years in San Francisco pop band Trails and Ways.

Van Loon's stage name refers to the addition of the Japanese honorific chan to the name of the tanuki, an animal which has significance in much of Japanese folklore. While growing up, van Loon was often referred to as "Hannah-chan".

== Discography ==
=== Studio albums ===
List of studio albums
| Title | Album details |
|---|---|
| Sundays | Released: July 13, 2018; Label: Company Records; Formats: LP, CD |
| GIZMO | Released: March 3, 2023; Label: Company Records; Formats: LP, CD |

=== Singles ===
List of singles showing year released and album name
| Title | Year | Album |
|---|---|---|
| "Bitter Medicine"^{1} | 2016 | Sundays |
| "So Gone / Loop" | 2019 | — |
| "Make Believe" | 2022 | Gizmo |
| "Thin Air" (featuring Enumclaw) | 2023 | Gizmo |
| "Take Care" | 2023 | Gizmo |
| "NPC" | 2023 | — |
| "City Bus" | 2024 | — |
| "It Gets Easier" | 2024 | — |

=== Extended plays ===
List of extended plays
| Title | EP details |
|---|---|
| Radiolove | Released: 2016; Label: Carpark Records; Formats: CS, digital download |
| Circles | Released: 2024; Label: Carpark Records; Formats: Digital download |

=== Soundtracks ===
List of non-single guest appearances, showing year released and album name
| Title | Year | Album |
|---|---|---|
| "To What End" | 2025 | Professional Void |
| "Hide-A-Lullaby" | 2025 | Adult Romantix |
| "Little Star" | 2025 | Goodnight Universe soundtrack |

== Notes ==
1. The instrumentation and mixing on the single release of "Bitter Medicine" is significantly different from the version that later appears on Sundays. Despite this, there is no formal acknowledgement that this version is a demo.
