= Ordinary Pleasure =

Single by Toro y Moi

from the album Outer Peace
- Released: December 4, 2018
- Recorded: 2018
- Genre: Synth-pop; disco
- Length: 3:03
- Label: Carpark
- Songwriter: Chaz Bundick
- Producer: Chaz Bundick

Toro y Moi singles chronology
"Freelance" (2018)	"Ordinary Pleasure" (2018)	"Dark and Handsome" (2019)

"Ordinary Pleasure" is a song recorded by American singer-songwriter Toro y Moi. The song was released on December 4, 2018, by Carpark Records, as the second single from his sixth studio album Outer Peace (2019). Toro y Moi is the recording project of musician Chaz Bundick, who wrote, produced, engineered, mixed, and performed all instrumentation on the track.

== Background ==
The song's music video, directed by Mancy Gant, depicts Bundick and his band performing and hosting a dance party with artists from his Company Record Label studio, based in Oakland, California.

== Reception ==
Ben Kaye at Consequence of Sound considered it Bundick's "most playful" single in some time, writing, "It's backloaded with grooving bongo rhythms and squinching synths giving the chorus and electronic slickness." Gabriela Tully Claymore, writing for Stereogum, perceived a "quiet desperation to the lyrics" of the tune, "made quieter by the fact that the instrumentation is so languid and easy-going."

== Charts ==
Chart performance for "Ordinary Pleasure"
Chart (2019)	Peak position
Belgium (Ultratop Bubbling Under Flanders)	— (Note: "Ordinary Pleasure" did not enter the Ultratop 50, but was listed on the Ultratip Bubbling Under chart, which acts as an extension to the Ultratop 50.)
