= Outer Peace =

Studio album by Toro y Moi
- Released: January 18, 2019
- Genre: Synth-pop
- Length: 30:30
- Label: Carpark
- Producer: Chaz Bear

Toro y Moi chronology
Boo Boo (2017)	Outer Peace (2019)	Soul Trash (2019)

Outer Peace is the sixth studio album by American musician Toro y Moi, released on January 18, 2019, through Carpark Records. The tracks "Freelance" and "Ordinary Pleasure" were released prior to the album. On January 10, the album became available to stream in full via NPR's website.

== Background ==
Chaz Bear stated that the album came about after he decided not to tour for his previous record, 2017's Boo Boo. He instead played DJ sets, later explaining that "The [club] nightlife energy is way different than the concert type of nightlife energy. This next album for Toro is a lot more inspired by bigger club sounds." Along with the "accessible dance music" of Daft Punk, Bear was inspired by Wally Badarou's "innovative synths" and trips to Mexico City and Northern California while making the album. Bear also stated about the album title that "usually the peace is within, so to have peace on the outside is the challenge. I kind of just wanted to call that out."

== Critical reception ==
Professional ratings
Aggregate scores
Source	Rating
AnyDecentMusic?	7.0/10
Metacritic	72/100
Review scores
Source	Rating
AllMusic	3.5/5 stars
Drowned in Sound	8/10
The Line of Best Fit	7/10
NME	3/5 stars
Pitchfork	7.4/10

Stereogum writer Tom Breihan said that "With Outer Peace, Bundick has given us a half-hour of playfully sleek synthpop, pulling in influences from house and R&B and straight-up future-pop. He sings many of his songs through Auto-Tune, which never muffles the bemused silliness in his voice." Jordan Lawrence of the Free Times opined that "It's the first Toro LP that isn't preoccupied with Bear's romantic insecurities and personal doubts", calling the album "yet another bold move, pushing decisively into Daft Punk-indebted modern disco and bleary-eyed Drake-ishness." NPR judged that "The variety of transformative production on Outer Peace speaks to Bundick's efforts to challenge himself, as well as listeners."

== Track listing ==
Outer Peace track listing
No.	Title	Length
1.	"Fading"	3:17
2.	"Ordinary Pleasure"	3:03
3.	"Laws of the Universe"	2:49
4.	"Miss Me" (featuring Abra)	3:00
5.	"New House"	2:30
6.	"Baby Drive It Down"	3:07
7.	"Freelance"	3:45
8.	"Who I Am"	3:28
9.	"Monte Carlo" (featuring Wet)	2:05
10.	"50-50" (featuring Instupendo)	3:26
Total length:		30:30

== Charts ==
Chart performance for Outer Peace
Chart (2019)	Peak position
US Billboard 200	114
US Top Alternative Albums (Billboard)	13
