= Boo Boo (album) =

Studio album by Toro y Moi
- Released: July 7, 2017
- Recorded: March 2016–March 2017
- Studio: Portland, Oregon
- Genre: Chillwave; psychedelic pop; hypnagogic pop
- Length: 49:11
- Label: Carpark
- Producer: Chaz Bear

Toro y Moi chronology
Samantha (2015)	Boo Boo (2017)	Outer Peace (2019)

Singles from Boo Boo
- 1. "Girl Like You" Released: June 9, 2017; 2. "You and I" Released: June 29, 2017

Boo Boo is the fifth studio album by Toro y Moi, released on July 7, 2017 via Carpark. "Girl Like You" was the first single from the album and was released on June 9, 2017. Toro y Moi cites Travis Scott, Daft Punk, Kashif, Gigi Masin, Frank Ocean, and Oneohtrix Point Never as inspiration for the album. Toro y Moi said the album was written to help "cope with an identity crisis caused by his growing popularity".

== Release ==
Toro y Moi released the album on July 7, 2017. One day before the release, Toro y Moi uploaded an album stream and short film to YouTube, which was directed and produced by Company Studio. The short film is a predominantly single-take, rotating evening shot from within the camper shell of a truck, featuring Chaz Bear sightseeing at Treasure Island, San Francisco before driving the truck to Grizzly Peak, Berkeley Hills to view the evening twilight over the Bay Area. The short is periodically overlaid with random scenes featuring Bear at a studio, which location has been featured in prior music videos for "Girl Like You" and "You and I".

== Critical reception ==
Professional ratings
Aggregate scores
Source	Rating
AnyDecentMusic?	7.0/10
Metacritic	73/100
Review scores
Source	Rating
AllMusic	3/5 stars
The Line of Best Fit	6.5/10
Pitchfork	6.9/10

At Metacritic, which assigns a normalized rating out of 100 to reviews from mainstream publications, the album received an average score of 73, based on 14 reviews, indicating "generally favorable reviews". Stereogum writer Tom Breihan named it "Album of the Week" and states Boo Boo "might just be the best Toro Y Moi album yet, partly because it sounds like all these past strains of his music whirled together and partly because it’s just a great album." Ian Cohen of Pitchfork writes, "Toro Y Moi's Chaz Bear sounds increasingly comfortable as a lead vocalist and personality on his most personal album to date, as a still-funky but more ambient side of his writing emerges."

== Track listing ==
All tracks are written by Chaz Bear.

No.	Title	Length
1.	"Mirage"	5:09
2.	"No Show"	3:14
3.	"Mona Lisa"	4:15
4.	"Pavement"	2:22
5.	"Don't Try"	4:25
6.	"Windows"	4:05
7.	"Embarcadero"	2:46
8.	"Girl Like You"	3:43
9.	"You and I"	3:51
10.	"Labyrinth"	4:01
11.	"Inside My Head"	4:11
12.	"W.I.W.W.T.W." (includes bonus track "Be", featuring Madeline Kenney)	7:08
Total length:		49:11

== Personnel ==
Adapted from the album liner notes.

- Chaz Bear – vocals, production, songwriter
- Greg Calbi – mastering
- Harry Israelson – cover artwork
- Patrick Jones – mixing (track 7)
- Madeline Kenney – vocals (track 12)
- Shade Standard – photography

== Charts ==
Chart (2017)	Peak position
US Billboard 200	136
US Independent Albums (Billboard)	5
US Top Alternative Albums (Billboard)	18
US Top Rock Albums (Billboard)	29
