= Anything in Return =

Studio album by Toro y Moi
- Released: January 22, 2013
- Studios: Different Fur Studios; (San Francisco, California)
- Genres: Synth-pop; indie pop; house; R&B
- Length: 52:06
- Label: Carpark
- Producer: Chaz Bundick

Toro y Moi chronology
June 2009 (2012)	Anything in Return (2013)	What For? (2015)

Singles from Anything in Return
- 1. "So Many Details" Released: December 4, 2012; 2. "Say That" Released: January 1, 2013

Professional ratings
Aggregate scores
Source	Rating
Metacritic	70/100
Review scores
Source	Rating
AllMusic	4/5 stars
The A.V. Club	C+
Clash	6/10
Drowned in Sound	7/10
The Guardian	4/5 stars
NME	6/10
Paste	8.0/10
Pitchfork	7.9/10
Rolling Stone	3.5/5 stars
Spin	6/10

Anything in Return is the third studio album by American recording artist Toro y Moi, released on January 22, 2013 by Carpark Records. Toro y Moi describes it as a "bigger sounding album, more accessible and poppy", as he lyrically wrestles between relationship problems and life on the road.

== Music videos ==
Toro y Moi released four music videos from the album. The video for "So Many Details", released on December 12, 2012, was directed by HARRYS. HARRYS also directed the second video from the album, "Say That", released on January 2, 2013. The music video for the song "Never Matter", directed by Steve Daniels and released on March 25, 2013, features a group of individuals listening to the track on headphones and dancing along. The fourth video, "Rose Quartz", featured animated paintings by artist Lauren Gregory.

== Use in other media ==
"Say That" was used during a January 2014 episode of the television show Grimm.

== Track listing ==
All tracks are written by Chaz Bundick.

No.	Title	Length
1.	"Harm in Change"	4:01
2.	"Say That"	4:44
3.	"So Many Details"	4:46
4.	"Rose Quartz"	4:13
5.	"Touch"	2:38
6.	"Cola"	3:33
7.	"Studies"	4:02
8.	"High Living"	4:19
9.	"Grown Up Calls"	3:28
10.	"Cake"	3:53
11.	"Day One"	4:17
12.	"Never Matter"	4:18
13.	"How's It Wrong"	3:54

== Personnel ==
Credits adapted from the liner notes of Anything in Return.

- Chaz Bundick – design, engineering, layout, mixing, performer, production
- Patrick Brown – engineering, mixing
- Jorge Hernandez – second engineering
- Joe Lambert – mastering
- John Stortz – drawing

== Charts ==
Chart (2013)	Peak position
Belgian Albums Chart (Flanders)	190
US Billboard 200	60
US Alternative Albums	14
US Dance/Electronic Albums	1
US Independent Albums	9

== Release history ==
Region	Date	Label
Japan	January 16, 2013	Hostess Entertainment
Australia	January 18, 2013	Mistletone Records
United Kingdom	January 21, 2013	Carpark Records
United States	January 22, 2013	Carpark Records
Germany	February 1, 2013	Carpark Records
