= Fated (album) =

Studio album by Nosaj Thing
- Released: May 4, 2015
- Genres: Electronic; hip-hop
- Length: 33:39
- Labels: Innovative Leisure; Timetable
- Producer: Nosaj Thing

Nosaj Thing chronology
Home (2013)	Fated (2015)	Parallels (2017)

Professional ratings
Aggregate scores
Source	Rating
Metacritic	63/100
Review scores
Source	Rating
AllMusic	3/5 stars
Consequence of Sound	C
Now	3/5
Pitchfork	7.2/10
PopMatters	5/10 stars
Slant Magazine	3/5 stars

Fated is the third studio album by American electronic musician Nosaj Thing. It was released on May 4, 2015.

== Critical reception ==
At Metacritic, which assigns a weighted average score out of 100 to reviews from mainstream critics, Fated received an average score of 63% based on 8 reviews, indicating "generally favorable reviews".

== Track listing ==
No.	Title	Length
1.	"Sci"	2:22
2.	"Don't Mind Me" (featuring Whoarei)	3:23
3.	"Realize"	1:34
4.	"Various"	1:33
5.	"Cold Stares" (featuring Chance the Rapper)	2:53
6.	"Watch"	2:18
7.	"UV3"	1:36
8.	"Let You"	2:54
9.	"Moon"	1:06
10.	"Erase"	1:58
11.	"Medic"	1:59
12.	"A"	2:00
13.	"Phase IV"	2:48
14.	"Light #5"	2:52
15.	"2K"	2:33

Japanese edition bonus track
No.	Title	Length
16.	"P8"	1:48

== Charts ==
Chart	Peak position
US Top Dance/Electronic Albums (Billboard)	9
