= Nosaj Thing =

American record producer and DJ (born 1985)

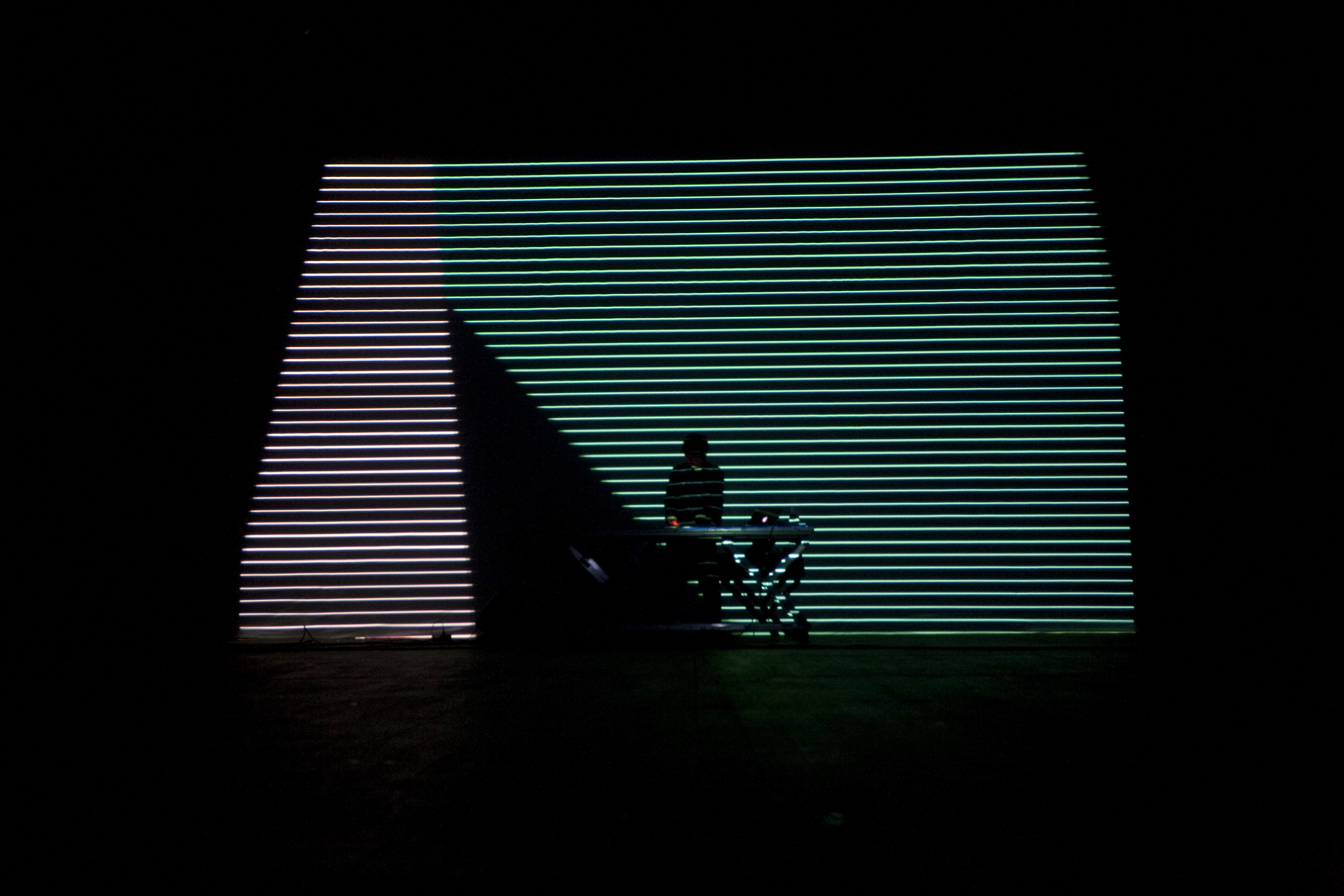
- Nosaj Thing performing in 2010

Background information
- Born: Jason Won Chung; January 27, 1985 (age 41)
- Origin: Los Angeles, California, U.S.
- Genres: Electronic; hip-hop; ambient; experimental; dance
- Occupations: Artist; Record producer; Sound designer; DJ; Media artist
- Years active: 2006–present
- Labels: Alpha Pup; Innovative Leisure; Timetable; LuckyMe
- Website: www.nosajthing.com

Jason Won Chung (born January 27, 1985), better known as Nosaj Thing, is an American electronic musician, record producer, DJ, and media artist from Los Angeles, California. He has produced tracks for Kendrick Lamar, Chance the Rapper, Kid Cudi, Tinashe, Toro Y Moi, serpentwithfeet, Eartheater, Julianna Barwick, and is the founder of Timetable Records.

== Biography ==
Jason W. Chung, known professionally as Nosaj Thing, is an American electronic musician, record producer, DJ, and media artist born in Los Angeles, California. He is of Korean descent and began making music using computers and synthesizers at the age of 12.

Chung first began performing at The Smell, developing a reputation for blending intricate soundscapes with emotive production. He self-released the debut EP, Views/Octopus, in 2006. His first studio album, Drift, was released on Alpha Pup Records in 2009, followed by a remix version, Drift Remixed, in 2010, curated by Chung and featuring contributions from artists such as Jamie xx and Jon Hopkins.

In 2012, he released a single, "Eclipse/Blue", which featured vocalist Kazu Makino. His second studio album, Home, was released in 2013. His third studio album, Fated, was released in 2015. In 2016, he released an EP, No Reality. His fourth studio album, Parallels, was released in 2017. His fifth studio album, Continua, was released in 2022.

In 2013, Chung founded the independent label Timetable Records. The label has released work by a variety of artists including Whoarei and Nosaj Thing.

Nosaj Thing has collaborated with artists including Kendrick Lamar, and has produced official remixes for artists such as Flying Lotus and Philip Glass. His creative output also extends to film scores, fashion presentations, art installations, and multimedia collaborations with Tokyo-based audiovisual artist Daito Manabe.

Recent collaborators include Hyukoh, Toro y Moi, Kazu Makino, Panda Bear, Pink Siifu, and Jacques Greene. In 2023, Chung and Greene released the collaborative single "Too Close," featuring Canadian singer Ouri. This was followed by "RB3" in 2024, marking the second release in their ongoing collaborative project titled "Verses GT". The duo had worked on a new dance-oriented project under their own title Verses GT, released in 2025.

== Career ==
=== Views/Octopus ===
His earliest performances were at Los Angeles' DIY avant-garde music venue The Smell and experimental hip-hop club night Low End Theory where he became part of a community of beat makers including Samiyam and Flying Lotus. He went on to self-release the debut EP, Views/Octopus, in 2006 featuring beats made throughout this early period.

=== Drift ===
His first studio album, Drift, was released on Alpha Pup Records in 2009. A remix version of the album, titled Drift Remixed, was released in 2010.

=== Subsequent Releases ===
Between 2012 and 2017, Thing released a further three full-length studio albums, an EP, and a single. In 2013, he founded the record label Timetable Records, featuring artists such as D Tiberio, Holodec, Gerry Read, Whoarei, 4THSEX, and Daito Manabe on the roster.

In 2020, Thing announced he had signed to LuckyMe Records, releasing the EP No Mind and the single "For The Light" with an accompanying music video.

In 2022, he released his fifth studio album Continua, featuring collaborations with Hyukoh, Toro y Moi, Kazu Makino, Serpentwithfeet, Sam Gendel, Coby Sey, Julianna Barwick, Mike Andrews, Slauson Malone, Pink Siifu, Panda Bear, and Eyedress.

Between 2023 and 2024, he began a collaborative dance-focused project with Jacques Greene. Their first single, "Too Close", featuring Canadian singer Ouri, was released in 2023.

=== Live ===
Throughout 2009 and 2010 he toured a live audiovisual show, featuring large scale video projections of live manipulated graphics, with showcase performances at Sónar Festival, Pop Montreal and São Paulo Museum of Image and Sound.

In 2016 Thing collaborated with Japanese artist Daito Manabe to create a touring show featuring real-time augmented reality visuals using multiple Kinect cameras on stage. The debut performance at Coachella Festival was described by Pitchfork Magazine as "runaway winner for best visual production" and was billed by Sónar Festival as "extremely captivating, technologically advanced, show of inordinate beauty".

== Discography ==
=== Studio albums ===
- Drift (2009)
- Home (2013)
- Fated (2015)
- Parallels (2017)
- Continua (2022)
- Verses GT with Jacques Greene (2025)

=== Remix albums ===
- Drift Remixed (2010)

=== EPs ===
- Views/Octopus (2006)
- No Reality (2016)
- No Mind (2020)

=== Singles ===
- "Night Crawler" (2010)
- "Eclipse/Blue" featuring Kazu Makino (2012)
- "For the Light" (2020)

=== Productions ===
- Kid Cudi – "Man on the Moon (The Anthem)" from A Kid Named Cudi (2008) and Man on the Moon: The End of Day (2009)
- Busdriver – "Split Seconds (Between Nannies and Swamis)" from Jhelli Beam (2009)
- Kendrick Lamar – "Cloud 10" (2011)
- Chance the Rapper – "Paranoia" from Acid Rap (2013)
- Toro y Moi – "Enough of You" (2015)
- KUČKA – "Real" from Wrestling (2019)
- Park Hye Jin – "Clouds" (2020)
- Kid Cudi – "Another Day" from Man on the Moon III: The Chosen (2020)
- Jamie Isaac – 3 (2020)
- Julianna Barwick – "Nod" from Healing Is a Miracle (2020)
- Eyedress – "Uncomfortable" from FULL TIME LOVER (2022)
- Tinashe – "Talk to Me Nice" from BB/ANG3L (2023)
- Tinashe – "No Simulation" and "Getting No Sleep" from Quantum Baby (2024)
- serpentwithfeet – "Damn Gloves" and "Hummin" from Grip (2024)
- Eartheater – "Nova" (2025)
- Justine Skye – "Heart Attack" from Candy (2026)
- TYSON – "The Edge" (2026)

=== Remixes ===
- Flying Lotus – "Camel" (2008)
- Charlotte Gainsbourg – "Heaven Can Wait" (2009)
- The xx – "Islands" (2010)
- Philip Glass – "Knee 1" (2012)
- Jon Hopkins – "Open Eye Signal" (2013)
- Little Dragon – "Klapp Klapp" (2014)
- BADBADNOTGOOD featuring Charlotte Day Wilson – "In Your Eyes" (2017)
- Kazu Makino – "Salty" (2019)
- HYUKOH – "World of the Forgotten" (2021)
