= Eric André =

American comedian and actor (born 1983)

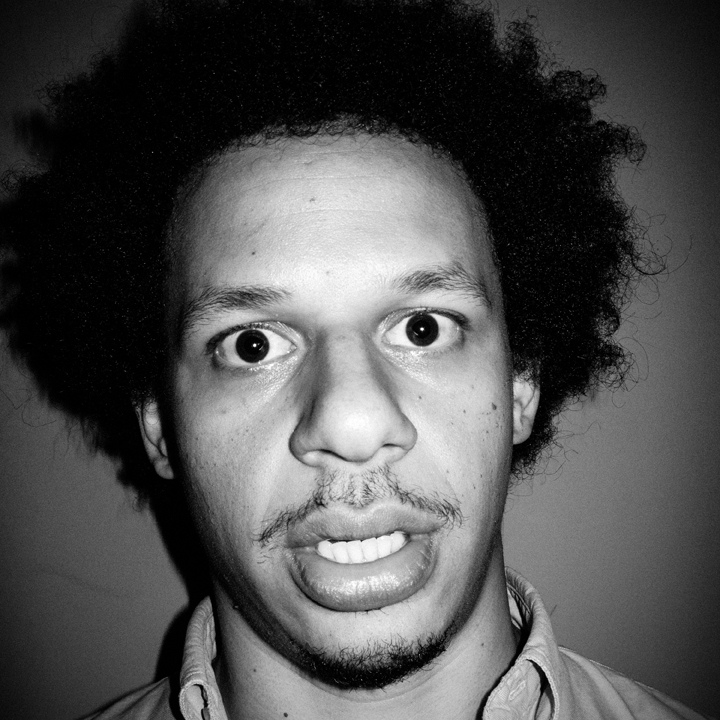
- André in June 2012
- Born: Eric Samuel André; April 4, 1983 (age 43); Boca Raton, Florida, U.S.
- Education: Berklee College of Music (BM)

Comedy career
- Years active: 2003–present
- Medium: Film; stand-up; television
- Genres: Surreal comedy; shock humor; improvisational comedy; anti-humor; cringe comedy; black comedy; sketch comedy

Eric André (born April 4, 1983) is an American comedian, actor, singer, television host, writer, producer, and musician. He is best known as the creator, host, and co-writer of the Adult Swim surreal comedy series The Eric Andre Show (2012–2023). His other notable roles include Mike on the FXX comedy series Man Seeking Woman (2015–2017), and Stuart Clarke in the Marvel Cinematic Universe miniseries Ironheart. He also performs music under the stage name Blarf.

His voice acting career includes Disenchantment (2018–23), The Lion King (2019), The Mitchells vs. The Machines, Sing 2 (both 2021), and Trolls Band Together (2023).

== Early life ==
Eric Samuel André was born in Boca Raton, Florida, on April 4, 1983. His mother is an American of Ashkenazi Jewish descent from New York's Upper West Side, and his father was a Haitian immigrant who worked as a psychiatrist. He identifies as both Black and Jewish. In 2001, after graduating from Dreyfoos School of the Arts in West Palm Beach, Florida, he studied at Berklee College of Music in Boston, where he played the double bass and graduated in 2005 with a Bachelor of Music degree.

== Career ==
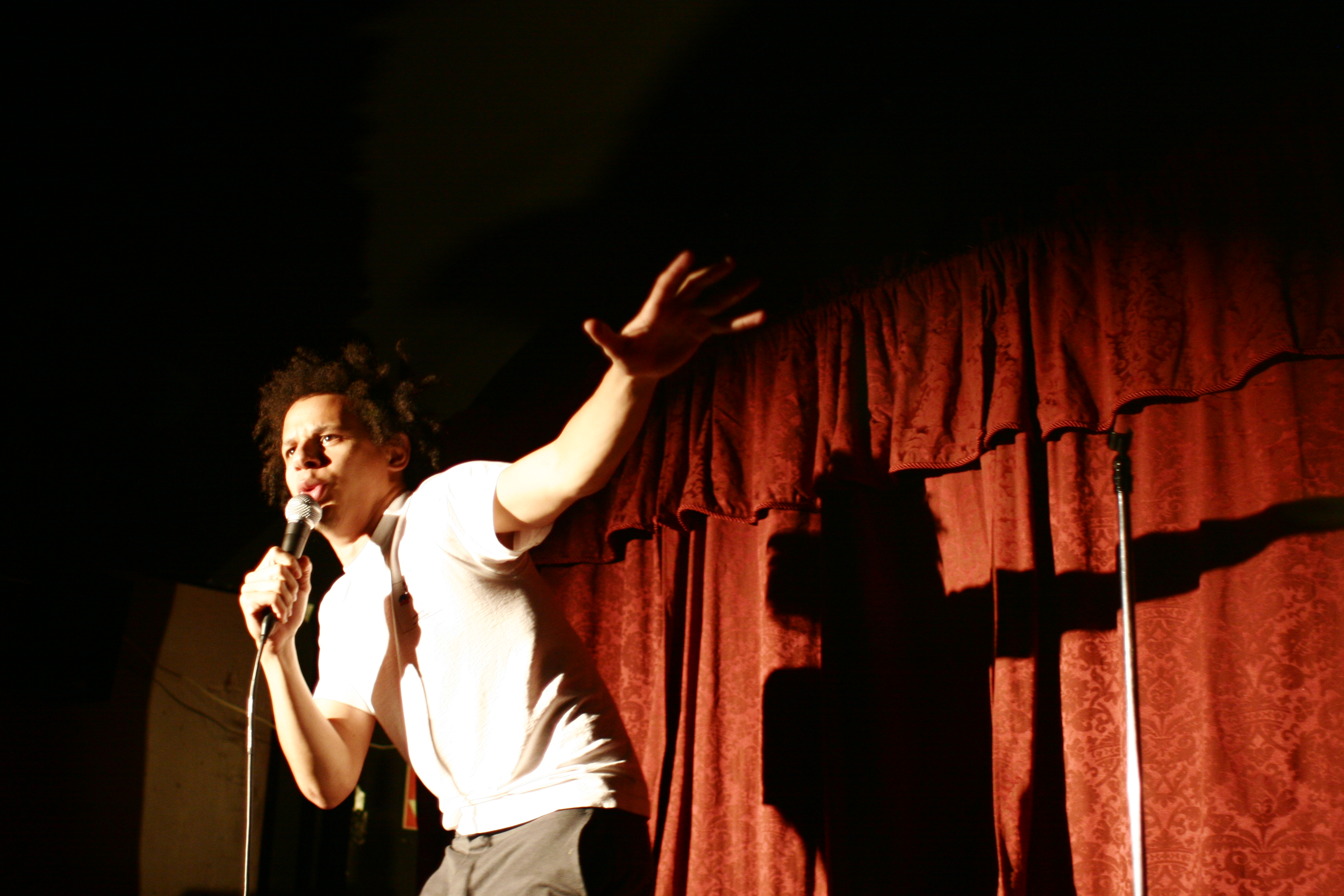
André performing in July 2007

André began his comedy career in 2003. He is the creator and host of The Eric Andre Show, a parody of public access talk shows, on Cartoon Network's late night programming block Adult Swim. The show features pranks, shock humor, sketches, and celebrity interviews. He co-starred as Mark on the ABC comedy series Don't Trust the B— in Apartment 23, and guest-starred on 2 Broke Girls as Deke, Max's love interest and fellow pastry student. He played Mike in the FXX comedy series Man Seeking Woman, which premiered in 2015.

He voices Luci in the Netflix animated show Disenchantment. His first standup special on Netflix, Legalize Everything, was released on June 23, 2020. In 2021, he created and starred in the Netflix prank comedy film Bad Trip.

André is a signatory of the Film Workers for Palestine boycott pledge that was published in September 2025.

He directed the music video for the song "C.O.P" from the mixtape E.T.D.S. (2026), by British-American rapper IDK.

In June 2026, André appeared on WWE Raw during a segment involving The Bloodline. After interacting with Jacob Fatu's ula fala at ringside, Fatu pulled André into the ring and attacked him.

== Personal life ==
André dated actress Rosario Dawson from 2016 to 2017. In March 2021, he said that he was in a relationship with a woman he had met at a farmer's market who did not know he was well known until after they started dating.

André is a self-described agnostic atheist and a practitioner of Transcendental Meditation. He openly takes whippets as a way to reduce his anxiety.

When addressing his views on sexuality in a 2016 interview, he said, "I think everyone is bi, right? There's no such thing as sexual orientation, or race, or gender. Those are all obsolete man-made concepts. I'll say it again, a hole is a hole." He was then asked if he was coming out as bisexual, to which he responded, "I'll fuck anything that moves."

He endorsed Democratic candidate Bernie Sanders in the 2020 presidential election.

In October 2022, André and fellow comedian Clayton English filed a federal lawsuit against Clayton County, Georgia, claiming that they were subjected to a police program that racially profiled, coerced, and illegally searched passengers boarding planes for drugs at Hartsfield–Jackson Atlanta International Airport without reasonable suspicion. Their lawsuit challenged the constitutionality of the program. The district court dismissed the lawsuit based on qualified immunity of the police. André and English appealed this decision to the United States Court of Appeals for the Eleventh Circuit in January 2024.

In 2024, André signed the "Film Workers for Palestine" boycott, a campaign that denounces Israeli film institutions for their role in the war in Gaza. He has also shared social media posts critical of Israel's military actions and has called for a permanent ceasefire. André participated in a protest organized by Jewish Voice for Peace against the Gaza genocide.

In July 2026, after the 2026 FIFA World Cup Final, he posted a series of Instagram stories criticizing the Argentine national football team, accusing Argentinians of being racist, genocidal, and Nazis.

== Filmography ==
Key
†	Denotes productions that have not yet been released

=== Film ===
Year	Title	Role	Notes
2009	The Invention of Lying	Man No. 4	Cameo
2010	The Awkward Comedy Show	Himself	Featured comedian
2010	Thin Skin	Passenger	Short film
2012	Should've Been Romeo	Buzz	
2013	The Internship	Sid	
2015	Flock of Dudes	Mook	
2016	Popstar: Never Stop Never Stopping	Dreadlocked CMZ reporter	
2017	Rough Night	Jake	
2019	The Lion King	Banzai	
2021	Bad Trip	Chris Carey	Also writer and producer
2021	The Mitchells vs. the Machines	Mark Bowman (voice)	
2021	Sing 2	Darius (voice)	
2022	Jackass Forever	Himself	Writer and guest appearances
2022	Animal Attraction	Darius (voice)	Short film
2022	Jackass 4.5	Himself	Writer and guest appearances
2023	Trolls Band Together	John Dory (voice)	
2025	Happy Gilmore 2	Steiner	
2026	Balls Up	Eco Warrior Aaron	
2026	I Love Boosters	Futuristic Police Tank Cop	
2026	Little Brother	Marcus Pinchel	
2026	Street Fighter	Don Sauvage	
2027	Animal Friends †	TBA	Post-production

=== Television ===
Year	Title	Role	Notes
2009	Curb Your Enthusiasm	Set P.A.	2 episodes
2010	The Big Bang Theory	Joey	Episode: "The 21-Second Excitation"
2011	Zeke and Luther	Zorn	Episode: "Skate Troopers"
2011	Hot in Cleveland	Jeff	Episode: "Elka's Wedding"
2011	Fact Checkers Unit	Mirage	Episode: "Excessive Gass"
2011	Level Up	Max Ross	Television film
2012–2013	Don't Trust the B— in Apartment 23	Mark Reynolds	22 episodes
2012–2023	The Eric Andre Show	Himself	Creator, host, writer and executive producer
2013–2014	2 Broke Girls	Deacon "Deke" Bromberg	8 episodes
2014	Lucas Bros. Moving Co.	Various characters (voice)	2 episodes
2014	Comedy Bang! Bang!	Himself	Episode: "Eric Andre Wears a Cat Collage Shirt & Sneakers"
2015, 2026	Robot Chicken	Various characters (voice)	1 episode and 1 special
2015—2021	Ridiculousness	Himself	3 episodes
2015–2017	Man Seeking Woman	Mike	30 episodes
2016	Animals	Alex	Voice, episode: "Cats."
2016	Traveling the Stars: Action Bronson and Friends Watch Ancient Aliens	Himself	Episode: "Founding Fathers"
2016	American Dad!	The Drifter	Voice, episode: "Stan Smith Is Keanu Reeves as Stanny Utah in Point Breakers"
2017	Michael Bolton's Big, Sexy Valentine's Day Special	Baby Archer	Variety special
2018	Mostly 4 Millennials		Executive producer
2018–2023	Disenchantment	Luci / Pendergast	Voice, 50 episodes
2020	Legalize Everything	Himself	Stand up special on Netflix
2021	Archer	Colt / The Professor	Voice, 3 episodes
2022	The Righteous Gemstones	Lyle Lisson	Season 2
2022	Impractical Jokers	Himself	2 episodes
2022	Guillermo del Toro's Cabinet of Curiosities	Randall Roth	Episode: "The Viewing", Episode 7
2023	The Prank Panel	Himself	Host; also executive producer
2025	Abbott Elementary	Cedric	Episode: "Testing"
2025	Ironheart	Stuart Clarke / Rampage	Episode: "Take Me Home"
2026	WWE Raw	Himself	Episode dated 16 June 2026
2026	Futurama	Luci / Pendergrast	Voice; Episode: "A New New York Yankee in King Elfo's Court"

=== Web ===
Year	Title	Role	Notes
2010	Laugh Track Mash-Ups	Parker Leon	Episode: "At Your Sir-vice"
2013	Getting Doug with High	Himself	1 episode
2013	The ArScheerio Paul Show	Flavor Flav	Episode: "Vanilla Ice & Flavor Flav"
2016-2020	Hot Ones	Himself	2 episodes
2020-2023	Steve-O's Wild Ride!	Himself	Podcast; 2 episodes
2021	Wikipedia: Fact or Fiction?	Himself	1 episode
2022	Toro y Moi: Goes By So Fast	Panther	Film accompanying Mahal
2024	Chicken Shop Date	Himself	1 episode

== Discography ==
=== Albums ===
Title	Release date	Record label	Notes
BLARF (EP)	December 25, 2014	Self-released	with The First Seed
Cease & Desist (LP)	June 26, 2019	Stones Throw Records	as Blarf
Film Scores for Films That Don't Exist	May 1, 2026	Stones Throw Records	as Blarf

=== Guest appearances ===
Title	Lead artist(s)	Release date	Album
"Eric's Advice (Skit)"	Nocando	March 18, 2014	Jimmy the Burnout
"Intro" and "PSA"	OG Swaggerdick	August 9, 2019	Views from the Dick
"Love Me in My Heart" (as Eric "Scratch" Andre)	Lee "Scratch" Perry & Mr. Green	August 23, 2019	Super Ape vs. 緑: Open Door
"Face"	Detahjae	November 10, 2025	Flare

== Awards ==
André won a 2024 Emmy Award for Outstanding Performer in a Short Form Comedy or Drama Series for The Eric Andre Show.
