= Teen Daze =

Canadian electronic musician

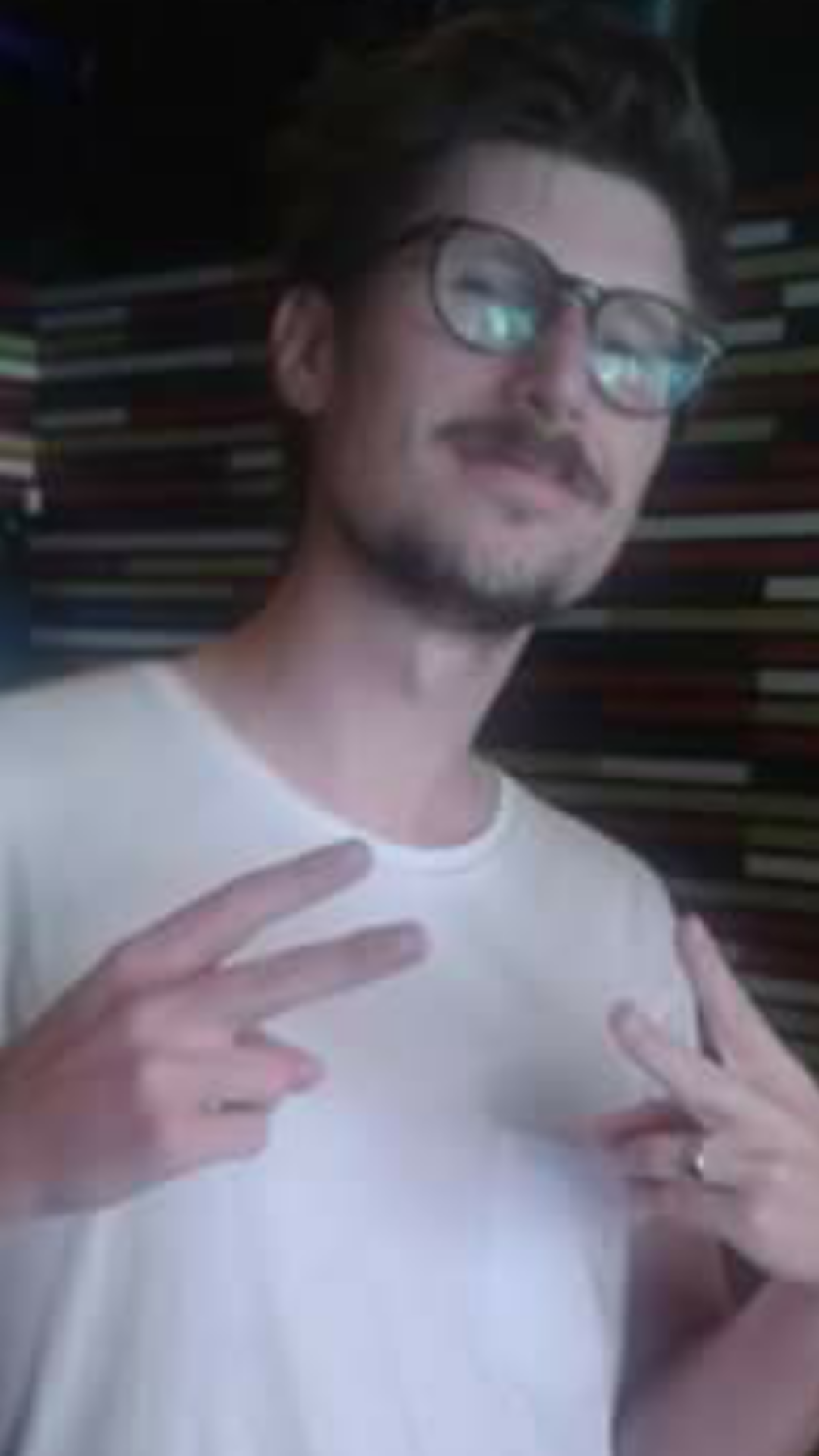

Background information
- Born: Jamison Jon Baerg Isaak
- Origin: Abbotsford, British Columbia, Canada
- Genres: Chillwave; house; ambient; indie pop
- Years active: 2010–present

Jamison Jon Baerg Isaak, better known as Teen Daze, is a Canadian electronic musician originally from Abbotsford, British Columbia.

His first albums were released in 2010, attracting the attention of online music press outlets such as Pitchfork Media. Signing with Lefse Records, he released the full-length All of Us Together in 2012, followed quickly by Glacier in 2013. On his 2015 John Vanderslice-produced album Morning World, Teen Daze shifted from an electronic-driven style with elements of chillwave, house, and ambient to more of an indie pop sound, adding his own vocals.

Teen Daze released Interior in 2021, describing it as "an album of first loves refracted through prisms of wisdom, wounds, and wonder." The album won the Juno Award for Electronic Album of the Year at the Juno Awards of 2023.

== Discography ==
=== Albums ===
- My Bedroom Floor (self-released, 2010)
- Four More Years (self-released, 2010)
- The Inner Mansions (Lefse Records, 2012)
- All of Us Together (Lefse, 2012)
- Glacier (Lefse, 2013)
- Morning World (Paper Bag Records, 2015)
- Themes for Dying Earth (Flora, 2017)
- Themes for a New Earth (Flora, 2017)
- Bioluminescence (Flora, 2019)
- Interior (Cascine, 2021)
- Elegant Rhythms (Easy Listening Recordings, 2024)

=== EPs ===
- Beach Dreams (self-released, 2010)
- A Silent Planet (Waaga Records, 2011)
- Reinterprets Selections From "Mend" By Geotic (Cultus Vibes, 2011)
- Tour EP (self-released, 2011)
- A World Away (Plancha Records, 2015)
- Rainwater Coffee (self-released, 2015)
- Pure Water (Inspired by 'The Outlaw Ocean' a book by Ian Urbina) (self-released, 2020)
- Reality Refresh (self-released, 2020)
- Reality Refresh 2 (self-released, 2020)
- Reality Refresh 3 (self-released, 2020)
- Reality Refresh 4 (self-released, 2020)
- Breathing Tides (self-released, 2021)
- Natural Movement (self-released, 2023)
- Fountains of the World (self-released, 2023)
- The Wind Surfer (self-released, 2023)
- Quiet City (Easy Listening Recordings, 2023)
- Splashes of Colour (Easy Listening Recordings, 2025)

=== Singles ===
- "Together" b/w "Something" (Cultus Vibes, 2011)
- "Let's Groove" (self-released, 2011)
- "Moving Forward" b/w "Tokyo" (self-released, 2025)
- "Fashionably Late" b/w "In the Moment" (self-released, 2025)
