= Madeline Kenney =

American singer-songwriter

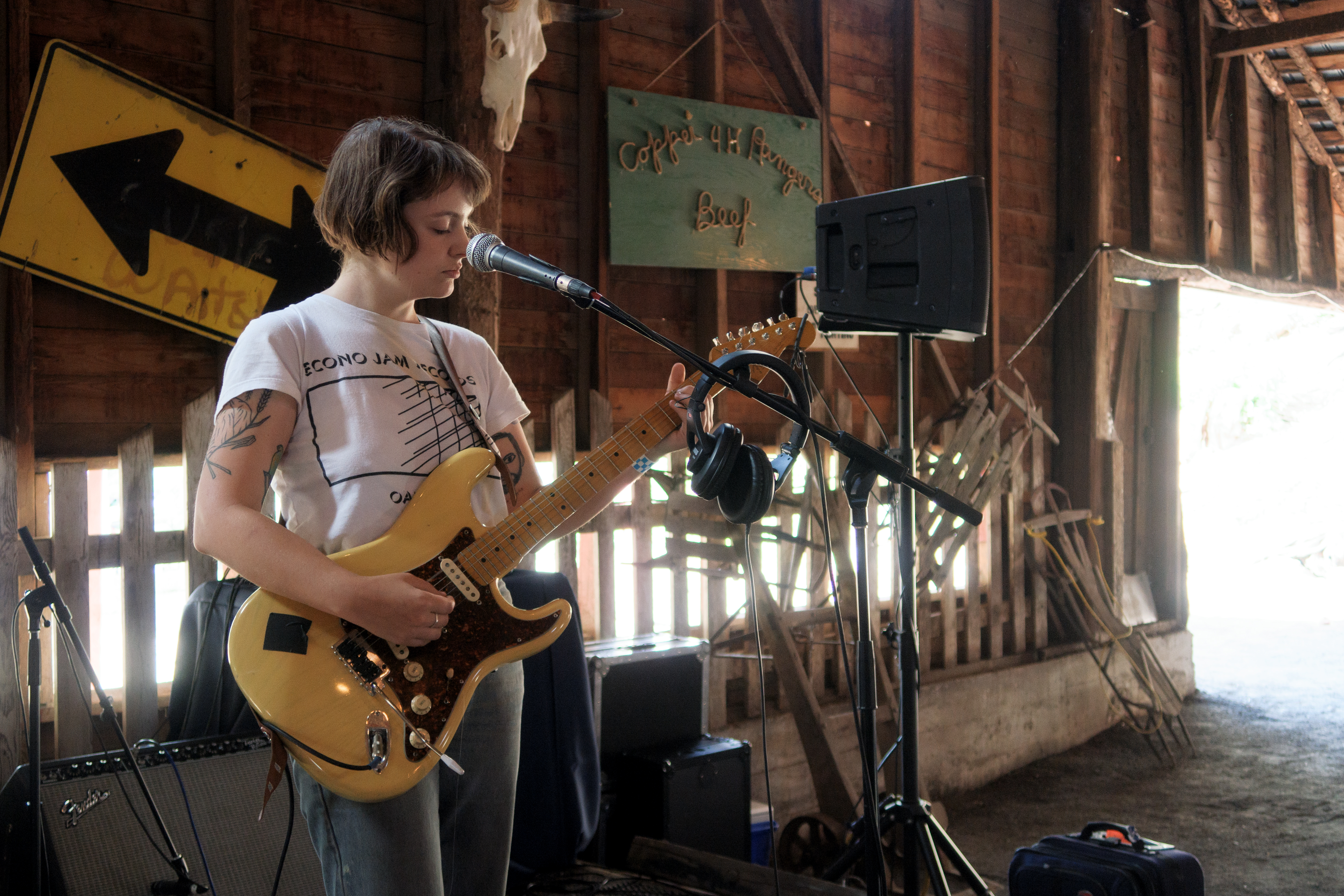
- Kenney in 2019

Background information
- Born: Madeline Claire Kenney; November 17, 1991 (age 34); Seattle, Washington
- Origin: Oakland, California
- Genre: Indie rock
- Occupations: Singer; songwriter
- Label: Company

Madeline Claire Kenney (born 17 November 1991) is an American indie rock singer-songwriter based in Oakland, California.

== Early life and career ==
Born and raised in Seattle, Kenney started playing piano at the age of five and joined multiple bands.

In 2016, she released the extended play Signals, and in 2017, she released her debut studio album Night Night at the First Landing on Company Records. Both the records were produced by Chaz Bear, also known as Toro y Moi. A follow-up album, Perfect Shapes, was released in October 2018, with Jenn Wasner of Wye Oak producing. On January 22, 2021, Kenney surprise-released her EP Summer Quarter.

She released her fourth album, A New Reality Mind, on July 28, 2023.

== Artistry ==
Regarding her fourth album A New Reality Mind, Kenney named Jenny Hval, Laurie Anderson, The Blue Nile, Deradoorian, Stephen Steinbrink, Shabason & Krgovich, Arthur Russell, Laura Jean, Westerman and Beth Orton as influences.

== Discography ==
=== Studio albums ===
| Title | Details |
|---|---|
| Night Night at the First Landing | Released: September 1, 2017; Label: Company Records; Format: Digital download, CD |
| Perfect Shapes | Released: October 5, 2018; Label: Carpark; Format: Digital download, CD, LP |
| Sucker's Lunch | Released: July 31, 2020; Label: Carpark; Format: Digital download, CD |
| A New Reality Mind | Released: July 28, 2023; Label: Carpark; Format: Digital download, CD |
| Kiss From The Balcony | Released: July 18, 2025; Label: Carpark; Format: Digital download, CD, LP |

=== Extended plays ===
| Title | Details |
|---|---|
| Signals | Released: June 3, 2016; Label: Company Records; Format: Digital download |
| Summer Quarter | Released: January 22, 2021; Label: Carpark |

=== Singles ===
| Title | Year |
|---|---|
| "Rita" | 2017 |
| "Always" | 2017 |
