= Rome Fortune =

American rapper (born 1988)

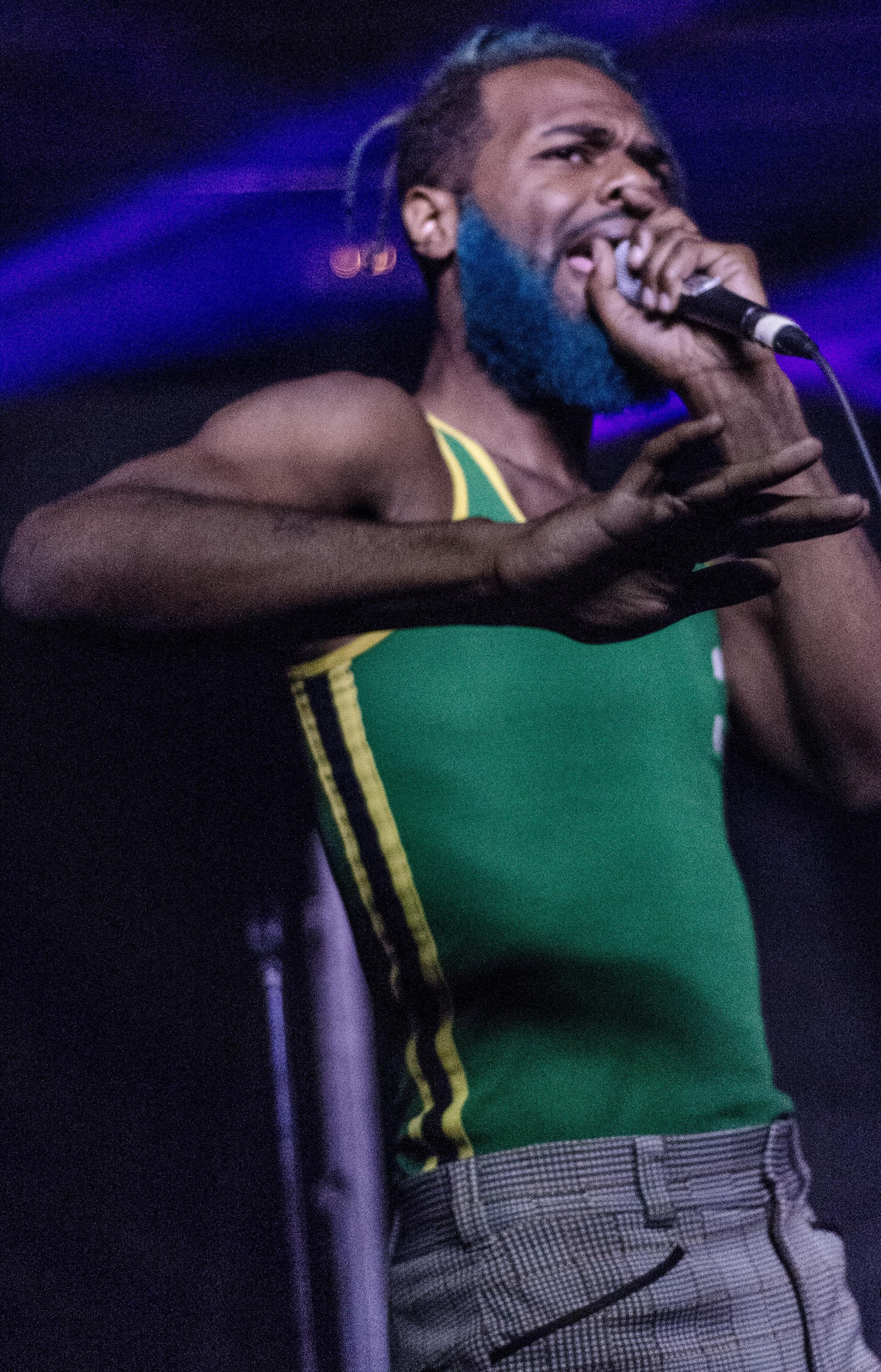
- Fortune performing in May 2016

Background information
- Born: Jerome Raheem Fortune; October 13, 1988 (age 37)
- Genre: Hip hop
- Occupations: Rapper; songwriter
- Years active: 2011–present
- Label: Fogwood Records

Jerome Raheem "Rome" Fortune (born October 13, 1988) is an American rapper. who rose to prominence after the release of his Beautiful Pimp mixtape in 2013. Influenced by a diverse range of musical traditions, Fortune has released 6 EPs and has collaborated with a number of artists from the Atlanta hip hop scene, including OG Maco, Dun Deal, and ILoveMakonnen.

== Life and career ==
Born in Philadelphia, Pennsylvania, Fortune comes from a family of musicians and is related to cornetist Nat Adderley and saxophonist Cannonball Adderley. He began rapping in high school and claims that he shortened his name because his birth name, "Jerome," reminded him of an aging pimp character from Martin Lawrence's Martin TV series. Fortune considers his grandfather, jazz musician Richard Adderley, to be one of the most influential figures in his life. Adderley co-produced and played the vibraphone on Fortune's Beautiful Pimp II EP and is featured in the music video for the track "OneDay".

Pitchfork named Beautiful Pimp one of their "Overlooked Mixtapes of 2013." In the summer of 2014, Fortune joined British indie-rock group Glass Animals for their U.S. and U.K. tours.

In January 2015, Fortune announced via Twitter that he was turning himself into police custody for unknown reasons. Fortune was booked into the Cobb County Jail in Marietta, Georgia on January 16, 2015 and announced his release on February 6, 2015. Fortune joined IAMSU's "Eyes on Me" North American tour in March 2015.

Though Fortune's early EP The Air Mattress (2011) was released on Wil May's Makeshift label, he was unsigned until late 2015, when he was backed by Fool's Gold Records. Fortune released his debut album, Jerome Raheem Fortune, in 2016.

In summer of 2024 Fortune signed with record label Fogwood Records.

== Artistry ==
=== Influences ===
Fortune has stated that he is influenced by 90s rap, particularly DMX, whose Flesh of My Flesh, Blood of My Blood he cites as the "rap album that changed [his] life". Fortune also draws inspiration from jazz, considering it "pretty much parallel to hip-hop."

=== Musical style ===
Fortune's style frequently combines regional hip hop traditions, such as the blending of ratchet and trap music elements on Beautiful Pimp. He entered the world of electronic music for his Small VVorld EP, which features a number of tracks produced by U.K. electronic artist Four Tet.

== Discography ==
=== Albums ===
- Jerome Raheem Fortune (2016)
- Freek (2020)

=== EPs ===
- The Air Mattress (2011)
- Voyeur (with Childish Major) (2012)
- Beautiful Pimp II (2014)
- Drive, Thighs, & Lies (with Dun Deal) (2014)
- Yep (with OG Maco) (2015)
- Toro y Rome Vol.1 (with Toro y Moi) (2018)

=== Mixtapes ===
- Lolo (2012)
- Beautiful Pimp (2013)
- Small VVorld (2014)
- loloU (2015)
- Vvorldvvide Pimpsation (2016)
- Banned by Kaytranada (2024)

=== Collaborations ===
- "Stripes" (with Gucci Mane & Bankroll Fresh) (2014)
- "Hazey" (with Glass Animals) (2014)
- "Drop That Ass on the Ground Like Some Change" (with Ethereal & Relly Jade)
- "Rollin'" (with Brenmar & Lil Uzi Vert) (2014)
- "Lights Low" (with Four Tet) (2014)
- "Men of Glass" (with Sevdaliza) (2015)
- "No Ma'am" (with IloveMakonnen & Rich the Kid) (2016)
- "Buried" (with What So Not) (2016)
- "Leave It" (with ƱZ) (2018)
- "Dr Feel Right" (with Josh Baker & the Egyptian Lover) (2025)
