= Causers of This =

Studio album by Toro y Moi
- Released: January 4, 2010
- Genre: Chillwave
- Length: 32:55
- Label: Carpark
- Producer: Toro y Moi

Toro y Moi chronology
Causers of This (2010)	Underneath the Pine (2011)

Singles from Causers of This
- 1. "Blessa" Released: October 5, 2009

Causers of This is the debut album from the artist Toro y Moi, released on January 4, 2010, on Carpark Records.

== Reception ==
Professional ratings
Aggregate scores
Source	Rating
Metacritic	71/100
Review scores
Source	Rating
AllMusic	3.5/5 stars
Consequence of Sound	C+
NME	4/5 stars
The Phoenix	3/4 stars
Pitchfork	7.6/10

Causers of This received generally positive reviews, Metacritic reports a rating of 71% based on 18 critical reviews.

Pitchfork's Joe Colly stated that "Bundick embraces a cleaner and mellower sound that's more indebted to hip-hop. He wears his inspirations proudly, and throughout there's a clear nod to producers like J Dilla and Flying Lotus."

Indie Shuffle's Jason Grishkoff noted that "[Causers of This] will slot comfortably into your record collection next to contemporaries such as Small Black, Washed Out, Gold Panda and Neon Indian – artists from all around the world who, intended or not, are coming out with markedly similar musical results."

== Track listing ==
No.	Title	Length
1.	"Blessa"	2:43
2.	"Minors"	3:02
3.	"Imprint After"	3:03
4.	"Lissoms"	2:13
5.	"Fax Shadow"	2:51
6.	"Thanks Vision"	3:44
7.	"Freak Love"	2:51
8.	"Talamak"	2:27
9.	"You Hid"	3:24
10.	"Low Shoulder"	3:35
11.	"Causers of This"	3:02

CD edition
No.	Title	Length
11.	"Causers of This" (with hidden track "Timed Pleasure")	6:07

iTunes edition
No.	Title	Length
12.	"Eden"	4:28

Amazon edition
No.	Title	Length
12.	"Cold Sheets"	2:49

Australian bonus track edition
No.	Title	Length
12.	"Cold Sheets"	2:49
13.	"Tidals"	3:24
14.	"Well Tusked"	3:44
15.	"Eden"	4:29

== Legacy ==
The album is noted to have had a large impact on the music in South Carolina over the decade following its release, as the state had previously been known mainly for country and roots rock.
