= What For? (album) =

Studio album by Toro y Moi
- Released: April 7, 2015
- Genre: Indie rock; psychedelic rock; indie pop; soft rock; psychedelic pop
- Length: 36:38
- Label: Carpark
- Producer: Chaz Bundick

Toro y Moi chronology
Anything in Return (2013)	What For? (2015)	Samantha (2015)

Singles from What For?
- 1. "Empty Nesters" Released: January 19, 2015; 2. "Buffalo" Released: March 3, 2015; 3. "Run Baby Run" Released: March 25, 2015

Professional ratings
Aggregate scores
Source	Rating
Metacritic	72/100
Review scores
Source	Rating
AllMusic	4/5 stars
Consequence of Sound	C
Pitchfork	6.6/10

What For? is the fourth studio album by American recording artist Toro y Moi (also known as Chaz Bear), released on April 7, 2015, by Carpark Records. The album includes 10 tracks at a run time of 36:38. Prior to the album release, Toro y Moi revealed three teaser tracks. These tracks include: "Empty Nesters", "Buffalo", and "Run Baby Run". This release follows his 2013 studio album Anything in Return.

The album debuted on The Billboard 200 on April 4, 2015. The record peaked at 123rd position and stayed on the Billboard 200 chart for one week. On the Top Rock Albums Billboard charts, the record peaked at the 26th position. The album was on the Rock Albums chart for 1 week. Prior to this release, Chaz's Anything in Return album was also on The Billboard 200 chart. The album ranked in the 60th position on February 9, 2013. Ever since 2011, all of Toro y Moi's studio albums have peaked on The Billboard 200 chart.

== Background ==
Prior to his release of What For?, Chaz was known as an early pioneer for the late 2000's genre of chillwave. In Chaz's fourth album, he pursued a stylistic change to a pop-guitar/indie-rock sound rather than continuing his trend of exploring synth-pop, electronic, and house music. When approaching his fourth studio album, Chaz states in an article that: “I’ve done electronic R&B and more traditional recorded type R&B stuff – I just wanted to see what else was out there”. Many reputable news sources when evaluating the What For? album likened it to 70's "indie rock". An NPR article discussed how Chaz's new sound can also be likened to those during the 70's heyday.

== Music videos ==
During the What For? album cycle, Toro y Moi had released a series of three music videos. The songs with videos include: "Half Dome", "Lilly", and "Empty Nesters". The first video for this album was "Empty Nesters". The video was released on February 19, 2015. The video is shot, written, and directed by Chaz Bear. The video was released a month after the premiere of the song on Zane Lowe's BBC Radio show. The video for "Lilly" was released on April 30, 2015, and was directed by HARRYS. The final video for the What If? album cycle was "Half Dome". The video was released on September 18, 2015, and was directed by R. Adam Prieto. The video includes visuals of Chaz exploring the Yosemite National Park.

== Album tour ==
During 2015, Chaz had two tours in relation to his What For? album release. The first set of tour dates took place between February and May 2015. The first tour consisted of only North American tour dates. While on tour, Chaz was accompanied by a variety of different artists who opened for him. These artists include: Vinyl Williams, Mattson 2, and Keath Mead. Chaz began the tour in the Oakland, California; where his current residence is. The concert took place on February 26 at the New Parish concert venue. While on the tour, Chaz performed at the Hangout Music Festival and Coachella. During his time at Coachella, he recorded a short EP based on his live performance. The EP was titled: Spotify Sessions. It included live versions of tracks from the What For? album. These tracks include: "What You Want", "Buffalo", "Empty Nesters", "The Flight", and "Yeah Right". The first tour of the year concluded in Austin, Texas. The final concert took place on May 20 at Emo's Austin concert venue. Chaz was accompanied by Keath Mead during this final performance.

The second set of tour dates took place between June and November 2015. While on his second tour of the year, Chaz played at a variety of venues and festivals worldwide. These festivals include: Outside Lands, Capitol Hill, Super Bock Super Rock Festival, Lollapalooza, and many more. The second tour also began in the Bay Area. Chaz performed at the Rickshaw Stop venue in San Francisco, on June 30. The second tour concluded at the Fun Fun Fun Fest in Austin, Texas. The festival took place between November 6 and 8 of 2015. Chaz performed in 74 live performances throughout the year of 2015 for his What For? album cycle.

== Track listing ==
No.	Title	Length
1.	"What You Want"	3:26
2.	"Buffalo"	3:17
3.	"The Flight"	3:59
4.	"Empty Nesters"	3:43
5.	"Ratcliff"	2:41
6.	"Lilly"	4:27
7.	"Spell It Out"	2:54
8.	"Half Dome"	3:15
9.	"Run Baby Run"	2:45
10.	"Yeah Right"	6:11
Total length:		36:38

Japanese edition bonus tracks
No.	Title	Length
14.	"Goon"	3:22
15.	"Julian"	3:15
Total length:		43:25

== Personnel ==
- Chaz Bundick – vocals, guitars, keyboards, bass guitar, drums, percussion, design, engineering, layout, mixing, production
- Anthony Ferraro – piano (3)
- Aaron Gold – drums (3)
- Patrick Jeffords – bass (10)
- Julian Lynch – clarinet, saxophone and synthesizer (10)
- Keath Mead – guitars (7)
- Ruban Nielson – guitars and background vocals (8)
- Andy Woodward – drums (4, 7, 8, 9, 10)
- Christos – artwork
- Steve Fallone – mastering
- Patrick Jones – mixing
- Josh Terris – photography
