= Toro y Moi =

American singer, producer, and graphic designer (born 1986)

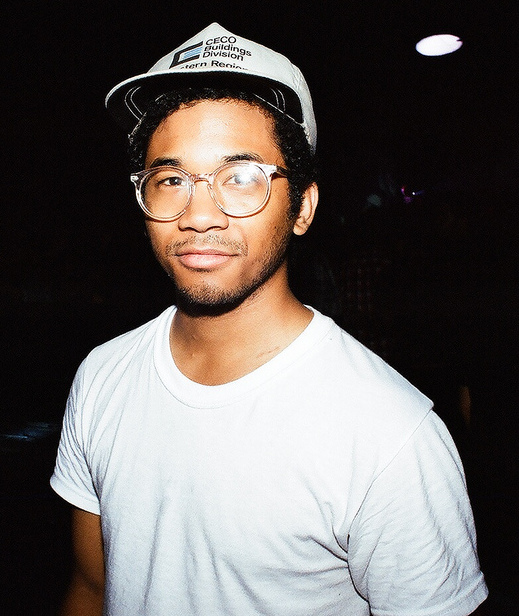
- Toro y Moi in 2010

Background information
- Also known as: Les Sins; PLUM
- Born: Chazwick Bradley Bundick; November 7, 1986 (age 40); Columbia, South Carolina, U.S.
- Origin: Oakland, California, U.S.
- Genres: Chillwave; synth-pop; indie rock; R&B; house; psychedelia; ambient; hip-hop; techno
- Occupations: Singer; songwriter; record producer; DJ; graphic designer
- Years active: 2008–present
- Labels: Dead Oceans; Carpark; Mistletone
- Website: toroymoi.com

Chaz Bear (born Chazwick Bradley Bundick; November 7, 1986), known professionally as Toro y Moi, is an American singer, songwriter, record producer, and graphic designer. He is regarded as a pioneer of the chillwave genre that emerged in the late 2000s and early 2010s, alongside artists such as Washed Out and Neon Indian, though his music has since incorporated a wide range of styles. His stage name is a multilingual phrase combining the Spanish words "toro y" ("bull and") and the French word moi ("me").

== Early life ==
Chaz Bear was born on November 7, 1986, in Columbia, South Carolina, to a Filipino mother and an African-American father. He attended Ridge View High School, where he formed the indie rock band the Heist and the Accomplice with three schoolmates.

Bear graduated from the University of South Carolina in spring of 2009 with a bachelor's degree in graphic design. Late in his school career, Toro y Moi formed a close musical relationship with fellow chillwave artist Ernest Greene, who performs under the name Washed Out.

== Career ==
=== 2010: Causers of This ===
In mid-2009, Bear was signed to Carpark Records, on which he released his debut Toro y Moi full-length album, Causers of This, in January 2010. On Causers of This, Bear experimented with sampling and production techniques using the digital audio workstation Reason. The album garnered comparisons to the "chillwave" subgenre; however, Bear stated that he never classified his music as such. Bear refers to the album's subject matter as "personal," calling it a "break-up album." Tours supporting Ruby Suns, Caribou, and Phoenix followed the album's release.

=== 2011: Underneath the Pine and Freaking Out EP ===
Bear's second album, Underneath the Pine, was released on February 22, 2011. The album was recorded at Bear's home between tours while supporting Causers of This. Underneath the Pine marked a stylistic departure from the previous album in that it was made up of all live instrumentation and contained no samples. Bear cites horror movie soundtracks, space disco, and film composers Piero Umiliani and François de Roubaix as inspiration for the album's sound. Further, Bear states that "...what influenced Underneath the Pine was finding stuff that I wanted to sample for Causers. A lot of the things I sampled for Causers ended up being the main musical inspiration for Underneath the Pine."

In an interview with the website at the Sinema, he suggested that he had moved beyond the chillwave genre: "All that stuff is really good music, like Ernest Green (Washed Out) and Neon Indian. I'm a big fan of all of that, but I think [chillwave] was just a small little period where we all were, coincidentally."

On September 13, 2011, Toro y Moi released an EP titled Freaking Out, featuring a cover of "Saturday Love" by Cherrelle and Alexander O'Neal. The EP's sound was heavily influenced by 80's Boogie and R&B.

The band was chosen by Caribou to perform at the ATP Nightmare Before Christmas festival that they co-curated in December 2011 in Minehead, England. Bear also planned a collaboration album with California rapper, Tyler, the Creator, which was recorded between late 2011 and mid 2012. Odd Future posted an unfinished collaboration leaked on SoundCloud titled "Hey You" to their Tumblr blog on July 18, 2012. The album has been scrapped since.

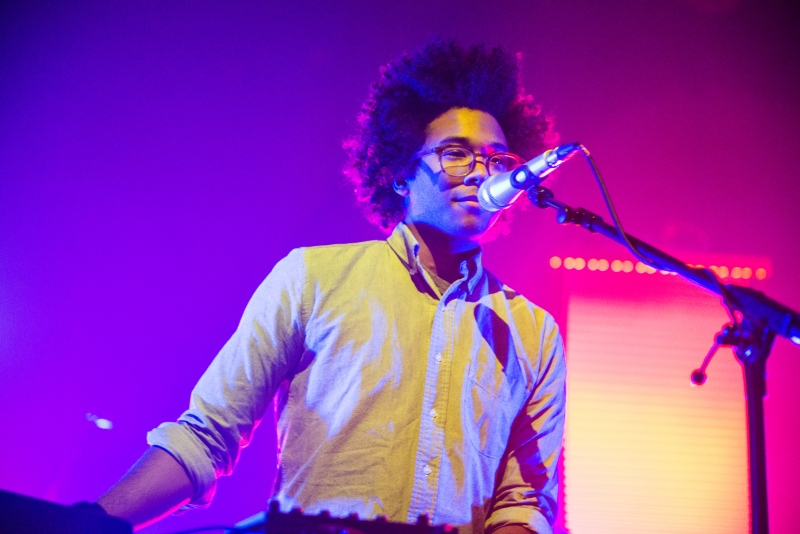
Toro y Moi performing at Koko in Camden Town in 2013

=== 2012–2013: Anything in Return ===
In January 2013, Bear released his third Toro y Moi studio album, Anything in Return, which he described as having a '90s dance and R&B sound. According to him, the album was "influenced by lots of different types of house, from deep house to two-step [...] The chords ['Harm in Change' and 'Say That'] use—that's just something I've been a fan of for a while. I really wanted to mess around with those kinds of elements and revisit what I did on Causers of This, but make those elements a little bit better and more apparent." The album was called "highly indebted to the late sacrosanct hip-hop producer J Dilla" by the San Francisco Bay Guardian. Bear stated that he wanted to combine the electronic production of his first record with the elements of traditional instrumentation of his second album.

=== 2014–2015: What For? and Samantha mixtape ===
Bear released What For?, his fourth studio album as Toro y Moi, on April 7, 2015, on Carpark Records. The album marked a further departure in sound from previous releases with a guitar-based rock sound, drawing inspiration from artists such as Big Star, Talking Heads, Todd Rundgren, Tim Maia, and Cortex. He also worked with Tyler, the Creator. Later that year, Bear released the hip-hop–influenced mixtape Samantha via a Dropbox link. The free, 20-track mixtape features collaborations with Washed Out, Rome Fortune and Nosaj Thing, among others.

=== 2016–2017: Live from Trona and Boo Boo ===
In April 2016, Bear traveled with his touring band to the Mojave Desert to film a live concert film and album. The concert, which had no audience, was filmed in a single day among the Trona Pinnacles. The band added Bay Area multi-instrumentalist Brijean Murphy on congas, and were joined by The Mattson 2 to play the song "JBS". Bear shared with The Fader that the film was inspired by Pink Floyd's Live at Pompeii, which featured a live performance without an audience.

The film, directed by Harry Israelson, premiered online in August 2016. The live recording was released as a double LP by Carpark Records in August as well.

The studio album follow up to What For?, Boo Boo, was released on July 7, 2017, by Carpark Records. In creating Boo Boo, Bear was influenced by an eclectic mix of Daft Punk, Frank Ocean, Travis Scott, and Oneohtrix Point Never. Boo Boo moved back towards a more R&B, electronic sound, diverging from the live instrumentation of What For?.

=== 2018–2021: Outer Peace and Soul Trash mixtape ===
Bear released the sixth Toro y Moi album, Outer Peace, on January 18, 2019, on Carpark Records. Outer Peace is arguably the most pop-influenced Toro y Moi album to date. Tracks like "Ordinary Pleasure" and "Freelance" showcase the continued funk, disco, and house influence that is woven through the entire Toro y Moi discography. On First Listen with NPR in January 2019, Bear explained a bit about the album title, stating that "usually the peace is within, so to have peace on the outside is the challenge. I kind of just wanted to call that out."

A week after the release of Outer Peace and while on tour supporting the album, Bear shared a Dropbox link to a cassette bounce of his mixtape, Soul Trash. In October 2019, an updated version of Soul Trash was released on streaming platforms. The official release was accompanied by a psychedelic short film directed by Bay Area artist Laneya Billingsley.

In late 2019, Bear started working with Flume on the drum and bass-inspired track "The Difference", which was released on March 11, 2020. The song was nominated for a Grammy Award for Best Dance Recording for 2020.

In October 2021, Bear announced that he had signed with Dead Oceans to release the next Toro y Moi album in progress.

=== 2022–present: Mahal and Hole Erth ===
On January 26, 2022, Bear announced his seventh studio album as Toro y Moi, Mahal, alongside the release of its first two singles, "Postman" and "Magazine". Two more singles "The Loop" and "Déjà Vu" were released on February 22 and March 31 that year, respectively. The album was released on April 29 via Dead Oceans.

He announced his next album Hole Erth on June 12, 2024, alongside the first single, "Tuesday". The album took a new stylistic approach compared to his previous work, incorporating elements of emo rap and choral music, and inviting a number of collaborators, including Don Toliver, Porches, Kevin Abstract and Benjamin Gibbard. The album was released on September 6, 2024.

== Side projects ==
=== Les Sins (2014–present) ===
Bear also DJs and makes electronic dance music under the moniker Les Sins. As Les Sins, he has released a series of 12-inch records on Carpark Records and Jiaolong Records. Bear stated that Les Sins "was just another way to make weirder music without having to feel I'm alienating Toro y Moi [fans]. So it's kind of nice to do whatever kind of song I want to do without having to worry about it being accessible." Les Sins's debut album, Michael, was released on November 4, 2014, through Bear's own label, Company Records (now Company Studio). in 2020, Les Sins released the split EP C'mon Les' Go with New York house producer AceMo through Company Records.

=== PLUM (2016–present) ===
Bear also produces and performs ambient music under the name PLUM. The first PLUM release, a self-titled single-track tape, was issued through Leaving Records on September 28, 2016. PLUM's following album, StreetView, was released through Company Studio on October 24, 2020. The album's release was accompanied by the launch of an immersive website, plum.link, which paired streams of the album with drone footage and visual effects designed to enhance the listening experience.

=== Chaz Bundick Meets the Mattson 2 (2016–2017) ===
Bear released a collaborative album, Star Stuff, with The Mattson 2, a jazz duo from California. The album was released on March 31, 2017, through Company Records and reached No. 1 on the contemporary jazz Billboard Charts. While touring as a supporting artist for Star Stuff, Bear and the Mattson 2 performed their collaborative album alongside existing songs from Bear's catalog as Toro y Moi's.

== Art and design work ==
Alongside his music career, Bear also maintains a visual art and design practice. In 2016, Bear founded Company Studio as a framework and vehicle for his visual endeavors. Company Studio works across various disciplines including graphic design, art direction, fine art, murals and installations, event production, and video production. Company studio is located in Oakland California and as of 2025, hosts open studio sessions on select days.

Bear's fine art is primarily centered around painting, but also includes drawing, collage, sculpture, and most recently photography. Bear has had solo shows in at New Image Art (Los Angeles), FISK Projects (Portland), and Gallery Commune (Tokyo).

Company Studio is also the name of Bear's record label, an imprint under Carpark Records, on which he releases his own side projects as well as records by selected artists that he has produced.

== Band members ==
=== Live ===
- Chaz Bear – vocals, guitar, and keyboards (2008–present)
- Imari Mubarak – bass (present)
- Andy Woodward – drums (2010–2025)
- Anthony Ferraro – keyboards and backing vocals (2013–2025)

== Personal life ==
Bear lives and works in the San Francisco Bay Area, where he moved after leaving South Carolina. On June 27, 2017, the city of Berkeley, California officially declared June 27 to be 'Chaz Bundick Day'. This public recognition of Bear's contribution to music and the arts was presented by Jesse Arreguín, Mayor of Berkeley.

== Discography ==
=== Studio albums ===
Title	Album details	Peak chart positions
Title	Album details	US
Causers of This	Released: January 4, 2010; Label: Carpark; Format: CD, DL, LP	—
Underneath the Pine	Released: February 22, 2011; Label: Carpark; Format: CD, DL, LP	186
Anything in Return	Released: January 22, 2013; Label: Carpark; Format: CD, DL, LP	60
Michael (as Les Sins)	Released: November 4, 2014; Label: Company; Format: CD, DL, LP	—
What For?	Released: April 7, 2015; Label: Carpark; Format: CD, DL, LP	123
Star Stuff (with the Mattson 2, as Chaz Bundick Meets the Mattson 2)	Released: March 31, 2017; Label: Company; Format: CD, DL, LP	—
Boo Boo	Released: July 7, 2017; Label: Carpark; Format: CD, DL, LP	136
Outer Peace	Released: January 18, 2019; Label: Carpark; Format: CD, DL, LP	114
Mahal	Released: April 29, 2022; Label: Dead Oceans; Format: CD, DL, LP, MC	167
Hole Erth	Released: September 6, 2024; Label: Dead Oceans; Format: CD, DL, LP	—
Unusua	Released: November 20, 2026; Label: Company Studio; Format: DL	—

=== Compilation albums ===
Title	Album details
June 2009	Released: April 24, 2012; Label: Carpark

=== Mixtapes ===
- Guest Mix for Andrew Meza's BTS Radio (2012)
- Boiler Room Los Angeles Mix (2012)
- Samantha (2015)
- Soul Trash (2019)

=== Live albums ===
- Live from Trona (2016)
- Mahal (Live from Big Sur) (2023)
- Live at The Fillmore Miami (with Khruangbin) (2023)
- Unerthed: Hole Erth Unplugged (2025)

=== EPs ===
- Body Angles (2009)
- Sides of Chaz (2010)
- Freaking Out (2011)
- Toro y Rome Vol. 1 (with Rome Fortune) (2018)
- Smartbeats (for Glaceau Smartwater) (2019)
- C'mon Les' Go (as Les Sins; split with AceMo) (2020)
- Sandhills (2023)

=== Singles ===
Title	Year	Album
"Left Alone At Night"	2009	Non-album single
"Blessa"	2009	Causers of This
"Leave Everywhere"	2010	Non-album single
"Still Sound"	2010	Underneath the Pine
"New Beat"	2011	Underneath the Pine
"I Will Talk to You" / "For No Reason" (split 7-inch with Cloud Nothings)	2011	Non-album single
"So Many Details"	2012	Anything in Return
"Say That"	2013	Anything in Return
"Lyin (Pt. 1-4)" / "Would Be" (split 7-inch with Dog Bite)	2013	Non-album singles
"Campo"	2013	Non-album singles
"Empty Nesters"	2015	What For?
"Buffalo"	2015	What For?
"Girl Like You"	2017	Boo Boo
"You and I"	2017	Boo Boo
"Omaha"	2017	Non-album single
"Freelance"	2018	Outer Peace
"Ordinary Pleasure"	2018	Outer Peace
"Way Too Hot" / "Drip"	2018	Non-album singles
"The Difference" (with Flume)	2020	Non-album singles
"Ordinary Guy" (featuring The Mattson 2) (Joe Bataan cover)	2020	Non-album singles
"Postman" / "Magazine"	2022	Mahal
"The Loop"	2022	Mahal
"Déjà Vu"	2022	Mahal
"Genius of Love" (featuring Brijean) (Tom Tom Club cover)	2024	Everyone's Getting Involved: A Tribute to Talking Heads' Stop Making Sense
"Tuesday"	2024	Hole Erth
"Heaven" (featuring Kevin Abstract and Lev)	2024	Hole Erth
"Hollywood" (featuring Ben Gibbard) / "CD-R"	2024	Hole Erth
"Daria" (featuring Kenny Beats)	2025	Non-album single
"Stars and Sons" (Broken Social Scene cover)	2025	Anthems: A Celebration of Broken Social Scene's You Forgot It in People
"CD-R (Unerthed)"	2025	Unerthed: Hole Erth Unplugged
"Proof"	2026	Unusua
"Motive"	2026	Unusua

=== Demo albums ===
- Woodlands (2007)
- My Touch (2009)

=== As producer ===
- "Fettucini" from Not O.K. by Kool A.D. (2014)
- "Tight" and "The Front" from Word O.K. by Kool A.D. (2014)
- "HiiiJack" by SZA from Z (2014)
- Sunday Dinner by Keath Mead (2015)
- Signals EP by Madeline Kenney (2016)
- Radiolove EP by Tanukichan (2016)
- "Long Days" from VVORLDWIDE PIMPSATION by Rome Fortune (2016)
- "Luv N Haight" from Peyote Karaoke by Kool A.D. (2016)
- Night Night at the First Landing by Madeline Kenney (2017)
- Sundays by Tanukichan (2018)
- Living in Symbol by Astronauts, etc. (2018)
- Rhododendron by Valley Maker (2018)
- "Dark Place" from No Pressure by Logic (2020)
- "MVP", "Where Does The Party Go?", "Dominoes", "Prickling Skin", "Anna Jetson", "A Month of Mondays" and "Giants" from Sunshine Factory by Uffie (2022)
- GIZMO by Tanukichan (2023)

=== As featured artist ===
Title	Primary artist(s)	Year	Album
"Try"	Nosaj Thing	2013	Home
"Chaz Interlude"	Travis Scott	2013	Owl Pharaoh
"Come Alive"	Chromeo	2014	White Women
"The Front"	Kool A.D.	2014	Word O.K.
"Flying High"	Travis Scott	2015	Rodeo
"Run" (as Chaz Bundick)	Tyler, the Creator	2015	Cherry Bomb
"Fucking Young / Perfect" (as Chaz Bundick)	Tyler, the Creator	2015	Cherry Bomb
"If I Was a Folkstar"	The Avalanches	2016	Wildflower
"Trouble"	Kool A.D.	2016	Peyote Karaoke
"9 Carrots"	Flying Lotus	2019	Flamagra
"Dark and Handsome"	Blood Orange	2019	Angel's Pulse
"Money Up"	MadeinTYO	2020	Never Forgotten
"Tape"	Starchild & the New Romantic	2020	Forever
"A Moment Of Mystery"	FKJ	2022	Vincent
"Condition"	Nosaj Thing	2022	Continua
"Cinderella"	Don Toliver	2023	Love Sick
"Days Go By"	SBTRKT	2023	The Rat Road
"Demons"	SBTRKT	2023	The Rat Road
"Slip"	Kenny Mason	2024	9
"All Ur Luv"	Wavedash & Madeon	2024	Tempo
"ASPEN"	Channel Tres	2024	Head Rush
"Body High"	Rich Brian	2025	Where Is My Head?
"Images"	Aminé	2025	13 Months of Sunshine
"Sunrise"	Ampersounds	2025	Generations
"CURIOUS"	Sam Gellaitry	2025	Anywhere Here Is Perfect

=== Remixes ===
Title	Year	Artist(s)
"Feel It All Around"	2009	Washed Out
"Repeated"	2009	The Longcut
"At a Glance"	2010	Body Language
"Alligator"	2010	Tegan and Sara
"Fire Escape"	2010	Fanfarlo
"Deadbeat Summer"	2010	Neon Indian
"French!"	2011	Tyler, The Creator featuring Hodgy Beats
"Blink and You'll Miss a Revolution"	2011	Cut Copy
"You & Me"	2013	Disclosure featuring Eliza Doolittle
"My Man"	2013	Billie Holiday
"U G" (as Les Sins)	2018	Nosaj Thing
"Bombs Away"	2019	Charlotte Gainsbourg
"Hit Me Where It Hurts"	2020	Caroline Polachek
"3 AM"	2020	HAIM
"Home"	2021	Caribou

=== Music videos ===
- "Blessa" (2009)
- "Talamak" (2010)
- "Low Shoulders" (2010)
- "Still Sound" (2011)
- "New Beat" (2011)
- "How I Know" (2011)
- "So Many Details" (2012)
- "Say That" (2013)
- "Never Matter" (2013)
- "Rose Quartz" (2013)
- "Empty Nesters" (2015)
- "Half Dome" (2015)
- "Lilly" (2015)
- "Girl Like You" (2017)
- "You and I" (2017)
- "Windows" (2017)
- "Pavement" (2017)
- "No Show" (2017)
- "Omaha" (2017)
- "Freelance" (2018)
- "Ordinary Pleasure" (2019)
- "50-50" (2019)
- "drip bounce _7_24_18" (2019)
- "New House" (2019)
- "Magazine" (2022)
- "Postman" (2022)
- "The Loop" (2022)
- "Déjá Vu" (2022)
- "Millennium" (2022)
- "Back Then" (2023)
- "Sidelines" (2023)
- "Sandhills" (2023)
- "The View" (2023)
- "Said Goodbye to Rock n Roll" (2023)
- "Tuesday" (2024)
- "Heaven" (2024)
- "Madonna" (2024)
- "Babydaddy" (2024)
- "Walking In The Rain" (2024)
