= Change! =

Studio album by The Black Swans
- Released: November 6, 2007
- Genre: Folk rock
- Label: La Société Expéditionnaire
- Producer: Jerry DeCicca

The Black Swans chronology
Sex Brain (2006)	Change! (2007)	Words Are Stupid (2010)

Professional ratings
Review scores
Source	Rating
Pitchfork Media	(7.9/10)
Stylus	A

Change! is the second full-length album by the Black Swans. It is a follow-up to 2004's Who Will Walk in the Darkness with You? and their 2006 EP, Sex Brain. Harp Magazine described the album as a tip of the hat to Charles Simic, the Left Banke, and Fred Neil.

== Cover ==
The cover of the CD release is a painting, "Untitled", by Debbie Porchetti, a member of Arc Industries North Workshop, a branch of Franklin County Board of MRDD. The workshop provides services to 300 adults with developmental challenges and recognize their talents by offering an environment that reinforces their confidence and self-expression. Change! was also released in a limited edition vinyl featuring original, one of a kind artwork by workshop members who applied their expression to 500 blank album sleeves.

== Track listing ==
All tracks are written by Jerry DeCicca, except "Blue Moon #9" by DeCicca, Faulkner & Forbes.

No.	Title	Length
1.	"New Face"	2:37
2.	"Hope Island"	4:52
3.	"Coats"	3:55
4.	"Only Be with You"	4:35
5.	"Shake"	6:21
6.	"Purple Heart"	2:28
7.	"Fruitless Ways"	3:57
8.	"Blue Moon #9"	2:33
9.	"3 Broken Words"	3:48
10.	"Slide on Down"	3:46
11.	"Change!"	3:35
12.	"3 Chord Song"	5:55

== Personnel ==
=== Musicians ===
- Jerry DeCicca - acoustic guitar, vocals, electric guitar on "Purple Heart"
- Noel Sayre - violin, viola
- Canaan Faulkner - bass, backing vocals
- Chris Forbes - electric guitar, tenor guitar, backing vocals
- Keith Hanlon drums, percussion
- Amy Alwood - backing vocals
- Joe Peppercorn - piano

== Releases ==
year	format	label	catalog #
2007	CD	La Société Expéditionnaire	7
