= A Constant Sea =

2013 studio album by Heliotropes

Studio album by Heliotropes
- Released: June 18, 2013 (Digital download); May 20, 2014 (LP release)
- Recorded: 2012–2013
- Genres: Psychedelic rock; stoner rock; heavy metal; blues rock; indie rock; grunge
- Labels: Manimal Vinyl; Goodnight Records
- Producer: Jeff Berner

Singles from A Constant Sea
- 1. "Ribbons" Released: 2011; 2. "Moonlite" Released: 29 May 2012; 3. "The Dove" Released: 11 September 2012

A Constant Sea is the only album by American psychedelic/alternative rock band Heliotropes. It was released 18 June 2013 on Manimal Vinyl. Its musical sound ranges across heavy rock styles. The album follows on from various singles that they released and their tour with Esben and the Witch.

== Background and recording ==
Heliotropes formed in 2009 by Jessica Numsuwankijkul and Amber Myers when Numsuwankijkul posted an advert on Craigslist, initially trying to find musicians to perform Brian Eno-style music, but they found this too hard. They played a show with Astrid Pierce and one of the members, Cici Harrison, eventually joined the band a year later. On the subject, Numsuwankijkul said "I remember being like, “Oh, we wish she was in our band" and then a year later, she was." Nya Abudu answered the advert on Cragslist and the line-up was complete. They began to form their sound, instead of playing Eno-style songs.

The band signed to Manimal Vinyl in 2012 and released various single, three of which would appear on their first album. The album was recorded between 2012 and 2013. The title of the album comes from a song originally titled "A Constant Sea", but they didn't have enough time to record it.

== Composition ==
A Constant Sea explores significantly psychedelic territory musically, working in psychedelic rock and stoner metal / rock. The songs hold footing in a mix of 1960s blues rock and early heavy metal.

Heliotropes were credited with crafting "some of the heaviest indie rock available" with the album. Sea also has grunge sounds reminiscent of the 1990s. Metallic sludge features as well, possibly implying a mix of the genres metallic hardcore and sludge metal.

Jessica Numsuwankijkul's singing sees her don a "witchy timbre" and "yowl" like Hole's Courtney Love era Live Through This.

== Packaging ==
The album cover features artwork by Nor Ashraf, a Malaysian artist that the band met over the internet. Numsuwankijkul said that once she'd seen it she thought that it would always be the album cover. She also said she sees it as a follow up to the "Ribbons" cover, taken by Koen Jacobs of a Ram who had just finished drinking some water.

== Release ==
After the recording, they went on their first US tour with Esben and the Witch. The band released a new song titled "Psalms" as a free download on the Rolling Stone website. They later on announced their song "Quatto". Both tracks were to be released on the band's debut album, A Constant Sea. A Constant Sea was released on 18 June 2013 on Manimal Vinyl as a digital download, but limited vinyl versions are to come soon.

In May 2014, Goodnight Records released the LP version of the album, complete with new artwork and the unreleased title track.

== Critical reception ==
Professional ratings
Aggregate scores
Source	Rating
AnyDecentMusic?	6.9/10
Metacritic	70/100
Review scores
Source	Rating
AllMusic	3.5/5 stars
Blurt	3/5 stars
Consequence	B
Paste	8.0/10
PopMatters	6/10
Spin	8/10
Tiny Mix Tapes	3/5 marks

A Constant Sea was welcomed with generally positive reviews upon release. On Metacritic, it holds a score of 70 out of 100, indicating "generally favorable reviews", based on six reviews.

Spin Magazine gave the album an 8/10 rating. Bowlegs Music made the album their record of the day saying that "A Constant Sea isn’t the sound of a band that met both only four years ago and in a completely different musical guise. It sounds like a group of long-time friends playing the music that they love, and playing it very well," giving it 8.4 and Allmusic said "Those who make it through the assault of riffs and overall detached feel of much of the record will be treated to obscured gems like "Christine," a near-perfect album closer that revisits moonlit '50s balladry through a Mazzy Star lens."

== Track listing ==
No.	Title	Length
1.	"Early in the Morning"	4:07
2.	"Psalms"	4:12
3.	"Everyone Else"	3:01
4.	"Moonlite"	4:16
5.	"Good and Evil"	3:54
6.	"Ribbons"	4:23
7.	"Quatto"	4:56
8.	"The Dove"	4:46
9.	"I Walk Upon the Water"	4:22
10.	"Unadorned"	3:20
11.	"Awake"	4:24
12.	"Christine"	4:01

2014 LP release
No.	Title	Length
1.	"Early in the Morning"	4:07
2.	"Psalms"	4:12
3.	"Everyone Else"	3:01
4.	"Good and Evil"	3:54
5.	"Ribbons"	4:23
6.	"Quatto"	4:57
7.	"Awake"	4:24
8.	"Christine"	4:04
9.	"A Constant Sea"	5:11

== Personnel ==
Credits adapted from the 2014 LP's Bandcamp page.

Heliotropes

- Jessica Numsuwankijkul – vocals, guitar, mandolin, piano
- Amber Myers – tambourine, vocals
- Nya Abudu – bass
- Cici Harrison – drums

Additional musicians

- Julia Tepper - violin on "A Constant Sea"
- John Stanesco - bass clarinet on "A Constant Sea"
- Matthew Flory Meade - Rhodes on "Christine"

Technical

- Jeff Berner – producer, engineering, mixing, harmonium on "Quatto", slide guitar on "Unadorned"
