= Twerp Verse =

Studio album by Speedy Ortiz
- Released: April 27, 2018
- Studios: Gravesend Recordings, Silent Barn
- Genre: Indie rock
- Length: 35:27
- Label: Carpark

Speedy Ortiz chronology
| Foil Deer (2015) | Twerp Verse (2018) | Rabbit Rabbit (2023) |

Professional ratings
Aggregate scores
| Source | Rating |
|---|---|
| AnyDecentMusic? | 7.3/10 |
| Metacritic | 79/100 |
Review scores
| Source | Rating |
| The 405 | 7/10 |
| AllMusic | 4/5 stars |
| Crack Magazine | 7/10 |
| DIY | 4/5 stars |
| Exclaim! | 7/10 |
| The Line of Best Fit | 7.5/10 |
| MusicOMH | 4/5 stars |
| Paste | 7.8/10 |
| Pitchfork | 7.4/10 |
| The Skinny | 3/5 stars |

Twerp Verse is the third studio album by American indie rock band Speedy Ortiz. It was released on April 27, 2018 under Carpark Records.

== Release ==
On February 21, 2018, the band announced the release of their new album, along with their first single "Lucky 88". The music video was released the same day, and was directed and produced by Emily Yoshida.

The second single "Lean In When I Suffer" was released on March 23, 2018. The music video, directed by Ari Ratner, features the band in a "happiness bootcamp" to show the pressures of depression.

The third single "Villain" was released on April 11, 2018.

== Critical reception ==
Twerp Verse was met with "generally favorable" reviews from critics. At Metacritic, which assigns a weighted average rating out of 100 to reviews from mainstream publications, this release received an average score of 79, based on 19 reviews. Aggregator Album of the Year gave the release a 75 out of 100 based on a critical consensus of 23 reviews.

Brody Kenny of The 405 said the release "is Speedy Ortiz’s poppiest album yet, with plenty of synths, hooks, and an overall brighter sheen." Heather Phares of AllMusic explained: "It's easily the band's most direct album, but rather than dumbing things down, they've removed anything that might get in the way of their messages. The more defiant they are, the more accessible they get, and they kick off the album with some of their hookiest songs." Ian Rodgers from Exclaim! explained the album as "a solid entry that should please fans of Speedy Ortiz and might also gain them some new ones with its hints of pop. The guitars are in punk-grunge tuning, but there are recognizable hooks. The album deftly combines fantasy aspects with a real darkness in its lyrics."

== Track listing ==
Twerp Verse track listing
| No. | Title | Length |
|---|---|---|
| 1. | "Buck Me Off" | 2:59 |
| 2. | "Lean in When I Suffer" | 2:30 |
| 3. | "Lucky 88" | 3:10 |
| 4. | "Can I Kiss You?" | 2:26 |
| 5. | "Backslidin'" | 2:59 |
| 6. | "Villain" | 3:19 |
| 7. | "I'm Blessed" | 4:25 |
| 8. | "Sport Death" | 3:29 |
| 9. | "Alone With the Girls" | 3:23 |
| 10. | "Moving In" | 4:34 |
| 11. | "You Hate the Title" | 2:16 |

Japanese Special Edition
| No. | Title | Length |
|---|---|---|
| 12. | "I Like The Title" | 3:00 |
| 13. | "Tetraphobia" | 2:42 |

== Personnel ==
Musicians

- Sadie Dupuis – guitar, synth, vocals
- Michael Falcone – drums, vocals
- Darl Ferm – bass
- Andy Molholt – guitar
- Danny Seim - synth

Production

- Diane Dupuis – artwork
- Sadie Dupuis - engineer, artwork
- Carlos Hernandez – engineer
- Emily Lazar – mastering
- Mike Mogis – producer, mixing
- Julian Fader – engineer

== Charts ==
Chart performance for Twerp Verse
| Chart (2018) | Peak position |
|---|---|
| US Independent Albums (Billboard) | 36 |
| US Heatseekers Albums (Billboard) | 6 |
