= Lewis & Clarke =

Pen name of singer, songwriter, and multi-instrumentalist Lou Rogai

Lewis & Clarke Lou Rogai
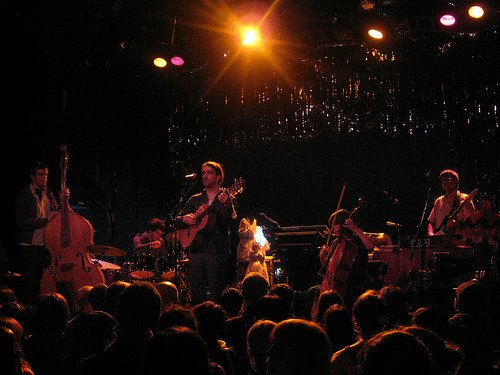

Background information
- Origin: Delaware Water Gap, Pennsylvania, United States
- Genres: Art pop; post-rock; indie folk
- Occupations: Songwriter; composer; singer; multi-instrumentalist
- Years active: 2003–present
- Labels: La Société Expéditionnaire, Manimal Vinyl
- Website: lewisandclarkemusic.com; www.lourogai.com

Lewis & Clarke is the pen name of American musician, singer, songwriter, record producer, and composer Lou Rogai. The name references the fellowship and correspondence between C. S. Lewis and Arthur C. Clarke, not the 19th-century explorers. Lewis & Clarke has released three studio albums, Bare Bones and Branches, Blasts of Holy Birth, and Triumvirate, as well as several singles and EPs. The moniker is also a metaphor for journey on many levels and the music has been described as art-pop or avant-folk. Rogai is the founder of La Société Expéditionnaire, a record label dedicated to creating "beautiful sounding records and tangible musical artifacts".

== History ==
=== 2003–2005 Bright Light and Bare Bones and Branches ===
The 7" single and CD/EP Bright Light was released in 2003 on Sun.Sea.Sky (US) and Delboy Records (EU). MAGNET Magazine's review of the EP introduced Rogai as "a gifted newcomer".

Lewis & Clarke's debut full length, Bare Bones and Branches, was released in 2003 by Delboy Records (Belgium). This was supported by a DIY tour of the US and a press tour of the Benelux which included 10 live shows. A live track surfaced on a compilation issued by PIAS entitled Duyster (a compilation from Belgian National Radio's program of the same name).

The US version of Bare Bones and Branches was released in 2005 on the Summersteps imprint, containing alternate takes, mixes, tracks and artwork. The LP was called "The perfect Autumnal album" by the Associated Press, while No Depression cited "A whisper of an album, lovely without being precious, moody without being beleaguering." Lewis & Clarke appeared on the Summersteps compilation Down in a Mirror: A Second Tribute to Jandek, with a cover of "Nancy Sings". Jandek expressed his approval of the track in a handwritten letter to the label.

=== 2006–2008 Live on WPRB and Blasts of Holy Birth ===
In 2006 Live on WPRB was released on the fledgling La Société Expéditionnaire as a vinyl-only 12" EP. The recording bridged the gap from past material with the forthcoming Blasts of Holy Birth and incorporated chimes, vocals, eastern drones, harp, guitar, banjo, piano, percussion, and the voice of Rogai's infant son.

Released in May 2007, Blasts of Holy Birth dovetails the symbolic nature of spring and birth, and represents themes found in a Taoist text called Secret of the Golden Flower (also the title of the opening track). Pitchfork called the record "Eight tracks of delicate Beauty" described as "an idealized environment that's unplugged, untouched, and unspoiled." and The Onion's A/V Club noted: "Rogai finally puts the lame-ass freak-folk label to rest by making an album that's as grounded in real life as it is sublimated in ether....Rogai has a gift for speaking plainly while tonguing poetry, and his meditations on life cycles and pastoral philosophy blossom and collapse with organic grace." Later in 2007, Lewis & Clarke toured as a duo with cellist Eve Miller, supporting Bat For Lashes (UK), and closed out the year with a performance at MoMA NYC.

Lewis & Clarke toured as a 5-piece band in the spring of 2008. Later in the year Rogai covered "Disintegration" by The Cure for the Manimal Vinyl tribute compilation Perfect as Cats: A Tribute to The Cure.

=== 2009–2010 Light Time EP ===
In 2009 Rogai released a second EP, Light Time, and supported Bat For Lashes on select tour dates once again. A second tour in 2009 was with Caroline Weeks. PopMatters said of Light Time: "Lewis & Clarke doesn't play songs as much as unfurl them, slowly letting ribbons of sound billow and cascade. The power, though, is palpable, made even stronger through delicateness, a paradox that is at play not only in the music on Light Time but also in its metaphors for life, loss and renewal."

In 2010 Lewis & Clarke recorded a cover version of "Changes" for the charity compilation We Were So Turned On: A Tribute to David Bowie. Live appearances included the Truck America Festival in Big Indian, NY.

=== 2014–2015 Triumvirate ===
After almost a four-year hiatus, Rogai released a seventy-five minute album called Triumvirate in October 2014. The album announcement was accompanied by the 12 minute short film A Map of a Maze, "detailing the environments, abstractions, and meditations of Triumvirate". The double-vinyl LP pressing was funded through a successful Kickstarter campaign that re-connected Rogai with his earliest supporters and new fans alike. The Line Of Best Fit (UK) called the album "Gorgeously crafted and composed, full of wonder...seventy-five minutes of sheer beauty and trauma."

Also released in October 2014 was Rogai's cover version of "The Seventh Stranger" for the charity compilation Making Patterns Rhyme – A Tribute to Duran Duran.

In November 2014 the music documentary series Shaking Through featured Lewis & Clarke's single "The Silver Sea" and detailed Rogai's hiatus and family life. The episode was curated by Strand of Oaks' Tim Showalter who also contributed vocals to the song.

The Castle Inn Sessions features live footage of Rogai with his band performing selections from Triumvirate. The sessions took place in January 2015 at The Castle Inn, a former grand hotel in Delaware Water Gap, PA .

=== 2017–present ===
Recording as the duo Cedar Sparks, in 2017 Lou Rogai teamed up with Railroad Earth's Tim Carbone to adapt a passage of James Joyce's Finnegans Wake for the Waywords and Meansigns project. Rogai had previously engineered Carbone's solo recording for the project in 2015.

In June 2018 Rogai released a movement of instrumental music, Implications in D Major; An Adagio for Chamber Strings.

Lou Rogai composed the main instrumental score for Essere Amato, a film written and directed by Bas-Tzion Beahan. The soundtrack was released on Calabasas Records in March 2019 and features Rogai, John Taylor, David Scott Stone, and Paul Beahan.

In November 2019 Rogai released Cathedral, an experimental/neoclassical album of mainly instrumental work. All Around Sound noted it as "a beautiful and meditative piece of art that surprises and delights by virtue of its embrace and suspension of traditional form and its avant-garde approach". The piece was performed live with a twelve-piece chamber ensemble for COToA 2019.

In 2023 Cedar Sparks collaborated with Lenny Kaye on a split 7" vinyl release for Record Store Day. Gathering Song/Santa's Knee was released via La Société Expéditionnaire/MVD Entertainment Group for RSD's Black Friday.

== Discography ==
- "Bright Light" 7"/EP (2003 Delboy EU)
- Bare Bones and Branches LP (2003 Delboy EU /2005 Summersteps US)
- Live on WPRB EP (2006 La Société Expéditionnaire)
- Blasts of Holy Birth LP (2007 La Société Expéditionnaire)
- Light Time EP (2009 La Société Expéditionnaire)
- Triumvirate LP (2014 La Société Expéditionnaire)
- "The Silver Sea" Single (2014 Weathervane Music)
- "Aurora 15:34" Single (2022 La Société Expéditionnaire)

=== Compilation appearances ===
- "Doc Holiday Was a Phony" (live) – Duyster – (PIAS 2005)
- "Nancy Sings" – Down in a Mirror, A Tribute to Jandek v.2 (Summersteps 2005)
- "Disintegration" – Perfect As Cats: A Tribute to the Cure (Manimal Vinyl, 2009)
- "Changes" – We Were So Turned On: A Tribute to David Bowie (Manimal Vinyl, 2010)
- "The Seventh Stranger" – Making Patterns Rhyme – A Tribute to Duran Duran (Modern Records / Manimal Vinyl 2014)
- Selected adaptation of James Joyce's Finnegans Wake – Cedar Sparks (Lou Rogai and Tim Carbone) – (Waywords and Meansigns Opendoor Edition, 2017)
