= Sadie Dupuis =

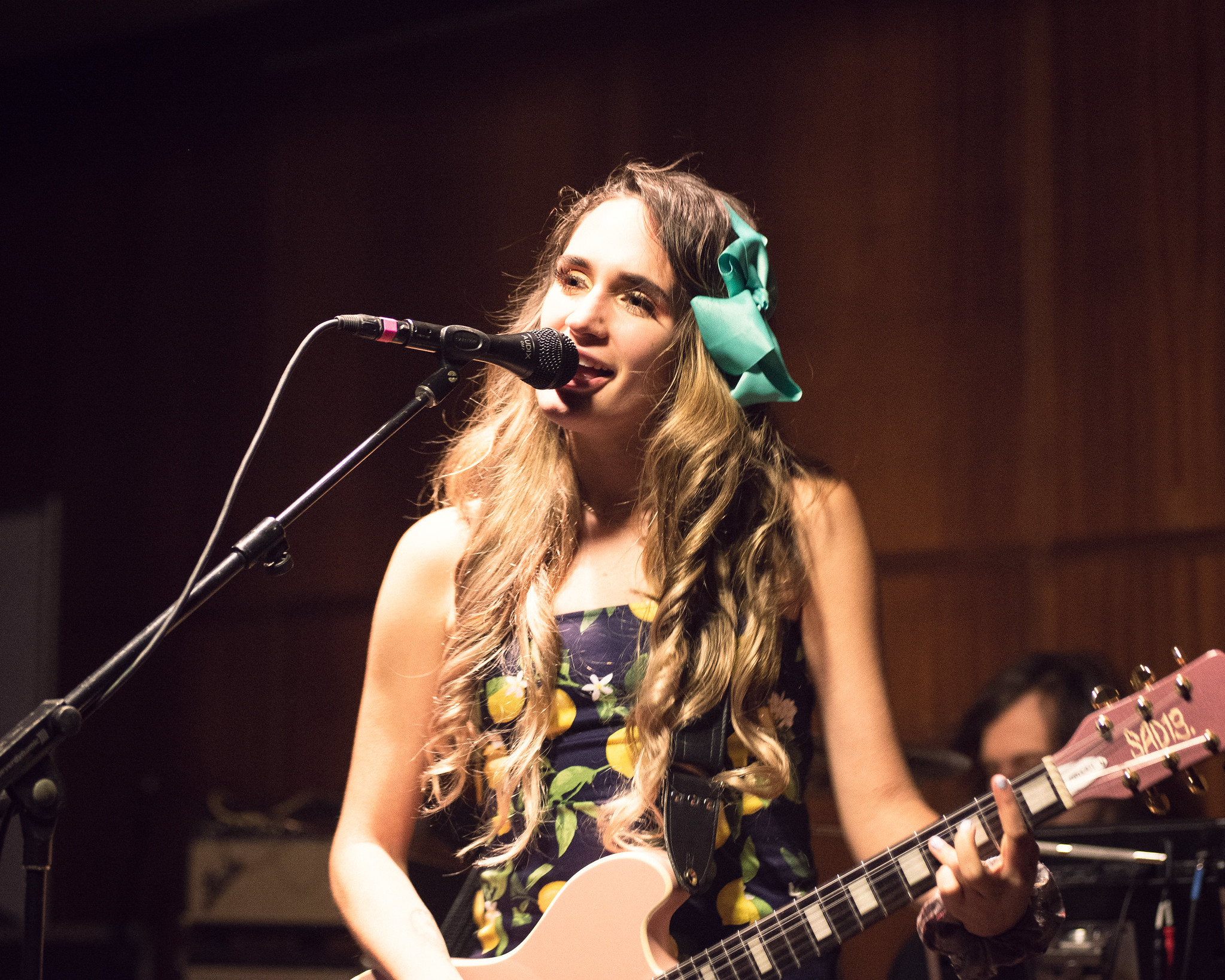
- Dupuis in 2018

Background information
- Born: Sarah Elizabeth Dupuis; July 8, 1988 (age 38)
- Genres: Indie rock
- Occupations: Musician, poet
- Instruments: Guitar; vocals
- Years active: 2011–present
- Labels: Carpark; Exploding in Sound
- Member of: Speedy Ortiz

Sarah Elizabeth "Sadie" Dupuis (born July 8, 1988) is an American musician who is the guitarist, lead vocalist and lyricist for the band Speedy Ortiz. She has also released two solo albums, Slugger and Haunted Painting, under the name Sad13. Dupuis has published two books of poetry. A portrait of her was featured on the August 22, 2022 cover of The New Yorker. In October 2023, Rolling Stone included Dupuis on its 250 Greatest Guitarists of All Time list.

== Early life and education ==
Dupuis began playing music as a child, singing in choirs and playing piano. She joined a professional choir in middle school and toured internationally with it through high school. She learned to play guitar at the age of 13. When she was 14, she spent a year studying at Kent School, a private co-educational college preparatory school in Kent, Connecticut. She is a graduate of Shepaug Valley High School in Washington, Connecticut. She is also an alumna of Buck's Rock, an educational arts camp where she was both a student and an instructor of music, which later inspired Speedy Ortiz to fundraise for Girls Rock Camp.

Dupuis attended the Massachusetts Institute of Technology (MIT) for two years. She initially pursued dual degrees in mathematics and music before becoming interested in the school newspaper and deciding to eschew mathematics in favor of writing. After leaving MIT, she completed her schooling at Barnard College with a concentration on poetry. Before becoming a full-time musician, she worked as a freelance writer, taught writing courses, and got her MFA in poetry at University of Massachusetts Amherst.

== Career ==
Dupuis began writing and releasing music in high school, first recording herself on a TASCAM Portastudio. In 2005, her song “Sixteen” briefly charted on Myspace in between Dashboard Confessional and James Blunt. She formed the band Quilty in 2006, releasing the album Clover/Coriander in 2010; The Phoenix (newspaper) described the debut as “grungy” and “‘90s-inspired.” The band split up in 2012 and Dupuis pursued Speedy Ortiz. Dupuis wrote her first Speedy Ortiz song, "Ka-Prow", while teaching songwriting at Buck's Rock in 2011. Speedy Ortiz released its first EP, Cop Kicker, in 2011. Also during 2011, Dupuis played in "the all-female Pavement cover band" Babement, formed with Cindy Lou Gooden of Very Fresh; however, they only performed a "couple shows." In 2012, Dupuis' side project Dark Warble released an EP, Moon Is Trouble. Dupuis quit her teaching job and became a full-time musician while preparing for the release of Speedy Ortiz's second album, Foil Deer.

Dupuis has featured on numerous tracks by Exploding in Sound bands Ovlov and Mister Goblin, providing backing vocals. She has also worked with a range of artists as a producer, synth player, or guitarist, including Backxwash, Ben Lee, Field Mouse (band), Tracy Bonham, Lushlife and Eric Slick. Dupuis has scored music for podcasts including Jamie Loftus’ My Year in Mensa and Ghost Church, Chris Stedman’s Unread, and the Songs in the Key of Death podcast alongside Bonnie Prince Billy. In 2023 Dupuis was a co-writer on The New Pornographers album Continue as a Guest.

In January 2016, Dupuis, under the name Sad13, worked with hip-hop artist Lizzo and recorded the song "Basement Queens". In November 2016, she released the album Slugger under the same name. Sad13 toured the US supported by artists Vagabon, Sam Evian, Lisa Prank and Stef Chura, the UK supported by Big Joanie with an appearance at Glastonbury, as well as Australia. Sad13 also toured opening for Deerhoof and Ted Leo. In September 2020, Dupuis released her second album as Sad13, Haunted Painting. While Dupuis played most of the instruments other than drums and orchestral contributions, it featured vocal performances from Helado Negro, Satomi Matsuzaki and Merrill Garbus.

In November 2018, Dupuis released her first book of poetry, Mouthguard. In October 2022, her second book of poetry Cry Perfume was released by Black Ocean Press. In an essay for Talkhouse, Dupuis described the book as about grief, harm reduction, and said it "grapples with [her] work as a musician—all the icky moments the artist-unfriendly industry inflicts, and all the ways music and its communities have given [her] reasons to live." It received positive reviews from Publishers Weekly, Ploughshares and Autostraddle, was listed as a best book of the year by Rough Trade (shops) and Two Dollar Radio, and was praised by authors Hanif Abdurraqib, Eileen Myles and Wendy Xu. She has continued to publish as a freelance writer for Tape Op Magazine, Spin, and other publications.

Through the label Carpark Records, Dupuis runs an imprint called Wax Nine; it is named for her mother's pen name as a writer for Punk (magazine). The label has released albums by Johanna Warren, Melkbelly, and Spacemoth. In 2020, Wax Nine began to publish an online poetry and art journal, which has featured writing from Melissa Lozada-Oliva, Jenny Zhang, and Richard Chiem. Dupuis contributed to the 2020 benefit compilation The Song is Coming From Inside the House, organized by Strange Ranger in light of the COVID-19 pandemic. Dupuis' mixtape 1331 is scheduled to release on July 10, 2026.

== Personal life ==
Dupuis is a vegan, and as of 2018, she has eaten a vegan diet for more than thirteen years. She also is bisexual and demisexual. She is an avid runner and has trained for marathons on tour. She has been in a long-term relationship with Dylan Baldi of Cloud Nothings. In June 2024, Dupuis was injured in a bicycle accident that shattered her elbow and required reconstructive surgeries.

Dupuis was raised by her mother Diane Dupuis, an artist and former public school teacher. She grew up with her mother's boyfriend who was a dog trainer, which inspired Dupuis as an advocate for animal rescue. She has fostered and adopted pit bulls. Dupuis' late father, William D. Kornreich, worked as an A&R at ZE Records, Buddah Records, and United Artists, and helped found the Rock and Roll Hall of Fame.

== Discography ==
=== Speedy Ortiz ===
==== Studio albums ====
- Major Arcana (2013, Carpark)
- Foil Deer (2015, Carpark)
- Twerp Verse (2018, Carpark)
- Rabbit Rabbit (2023, Wax Nine)

=== Sad13 ===
==== Studio albums ====
- Slugger (2016, Carpark)
- Haunted Painting (2020, Wax Nine)
- 1331 (2026, Exploding In Sound Records)
