= Jerry DeCicca =

American singer-songwriter

Jerry David DeCicca (born July 2, 1974) is an American singer-songwriter and producer from Columbus, Ohio.

DeCicca founded and fronted the Ohio-based indie folk band The Black Swans before going solo in 2012. He has also produced a wide range of folk and country artists and collaborated with jazz, indie, and experimental musicians. In addition to his musical career, DeCicca owns and operates a vocational rehabilitation agency that primarily serves the Hill Country and San Antonio areas of Texas, where he currently resides.

== Career ==
=== 2000s ===
After spending the latter half of the 90s occasionally recording under his own name, DeCicca founded the band The Black Swans in 2004 as a vehicle for his songs. The band toured extensively, building a following and releasing critically acclaimed albums on various indie labels.

The debut Black Swans album, Who Will Walk in the Darkness with You?, was released on the Delmore Recording Society label in 2004. AllMusic's Thom Jurek, in a glowing review of the album, wrote: "Being able to carry dirge-like ballads with purpose and tautness is a skill, and DeCicca's abilities are consummate."

In July 2008, band member Noel Sayre died in a swimming accident.

=== 2010s ===
The final Black Swans album, Occasion For Song, was written as an unofficial tribute to Sayre, and features many songs that touch on themes of mortality and loss. The album garnered positive reviews from Mojo, Uncut, and No Depression. Pitchfork called the album a "complex, even contradictory record, not just the Black Swans' best but one of the most incisive and moving mediations on life and the loss of it in recent memory".

Following the release of Occasion For Song, DeCicca relocated to London to write and demo the songs that would comprise his first solo album, 2014's Understanding Land, featuring friends Kelley Deal, Will Oldham (aka Bonnie Prince Billy), and drummer Ryan Jewell. The album also includes contributions by legendary Muscle Shoals Rhythm Section pianist Spooner Oldham. The response to the album was favorable, with PopMatters calling it "a deeply comforting collection, one that reaches out rather than coiling inward, and Aquarium Drunkard declaring it "a quietly confident album".

2013 saw the release of the DeCicca-produced album For The World, by outsider folk artist Ed Askew. For The World featured, among others, guitarist Marc Ribot, singer-songwriter Sharon Van Etten, and harpist Mary Lattimore, as well as DeCicca's partner, Eve Searls, who appeared as a vocalist on the album's single, "Blue Eyed Baby."

Around this time, DeCicca and Searls relocated to New Braunfels, Texas, where DeCicca began increasing his production profile. 2017 saw the Drag City release of Chris Gantry's At the House Of Cash, which was executive produced by DeCicca and featured contributions from Bill Callahan and Edith Frost.

DeCicca's day job providing community education for a mental healthcare provider required him to spend many hours in the car driving between 19 different counties in Texas' Hill County; DeCicca used this time to conceive the songs that would comprise his next solo album, Time The Teacher, which was released in 2018. Uncut named the album "Americana Album of The Month" in its March 2018 issue, while The Fader raved that the album represented "a remarkable feat of empathy."

After relocating to Bulverde, Texas, DeCicca contacted Augie Meyers, a songwriter, multi-instrumentalist, and founding member of Dough Sahm's Sir Douglas Quintet. DeCicca recorded ten songs with Meyers at Blue Cat Studios in San Antonio. The fruits of this session would not be released until 2021's The Unlikely Optimist And His Domestic Adventures, preceded by 2018's Burning Daylight, recorded the previous year. Aquarium Drunkard praised the album's "raw and driving heartland rock." Stereogum, also remarking on the album's "more enlivened" setting, premiered the album's first single "Here With You".

Also in 2018, DeCicca produced the first new recordings of folk singer and over-the-road trucker Will Beeley for the Tompkins Square label.

In 2019, DeCicca toured with Bill Callahan, who named Time The Teacher one of the "Best Texas Records" for UK-based webzine, Mr. Porter.

During this time, DeCicca also collaborated with experimental artist Mike Shiflet for a project called Walks On the Beach. The duo released the Adoption Tapes LP and cassette in 2015.

=== 2020s ===
In early 2021, DeCicca released, via digital platforms, a ten-song album titled The Unlikely Optimist And His Domestic Adventures, featuring collaborations with Augie Meyers as well as with Austin mainstay Ralph White. The album was released on vinyl by Worried Songs later that year. Tyler Wilcox, writing for Aquarium Drunkard, opined "The Unlikely Optimist is plainspoken without being plain, earthbound but floating free," and that it "isn't a record that grabs you by the collar with its greatness. But make no mistake, it's great."

In 2023, DeCicca released his fifth solo album, New Shadows, which Stereogum reported "features appearances from an eclectic assortment of musicians including Aquilles Navarro of Irreversible Entanglements, David Hidalgo and Steve Berlin of Los Lobos, Jeff Parker, Rosali, James Brandon Lewis, and Brian Harnetty. The title track delves deeper into synthesizers and digital voice alteration than ever expected from a Jerry DeCicca project, lacing in saxophone and abundant guitar action too en route to on a sort of alternate-timeline ’80s movie soundtrack vibe." Uproxx listed it as a 2023 Album of the Year, saying, "DeCicca mines a very specific aesthetic on New Shadows that derives from once-disreputable, now-beloved albums made in the ’80s by the top troubadours of the ’60s and ’70s."

== Production work ==
In addition to his own songwriting and session work, DeCicca is a producer and has been involved with the supervision of archival releases for labels such as Drag City and Numero.

== Critical reception ==
Both with The Black Swans and as a solo artist, DeCicca has earned favorable reviews from publications such as Pitchfork, Mojo, Uncut, No Depression, Dusted, Aquarium Drunkard, Stereogum, Popmatters, and The Fader. According to Pitchfork, "DeCicca is a careful, precise songwriter, but the songs don't necessarily sound written. Instead, they seem like they occurred to him naturally and ineluctably." In a profile premiering his single "I See Horizons," Stereogum wrote that while DeCicca "fits comfortably into this seemingly endless continuum of slightly askew salt-of-the-earth troubadours ... there is truly no one like Jerry David DeCicca."

Time the Teacher was named Americana Album of the Month in the March 2018 issue of Uncut magazine and was named by Bill Callahan in UK-based webzine Mr. Porter as one of the "Best Texas records".

As of April 2021, DeCicca's song "Watermelon" has racked up over half a million Spotify plays.

== Discography ==
With The Black Swans

- Who Will Walk in the Darkness With You? (Delmore Recording Society, 2004)
- Change! (The Listening Party, 2007)
- Words Are Stupid (St Ives, 2010)
- Don't Blame The Stars (Misra, 2011)
- Occasion For Song (Misra, 2012)

Solo

- Understanding Land (self-released, 2014)
- Burning Daylight (Super Secret Records, 2018)
- Burning Daylight (Acoustic After-party Version) (self-released, 2019)
- Time The Teacher (Impossible Ark, 2018)
- The Unlikely Optimist And His Domestic Adventures (Worried Songs, 2021)
- New Shadows (self-released, 2023)
