= The Polyamorous Affair =

American electronic band

- The Polyamorous Affair performing at Rotor Salon in Berlin on 10 September 2010.

Background information
- Origin: Los Angeles, California, US (United States)
- Genres: Electronica, indie, alternative
- Years active: 2008–present
- Labels: Winter Palace Records
- Members: Eddie Chacon; Sissy Sainte-Marie
- Website: www.thepolyamorousaffair.com

The Polyamorous Affair is an electronic band based in Los Angeles consisting of producer/songwriter Eddie Chacon and vocalist Sissy Sainte-Marie.

== Career ==
The band's self-released debut, The Polyamorous Affair, appeared in 2008. Their sophomore effort, Bolshevik Disco, followed in 2009. The band's third album, Strange Bedfellows, was released in 2010. The Polyamorous Affair is known for its eccentric music videos and multimedia live performances.

In 2009, the band co-headlined the Manimal Festival in Pioneertown, California with Edward Sharpe and the Magnetic Zeros and Warpaint. In 2010, the band contributed "Putting Out Fire," the theme from Cat People, for the David Bowie tribute record released on Manimal Vinyl. In 2010, the band relocated to Berlin and released Strange Bedfellows.

== Discography ==
=== Studio albums ===
| Year of release | Album | Label |
|---|---|---|
| 2008 | The Polyamorous Affair | Self-released |
| 2009 | Bolshevik Disco | Manimal Vinyl/Winter Palace |
| 2010 | Strange Bedfellows | Winter Palace |

=== Singles ===
| Year of release | Title | Album |
|---|---|---|
| 2008 | "Babayaga" | The Polyamorous Affair |
| 2008 | "Merry-Go-Round" | The Polyamorous Affair |
| 2009 | "White Hot Magic" | Bolshevik Disco |
| 2010 | "New York City" | Bolshevik Disco |
| 2010 | "Hypnotized" | Strange Bedfellows |
| 2010 | "Bright One" | Strange Bedfellows |

== Videography ==
| Year of release | Title | Director |
|---|---|---|
| 2008 | Babayaga | Keith Musil |
| 2008 | Like Animal | Keith Musil |
| 2009 | White Hot Magic | Keith Musil |
| 2010 | You Are | Dola Baroni |
| 2010 | New York City | Ravi Dhar |
| 2010 | Softer and Softer | Nuka Wølk Mathiassen |
| 2010 | Rebel | Velquire Veljkovic and xorzyzt |
| 2011 | Fantasy | Velquire Veljkovic and xorzyzt |
| 2012 | Whoever Controls the Groove | Xhico |
