= Speedy Ortiz =

American indie rock band

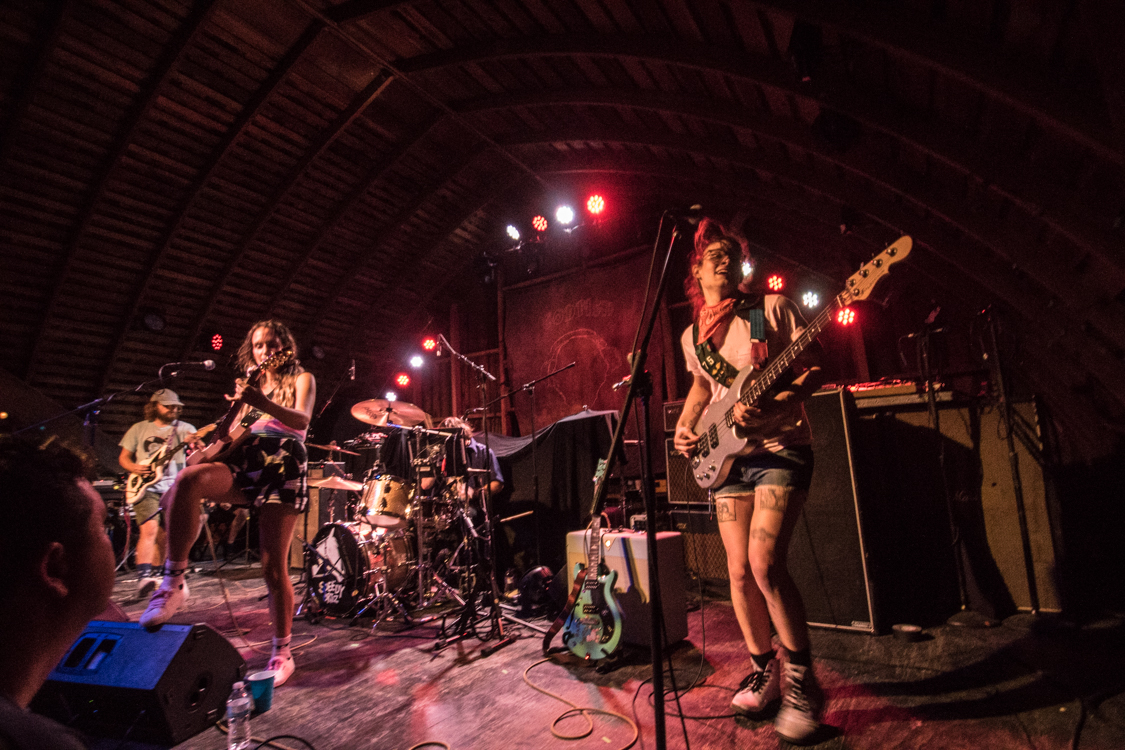
- Speedy Ortiz performing at Codfish Hollow, Maquoketa, Iowa in 2018

Background information
- Origin: Northampton, Massachusetts, United States
- Genres: Indie rock; alternative rock; grunge; noise pop
- Years active: 2011–present
- Labels: Carpark; Exploding in Sound
- Spinoffs: Sad13
- Members: Sadie Dupuis; Andy Molholt; Audrey Zee Whitesides; Joey Doubek
- Past members: Matt Robidoux; Devin McKnight; Mike Falcone; Darl Ferm
- Website: speedyortiz.com

Speedy Ortiz is an American indie rock band from Northampton, Massachusetts, United States. Originally a solo project for founder Sadie Dupuis, from 2011 a full band incarnation has released three EPs and three LPs mostly on Carpark Records. As of 2022, the band consists of Dupuis, Audrey Zee Whitesides, Andy Molholt, and Joey Doubek.

== History ==
=== Early years (2011–2012) ===
The band originated in 2011 as Sadie Dupuis' solo project shortly after she moved to Northampton to work on her MFA. While Dupuis was teaching songwriting at a summer camp, she would also record her own material on a laptop in her spare time. Two releases resulted from this solo endeavor, the Cop Kicker EP, and the album, The Death of Speedy Ortiz.

The band was named after a character from the comic book series Love & Rockets who committed suicide. Dupuis explained that when she began making demos for this project, her "roommate had passed away of a heart attack super young...And [her] childhood best friend had overdosed." She found the storyline relatable and named the band "Speedy Ortiz" in reference "to how everybody else deals with his loss. And that is sort of what the songs were for me in the beginning."

The project expanded into a full band in late 2011. The group independently released "Taylor Swift" b/w "Swim Fan," recorded by Paul Q Kolderie, which was followed by 2012's Sports, released on Exploding in Sound Records. The Phoenix named Speedy Ortiz the "Best New Band in MA" in 2012.

=== Major Arcana and Real Hair (2013–14) ===
Prior to the release of their debut studio album, the band released "Ka-Prow!" b/w "Hexxy" on April 30, 2013, via Inflated Records.

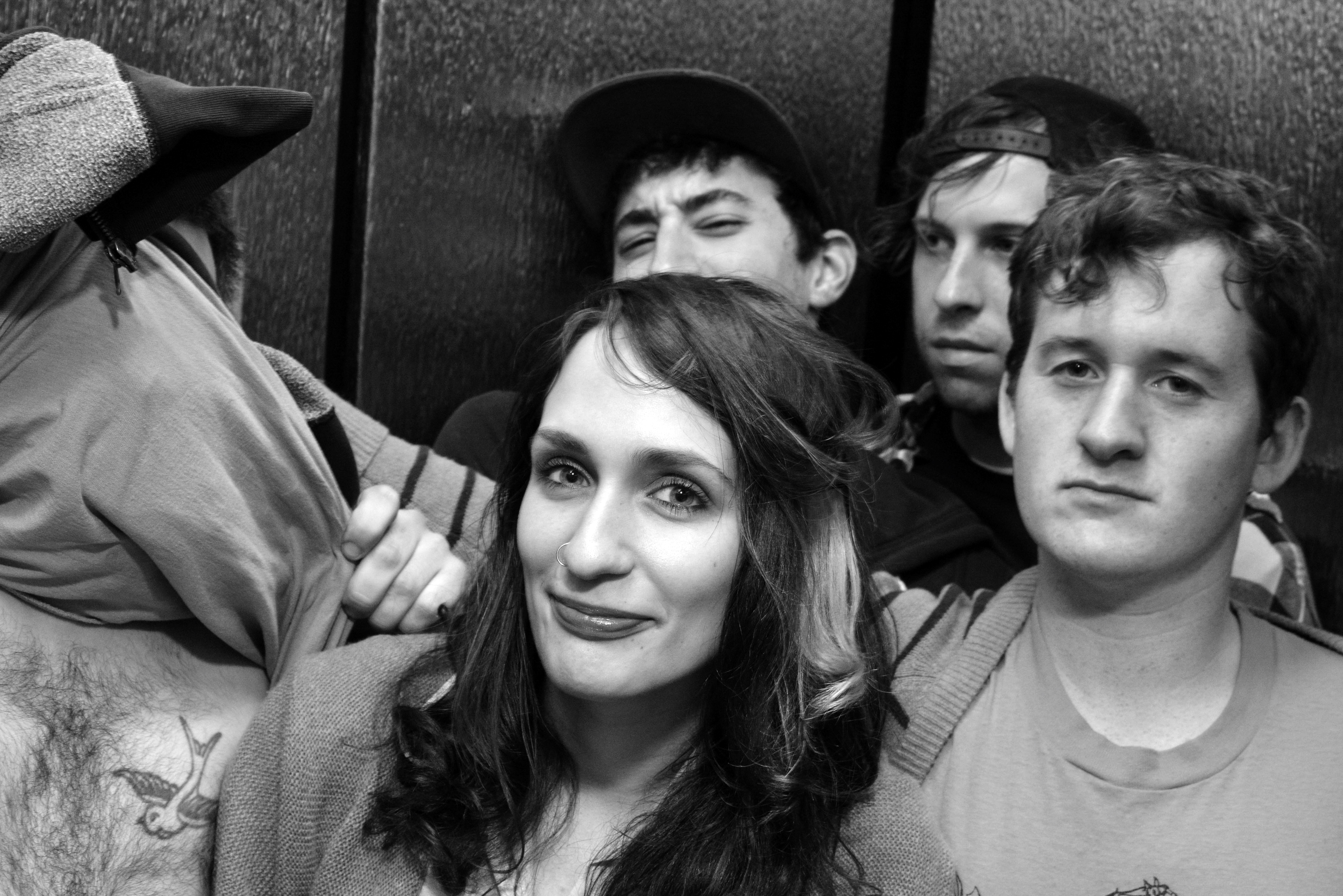
The 2013 lineup of the band, plus friend. L - R Unknown, Sadie Dupuis, Darl Ferm, Mike Falcone, Matt Robidoux

Major Arcana was released on Carpark Records on July 9, 2013. Recorded by Justin Pizzoferrato (engineer for Dinosaur Jr and Thurston Moore), the album was recorded over 4 days at Sonelab. Inspired by a history of the occult book that Dupuis read, "the lyrics reference occult staples like sulfur and salt". The song "No Below" was used in the soundtrack of the Square Enix game Life Is Strange: Before the Storm.

The album received critical acclaim upon release. Pitchfork's Lindsay Zoladz gave the album 8.4 and deemed it "Best New Music", writing that "Speedy Ortiz join a small club of young indie rock bands writing lyrics that are actually worth poring over". Meanwhile, The A.V. Club's David Brusie wrote "Major Arcana is a markedly assured debut, one that makes Speedy Ortiz an act to watch. Like its songs, the band's detonation is inevitable."

In support of the album, the band booked and self-organized a 6-week US tour, in addition to a 17-date tour in all-ages venues and DIY spaces as well as opening for The Breeders and Stephen Malkmus and the Jicks for a run of dates. Additional stops included appearances at Primavera, Bonnaroo, and Pitchfork Festival.

On February 11, 2014, the band released the Real Hair EP on Carpark Records reuniting with Paul Q Kolderie and Justin Pizzoferrato. The EP was written during a lull period between tours over four days, "before we left on our summer tour before the album came out." In support of the release, the band embarked on a UK/EU tour with Joanna Gruesome.

In 2014, guitarist Matt Robidoux was replaced by fellow Massachusetts musician Devin McKnight of Grass is Green. On July 11, 2014, the band shared the song "Bigger Party" via the 2014 Adult Swim Singles Program. In the fall, the band released another song, "Doomsday," via Famous Class' LAMC series in which all digital proceeds went to the Ariel Panero Memorial Fund at VH1 Save the Music.

=== Foil Deer (2015–2017) ===
On January 21, 2015, Dupuis announced their second studio album, Foil Deer, which was released on April 21, 2015. Written over a month-long retreat in the woods of Connecticut and recorded over three weeks at producer Nicolas Vernhes' Rare Book Room studio in Brooklyn, Dupuis described the album as "a more textured and calculated record than its volcanic predecessor, the writing more measured and less reactionary".

The album's title and cover art were inspired by the sculpture "Le Cerf" by Ossip Zadkine. Dupuis noted in an interview with Pitchfork that as a "stay-at-home talking-to-no one kind of person", she identified with the "image of this gilded, shiny deer, which is naturally sort of a skittish, reclusive animal".

2015 was a breakout year for Speedy Ortiz, as Foil Deer was met with critical praise. Mike Katzif of NPR described Dupuis "as one of rock's most compelling young voices and lyricists". Jill Mapes of Pitchfork noted in her review that, "[T]he album is ferocious and visceral, the lyrics gleaming with threads involving sharp blades both literal and figurative...As Dupuis grows more self-possessed, she and her bandmates veer into their most ambitious compositions to date." Joe Coscarelli of The New York Times praised the album, noting that it was "As if Fiona Apple joined a punk band, with...even more vocal confidence".

Also in 2015, Speedy Ortiz cleaned up in the top three categories of The Boston Music Awards, including artist, album/EP (Foil Deer), and song of the year ("Raising the Skate"). They also won for best charitable effort for donating net proceeds from their latest tour to the Girls Rock Camp Foundation. Foil Deer also earned the band the title of Noisey's Artist of the Year for 2015. On the band, Noisey said: "They exist to give back to their community. They exist to empower you. They exist to make you put your fist in the air. The band embodies what the genre of punk rock started out as—powerful guitars and a dominant stage presence—but have also brought along the bold message that no matter who you are or what you’re feeling, you’re OK."

In support of the record, the band toured extensively in North America and Europe tours supported by artists including Mitski, Alex G, Downtown Boys, Palehound, Krill, and Trust Fund as well as embarking on co-headline dates with Ex Hex, The Good Life, and Hop Along. The band also made appearances at Outside Lands, Forecastle Festival, and Riot Fest.

In December 2015, the band embarked on an all-ages benefit tour with 100% of net proceeds to the Girls Rock Camp Foundation, "a non-profit that generates funding for camps designed to help girls develop real-world skills and artistic expression through musical collaboration". On May 9, 2016, the band announced the Foiled Again EP featuring remixes from Lizzo, Lazerbeak, and Open Mike Eagle and outtakes from Foil Deer. The EP included the track "Death Note", which took its name from the eponymous manga/anime series. That September, their song Plough was used as the weather music for episode 94 of Welcome to Night Vale.

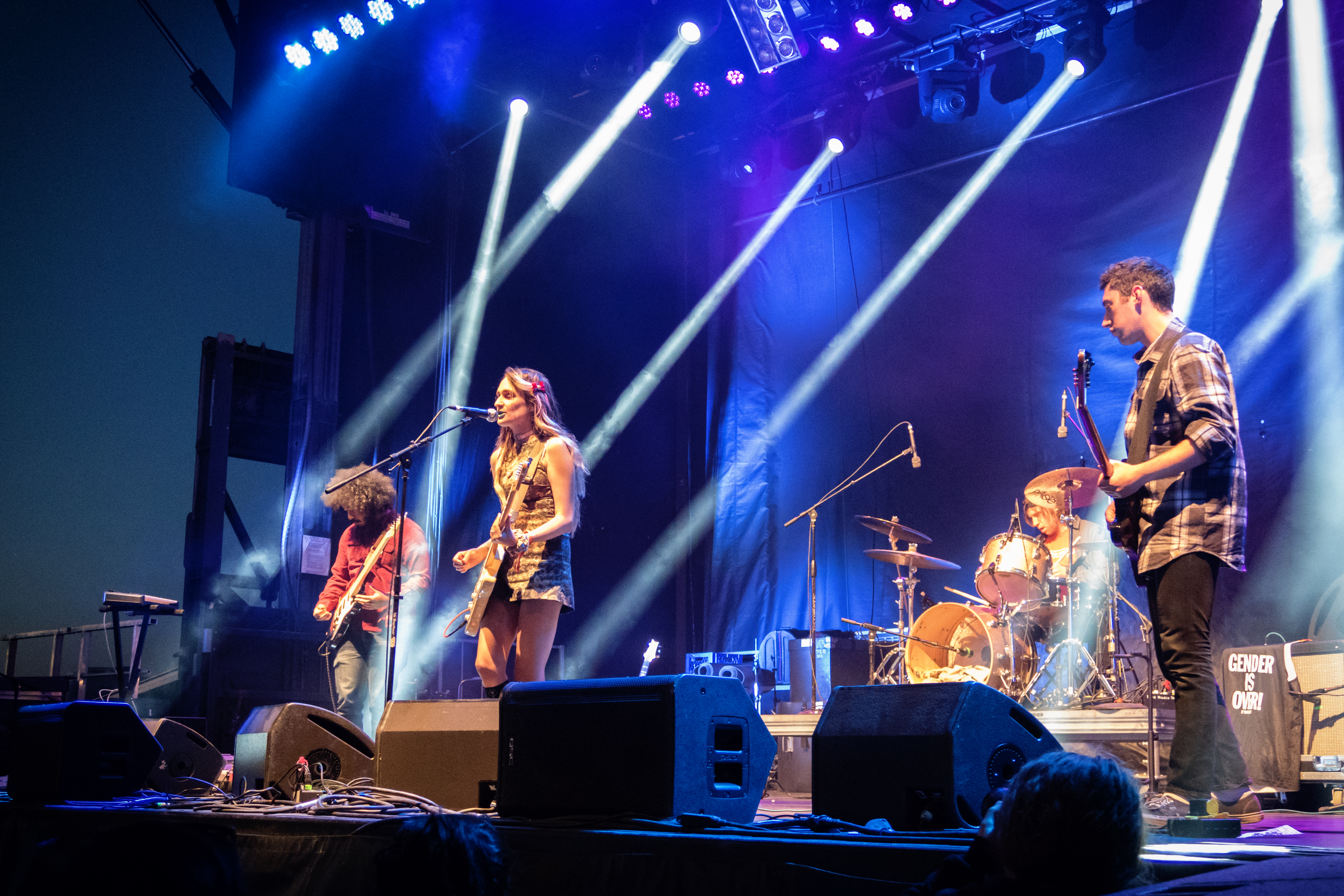
Speedy Ortiz performing at the Sasquatch Music Festival in 2016

On February 20, 2017, the band released the track "In My Way" as part of the Our First 100 Days compilation, benefiting organizations that support causes endangered by the Trump administration. On July 7, 2017, the band released the song "Screen Gem" to coincide with the announcement of Devin McKnight's departure. Proceeds from the track sales benefited the criminal justice reform nonprofit CLOSErikers at McKnight's request.

=== Twerp Verse, line-up changes and Rabbit Rabbit (2018–present) ===
On February 21, 2018, the band released the lead single "Lucky 88" from their third album Twerp Verse, which was released on April 27. Recorded at Silent Barn and mixed by Mike Mogis, the album was actually the band's second attempt at a new record as a previous attempt was scrapped following the 2016 United States presidential election. Dupuis said that "The songs on the [scrapped] album that were strictly personal or lovey dovey just didn't mean anything to me anymore". Twerp Verse was also the first album to feature rhythm guitarist Andy Molholt, formerly of Laser Background.

“Lean In When I Suffer", the second single from the album, was released on March 21, 2018, accompanied by a video premiered by The Fader. "Villain", the third single from the album, was released on April 11, 2018. Ferm left the band shortly after Twerp Verse's release, and was replaced by Audrey Zee Whitesides (formerly of Worriers). Falcone departed the band in 2019, with former Allison Crutchfield drummer Joey Doubek taking his place.

On April 12, 2023, the band released a new single entitled "Scabs". On June 1, 2023, the band shared details of their fourth studio album Rabbit Rabbit, set for release on Dupuis' own label Wax Nine on September 1, 2023. To coincide with the announcement, the band shared a second single from the album entitled "You S02".

== Members ==
Current

- Sadie Dupuis – lead vocals, lead guitar, synthesizer (2011–present)
- Andy Molholt – rhythm guitar (2017–present)
- Audrey Zee Whitesides – bass, backing vocals (2018–present)
- Joey Doubek – drums (2019–present)

Former

- Devin McKnight – rhythm guitar (2014–2017)
- Matt Robidoux – rhythm guitar (2011–2014)
- Mike Falcone – drums, backing vocals (2011–2019)
- Darl Ferm – bass (2011–2018)

Timeline

== Discography ==
Albums

- Major Arcana (2013, Carpark)
- Foil Deer (2015, Carpark)
- Twerp Verse (2018, Carpark)
- Rabbit Rabbit (2023, Wax Nine)

EPs

- Sports (2012, Exploding in Sound)
- Real Hair (2014, Carpark)
- Foiled Again (2016, Carpark)

Demos

- Cop Kicker EP (2011, self-released)
- The Death of Speedy Ortiz (2011, self-released)

Singles

- "Taylor Swift" b/w "Swim Fan" (2012, self-released)
- "Ka-Prow!" b/w "Hexxy" (2013, Inflated)
- "No Below" (2013, Carpark)
- "Tiger Tank" (2013, Carpark)
- "Bigger Party" (2014, Adult Swim)
- Split with Chris Weisman ("Doomsday") (2014, LAMC)
- "Raising The Skate" (2015, Carpark)
- "The Graduates" (2015, Carpark)
- "Swell Content" (2015)
- "In My Way" (2017)
- "Screen Gem" (2017)
- "Lucky 88" (2017)
- "Lean In When I Suffer" (2018)
- "Villain" (2018)
- "Blood Keeper" (Liz Phair cover) (2018, Carpark)
- Adult Swim Singles ("DTMFA" b/w "Bigger Party") (2018)
- "Cutco" (2021)
- "Scabs" (2023)
- "You S02" (2023)
- "Plus One" (2023)
- "Ghostwriter" (2023)
