= Rabbit Rabbit =

Studio album by Speedy Ortiz
- Released: September 1, 2023
- Studio: Rancho De La Luna (Joshua Tree); Sonic Ranch (Tornillo)
- Genre: Indie rock
- Length: 44:31
- Label: Wax Nine
- Producer: Sadie Dupuis; Sarah Tudzin; Speedy Ortiz

Speedy Ortiz chronology
Twerp Verse (2018)	Rabbit Rabbit (2023)

Rabbit Rabbit is the fourth studio album by American indie rock band Speedy Ortiz. It was released on September 1, 2023, through Wax Nine, and is their first album in five years following 2018’s Twerp Verse.

== Background and development ==
Work on the album started in 2021. To kick-start the process, lead singer Sadie Dupuis wrote the words "Rabbit Rabbit" on top of a page. She met Sarah Tudzin, the producer of the album, while hosting a reading at a Los Angeles bookstore. Tudzin called her an "ultimate galaxy-brain genius", describing her writing, guitar playing and producing as "true art". After a period of preproduction by her bandmates later that year, the band started off working on the album together on December 1, 2021, "for good luck". The project welcomes longtime touring bassist Audrey Zee Whitesides and drummer Joey Doubek into the band, who have since become full-time band members. Recording eventually started on March 22–30 at Rancho de la Luna in Joshua Tree California and continued April 1, 2022, at Sonic Ranch Studios in West Texas. The announcement of the album, release of the second single and the album also came about at the first of a month, respectively. Dupuis revealed that the band "oversynchronized the numerical Rabbit Rabbit-ness of it all for max luck". As a result, the recurring dates are a "superstitious incantation" the singer practices as a coping mechanism with OCD and trauma she adopted as a child.

In preparation for this record, Dupuis went to explore questions about childhood trauma and "her own survival mechanisms". The "forced stillness" of the COVID-19 pandemic led her to tap into topics she had not used for songwriting purposes before, such as crying and several uncomfortable feelings Dupuis attaches to this reaction. This would inspire one of the tracks titled "Cry Cry Cry". Another story she recalls is the abuse by a family member and the lack of intervention by her parents. In order to channel "scenes and sentiments from decades past", Dupuis wanted to honor bands she loved when she first learned to play guitar.

== Composition ==
Rabbit Rabbit combines "private reckonings and sonic ambitions". The production consists of "dissonant guitar lines and meter-shifting structures" with Dupuis' "obliquely and sometimes bluntly" vocals on top. The album tackles topics such as vulnerability, power and anger. Mixing and co-production was handled by Sarah Tudzin while mastering was managed by Emily Lazar and Chris Allgood at the Lodge in New York.

== Critical reception ==
Professional ratings
Aggregate scores
Source	Rating
Metacritic	82/100
Review scores
Source	Rating
AllMusic	4.5/5 stars
And It Don't Stop	A
Exclaim!	7/10
Pitchfork	7.5/10

Rabbit Rabbit received a score of 82 out of 100 on review aggregator Metacritic based on six critics' reviews, indicating "universal acclaim". Writing for AllMusic, Heather Phares felt that, "Untangling Speedy Ortiz's hyper-detailed words and sounds is always time well spent, but these fierce, surprising songs are some of their most satisfying work yet." In a positive review, Dave MacIntyre of Exclaim! saw Rabbit Rabbit as a continuation of their "trademark noisy, peppy grunge-pop sound" with occasional elements of "emo and post-hardcore texture". While it might not be "a lights-out album from start to finish", MacInyre classifies the album as yet "another sterling entry" in their discography. Alfred Soto of Pitchfork called Rabbit Rabbit "one of those albums whose complications provide as much pleasure as hooks-hooks-hooks" as "eschewing climaxes and long solos allows this Philadelphia quartet to preen in the best sense: Speedy Ortiz project confidence in their clatter, in the eel-like slitheriness of their tempos". Veteran critic Robert Christgau applauded the quartet's "expensively textured" indie rock while finding the lyrics to be "fairly interesting", although ultimately regarding the record as "music over lyrics": "Guitar effects combust and spill out of the mix without number, so dense and engaging that it hardly matters that you don’t know just what she’s singing about".

== Track listing ==
All tracks are written by Sarah Elizabeth Dupuis.

Rabbit Rabbit track listing
No.	Title	Length
1.	"Kim Cattrall"	3:18
2.	"You S02"	3:37
3.	"Scabs"	2:51
4.	"Plus One"	3:16
5.	"Cry Cry Cry"	4:26
6.	"Ballad of Y & S"	3:03
7.	"Kitty"	2:08
8.	"Who's Afraid of the Bath"	4:22
9.	"Ranch vs. Ranch"	3:01
10.	"Emergency & Me"	2:49
11.	"The Sunday"	3:20
12.	"Brace Thee"	5:29
13.	"Ghostwriter"	2:51
Total length:		44:31

== Personnel ==
Speedy Ortiz

- Joey Doubek – drums, shaker, tambourine, bells, synthesizer, spoons, shotglass, BB gun, whispers, slicer, production
- Sadie Dupuis – vocals, baritone guitar, electric guitar, acoustic guitar, twelve-string guitar, doubleneck guitar, drum machine, synthesizer, piano, bedpan, motorcycle box, tambourine, production, recording, editing, artwork
- Andy Molholt – electric guitar, acoustic guitar, twelve-string guitar, synthesizer, Wurlitzer, piano, Rhodes, OM-1, debit card, Mellotron, vocals, vocaloid, production, editing
- Audrey Zee Whitesides – bass guitar, eight-string bass guitar, acoustic guitar, piano, vocals, delay, production

Additional musicians

- Anna Arboles – guest vocals
- Ram Cantu – guest vocals
- David Catching – lap steel guitar
- Darl Ferm – guitar
- Devin McKnight – guitar
- Sarah Tudzin – guest vocals

Technical

- Sarah Tudzin – production, mixing, recording
- Emily Lazar – mastering
- Chris Allgood – mastering
- Ram Cantu – engineering, editing
- Andy Tyler Clarke – engineering
- Jon Russo – engineering
- Jesse Weiss – engineering
- Amar Lal – editing
