= Birds Make Good Neighbors =

2005 indie rock album

Studio album by The Rosebuds
- Released: September 13, 2005
- Recorded: April–May 2005 at Jujitsu Studios, Carrboro, NC
- Genre: Indie pop
- Length: 36:35
- Label: Merge Records (CD); Goodnight Records (LP)
- Producer: Brian Paulson

The Rosebuds chronology
The Rosebuds Unwind (2005)	Birds Make Good Neighbors (2005)	Night of the Furies (2007)

Professional ratings
Review scores
Source	Rating
Allmusic	link
Entertainment Weekly	(A−)
Pitchfork Media	(8.1/10) link

Birds Make Good Neighbors is the second album by North Carolina indie rock band The Rosebuds. It was released on September 13, 2005 by Merge Records on CD, and one week later on vinyl by Goodnight Records.

It received generally positive reviews, with a score of 78/100 on Metacritic.

== Track listing ==
1. "Hold Hands and Fight" – 2:47
2. "Boxcar" – 3:39
3. "Leaves Do Fall" – 3:53
4. "Wildcat" – 2:39
5. "The Lovers' Rights" – 2:22
6. "Blue Bird" – 4:26
7. "Outnumbered" – 2:57
8. "Shake Our Tree" – 2:43
9. "Let Us Go" – 3:54
10. "Warm Where You Lay" – 2:53
11. "4-Track Love Song" – 4:16

== Personnel ==
- Kelly Crisp - vocals, piano, keyboards, Wurlitzer, hand claps
- Ivan Howard - vocals, guitar, keyboards, hand claps
- Lee Waters - drums and percussion
- Wes Phillips - stand-up bass
