= Real Hair =

EP by Speedy Ortiz
- Released: February 11, 2014
- Genre: Indie rock, noise pop, alternative rock
- Length: 13:17
- Label: Carpark Records
- Producer: Paul Q. Kolderie

Speedy Ortiz chronology
Major Arcana (2013)	Real Hair (2014)	Foil Deer (2015)

Professional ratings
Aggregate scores
Source	Rating
Metacritic	75/100
Review scores
Source	Rating
AllMusic	3.5/5 stars
Consequence of Sound	B
NME	8/10
Pitchfork Media	7.6/10
PopMatters	7/10 stars

Real Hair is the second EP by American indie rock band Speedy Ortiz, released on February 11, 2014 by Carpark Records. The EP draws "inspiration from contemporary Top 40 and R&B radio in addition to their regular arsenal of guitar rock".

The artwork for the album features a childhood photo of fellow Massachusetts band Pile's bassist Matt Connery.

Ahead of its official release, the album premiered on Pitchfork Media's Advance streaming service.

== Personnel ==
Sadie Dupuis - Guitar, Voice
Matt Robidoux - Guitar
Darl Ferm - Bass Guitar
Mike Falcone - Drums, Voice
Paul Q. Kolderie - Recorder, Mixer

== Track listing ==
All songs by Speedy Ortiz.

No.	Title	Length
1.	"American Horror"	3:32
2.	"Oxygal"	3:19
3.	"Everything's Bigger"	2:37
4.	"Shine Theory"	3:49
Total length:		13:17
