= The Rosebuds Make Out =

Studio album by The Rosebuds
- Released: October 7, 2003
- Label: Merge (CD); Pigeon English (LP)

The Rosebuds chronology
The Rosebuds Make Out (2003)	The Rosebuds Unwind (2005)

Professional ratings
Review scores
Source	Rating
AllMusic	4/5 stars
Pitchfork Media	7.3/10

The Rosebuds Make Out is The Rosebuds' first studio album, released in 2003.

== Track listing ==
1. "Back to Boston" – 2:28
2. "Kicks in the Schoolyard" – 2:28
3. "My Downtown Friends" – 2:17
4. "Wishes for Kisses" – 3:15
5. "Boys Who Love Girls" – 2:20
6. "Drunkards Worst Nightmare" – 3:44
7. "Big Heartbreak" – 3:34
8. "Waiting for the Carnival" – 3:54
9. "What Can I Do?" – 2:08
10. "Signature Drinks" – 4:36
11. "Make Out Song" – 5:49

== Personnel ==
- Ivan Howard – vocals/guitars
- Kelly Crisp – keyboards
- Billy Alphin – drums
- Jonathan Bass – drums
- Jim Brantley – dobro
- Tyler Kendall – cornet
