= Defrocked and Kicking the Habit =

Studio album by Soltero
- Released: April 2003
- Label: Handsome Records

Soltero chronology
| Science Will Figure You Out (2001) | Defrocked and Kicking the Habit (2003) | The Tongues You Have Tied (2004) |

Professional ratings
Review scores
| Source | Rating |
|---|---|
| AllMusic | link |
| Pop Matters | |

Defrocked and Kicking the Habit is the second LP by Soltero. It was recorded in Shutesbury, MA by Ben Sterling and Somerville, MA by Steve Mayone. As with Soltero's first record, it features the Mobius Band amongst others. It was released in April 2003.

== Track listing ==
All tracks by Tim Howard

1. "I'll Be a Writer" – 3:39
2. "Fight Song for True Love" – 3:24
3. "On the Ropes" – 4:40
4. "Digging" – 4:27
5. "Autobahn" – 5:05
6. "Boys of Brighton" – 4:09
7. "Vaporetto" – 3:07
8. "The Moment You Said Yes" – 4:48
9. "Paradise City" – 5:30
10. "I See It Now" – 4:11
11. "Sinking Ship" – 3:38

== Personnel ==
- Alex Braden – accordion
- Jeff Breeze – vox organ
- Tim Howard – banjo, guitar, vox organ, toy instruments
- Thomas Hummel – horn
- Casey Keenan – drums
- Steve Mayone – guitar, drums, bass, engineer
- Peter Sax – bass, vox organ
- Tim Shea – engineer
- Ben Sterling – engineer, mastering
- Bernard Sterling – assistant
