= Hecuba (band) =

Hecuba is a band based in Los Angeles, California featuring performance artist Isabelle Albuquerque and musician and designer Jon Beasley. They have toured with Devendra Banhart, Bat for Lashes and Rainbow Arabia. They have released two albums on Manimal Vinyl since their formation in 2006. Their second release, Paradise, has received favorable reviews from NME, Pitchfork Media, LA Weekly and XLR8R. They performed at the Los Angeles premier of Wild Combination: a film about Arthur Russell (musician) performing their versions of Russell's music. Their third album "Modern" was released in 2012 on the LA-based label Germ.

== Discography ==
- Sir 12"/Download (April 2008 Manimal Vinyl)
- Paradise LP/CD/Download (May 2009 Manimal Vinyl)
- "Modern" LP/CD/Download (2012 Germ)

== Singles ==
- Suffering April 2009
- The Magic August 2009
