= Rituals of Mine =

American music project

- Origin: Sacramento, California, U.S.
- Genre: Electronic
- Years active: 2010–present
- Labels: Fake Four Inc.; Manimal Vinyl; Carpark Records
- Members: Terra Lopez
- Past members: Dani Fernandez; Genaro Ulloa; Nicholas Suhr; Jeffrey LaTour; Omar Barajas
- Website: www.ritualsofmine.com

Rituals of Mine (previously known as Sister Crayon) is an indie pop/electronic/alt R&B duo from Sacramento, California, founded in 2010, and led by vocalist Terra Lopez.

== History ==
Sister Crayon was formed in 2010 by Terra Lopez (vocals) and Dani Fernandez (samplers; MPC and Roland SPD-SX). Lopez had previously performed under the names Silent and Clementine. Explaining the new name Lopez said "I didn't want to be shy anymore, and I wanted to have a name that was bolder, and a completely different alter ego." The act was a duo for approximately one year before Genaro Ulloa (keys) and Nicholas Suhr (drums) joined.

Their debut video, for the track "(In) Reverse", was directed by New York fashion photographer Robert Ascroft. It was aired on MTV's LOGO network in May 2010. Sister Crayon recorded their full-length debut Bellow in Spring/Summer 2010 at the famous Hangar Studios in Sacramento, California. Five of the tracks appeared in a rawer form on their limited edition EP, only sold at shows.

In September 2010, they contributed a track to Manimal Vinyl's tribute to David Bowie titled We Were So Turned On: A Tribute to David Bowie, covering "The Bewlay Brothers". They also released a limited 7" split with Warpaint.

Bellow was released on Manimal Vinyl on February 22, 2011. In 2013 they toured the U.S. extensively in support of Bosnian Rainbows.

The group worked with the musician Omar Rodríguez-López to create their second album Devoted, which was released in February 2016 on his own imprint.

=== Rituals of Mine ===
In July 2016, Sister Crayon announced that they were changing their name to Rituals of Mine. Devoted was re-released as their major-label debut with new production and mixes. Wes Jones was a producer on the album with mastering by Tom Coyne. Lopez commented that "... sonically I just feel it's pretty next level compared to the initial release."

In October 2016, they had completed a tour with the Deftones and had the launch party for the new version of Devoted on Warner Brother's.

Their EP Sleeper Hold was released on October 4, 2019, via Carpark Records.

In 2020, Hype Nostalgia was released as a solo project by Lopez, with production assistance from Wes Jones and Dev the Goon. It was published by Carpark Records. The last song written for the album, Free Throw, is a collaboration with Kris (Kristina Esfandiari). It was inspired by bad experiences they've had with the music industry. The a Hype Nostalgia (Remixes) released on Carpark Records in 2021.

In 2025, Rituals of Mine enlisted hip-hop/jazz trio LabRats as the backing band.

In March 2026, Rituals of Mine released the Endure EP to acclaim within indie electronic circles. On November 13, 2026 they are releasing their first ever live album, OTRA featuring LabRats via Massive Publishing. Rituals of Mine is currently on tour with Tune-Yards.

== Discography ==
=== Albums ===
- Bellow (Manimal, 2011)
- Devoted (Rodriguez-Lopez Productions, February 2016)
- Devoted (Warner Brother's, September 2016)
- Hype Nostalgia (Carpark Records, 2020)
- Hype Nostalgia (Remixes) (Carpark Records, 2021)

=== EPs ===
- Sister Crayon (2010)
- Disquiet (2011)
- Cynic (2013)
- Still Cynic (2014)
- Sleeper Hold (Carpark Records, 2019)

=== Singles ===
- The Bewlay Brothers - Split 7" with Warpaint (Manimal, 2010)
- I'll Always Be In Love With You (2018)
- No Time to Go Numb (2018)
- Burst (2019)
- Heavyweight (2019)
- The Only Way Out Is Through (2023)
- Overcome (2023)
- Black Dog (2024)
- Bruise (2024)
- Head On (2024)

=== Compilation tracks ===
- The Bewlay Brothers (Manimal, 2010) Bowie cover for tribute album We Were So Turned On: A Tribute to David Bowie
