= Science Will Figure You Out =

Studio album by Soltero
- Released: August 2001
- Label: Kentuckyland

Soltero chronology
Science Will Figure You Out (2001)	Defrocked and Kicking the Habit (2003)

Professional ratings
Review scores
Source	Rating
Allmusic	link
Pop Matters	

Science Will Figure You Out is the first official release by Soltero, a.k.a. Tim Howard. It was recorded with Ben Sterling and the Mobius Band in Amherst, MA. It was released in August of 2001.

== Track listing ==
1. memorial drive
2. laundrydaydreams
3. bottomfeeder
4. communist love song
5. the priest
6. i am sitting in a room
7. 7 wonders
8. poughkeepsie's always proud
9. the missionary
10. kentuckyland
11. slow bomb
12. st. martin says 'hi'
