= Life Like (The Rosebuds album) =

Studio album by The Rosebuds
- Released: October 7, 2008
- Genre: Indie rock
- Length: 33:19
- Label: Merge Records MRG334

The Rosebuds chronology
Night of the Furies (2007)	Life Like (2008)	Loud Planes Fly Low (2011)

Professional ratings
Review scores
Source	Rating
Allmusic	3.5/5 stars
ChartAttack	3.5/5 stars
Pitchfork Media	(7.2/10)

Life Like is the fourth album by American indie rock band The Rosebuds. It was released on October 7, 2008, on Merge Records.

The album made #1 on KTUH's charts on the week of October 27, 2008.

== Track listing ==
All tracks are written by Kelly Crisp & Ivan Howard.

No.	Title	Length
1.	"Life Like"	3:18
2.	"Cape Fear"	2:27
3.	"Border Guards"	3:38
4.	"Bow to the Middle"	2:30
5.	"Nice Fox"	3:28
6.	"Another Way In"	3:10
7.	"Concordia Military Club"	4:54
8.	"Hello Darling"	2:13
9.	"Black Hole"	3:49
10.	"In the Backyard"	3:52
