= Sand + Silence =

Studio album by The Rosebuds
- Released: August 5, 2014
- Genre: Indie rock
- Length: 40:17
- Label: Western Vinyl

The Rosebuds chronology
Loud Planes Fly Low (2011)	Sand + Silence (2014)

Sand + Silence is an album by the American band The Rosebuds. Their sixth album, it was released in 2014 on Western Vinyl.

== Track listing ==
No.	Title	Length
1.	"In My Teeth"	4:27
2.	"Sand + Silence"	5:13
3.	"Give Me a Reason"	4:03
4.	"Blue Eyes"	2:48
5.	"Mine Mine"	3:27
6.	"Wait a Minute"	3:48
7.	"Esse Quam Videri"	3:44
8.	"Death of an Old Bike"	3:31
9.	"Looking For"	3:08
10.	"Walking"	1:56
11.	"Tiny Bones"	4:12
