= Heliotropes (band) =

American psychedelic/alternative rock band

- Heliotropes performing in Washington DC, April 2013.

Background information
- Origin: Brooklyn, New York
- Genres: Alternative rock, Psychedelic rock, Stoner rock, Acid rock
- Years active: 2009-2017
- Labels: Manimal Vinyl, Goodnight Records
- Members: Nya Abudu; Richard Thomas; Cici Harrison; Amber Myers; Jessica Numsuwankijkul
- Website: Official page on Facebook

Heliotropes were a psychedelic/alternative rock band from Brooklyn, New York, consisting of Nya Abudu (bass), Cici Harrison (drums), Amber Myers (tambourine, vocals) and Jessica Numsuwankijkul (vocals, guitar). They formed in 2009 when Numsuwankijkul posted an advert on Craigslist to form a band. She was joined by Amber Myers, Cici Harrison, and Nya Abudu later joined the band.

They released their debut single "Ribbons" in 2011, and various digital singles, "Moonlite", "The Dove" and "I Walked With a Zombie", in 2012. They released two tracks called "Psalms" and "Quatto" to promote their debut album. A Constant Sea was released on 18 June 2013, on Manimal Vinyl as a digital download. A limited edition run of vinyl copies were released in 2014 on Goodnight Records.

== History ==
=== 2009-2012: Formation and record deal ===
Heliotropes formed in 2009 by Jessica Numsuwankijkul and Amber Myers when Numsuwankijkul posted an advert on Craigslist, initially trying to find musicians to perform Brian Eno-style music, but they found this too hard. They played a show with Astrid Pierce and one of the members, Cici Harrison, eventually joined the band a year later. On the subject, Numsuwankijkul said "I remember being like, “Oh, we wish she was in our band” and then a year later, she was." Nya Abudu answered the advert on Craigslist and the line-up was complete. They began to form their sound, instead of playing Eno-style songs. In 2010, the band self-released an EP titled III. In 2011, they signed to Manimal Vinyl and released their debut single, "Ribbons", on 7" vinyl. In 2012, Heliotropes released various digital singles, "Moonlite", "The Dove" and their cover of Roky Erickson's "I Walked With a Zombie".

=== 2013-present: A Constant Sea ===
In 2013-2012, the band recorded A Constant Sea. They were originally meant to have a song called "A Constant Sea", but they ran out of time to record it. After the recording, they went on their first US tour with Esben and the Witch. The band released a new song titled "Psalms" as a free download on the Rolling Stone website. They later on announced their song "Quatto". Both tracks were to be released on the band's debut album, A Constant Sea. The album was released in June, 2013 as a digital download and later released on vinyl via Goodnight Records.

Spin Magazine gave the album an 8/10, saying "bridges girl-group pop, metallic sludge, shiny psychedelia with woozy flair". Consequence of Sound gave it a 4/5, asserting that the band "show a surprisingly mature and focused control of their formula on A Constant Sea, luring you in only to eat you alive." Bowlegs Music made the album their record of the day saying that "A Constant Sea isn’t the sound of a band that met both only four years ago and in a completely different musical guise. It sounds like a group of long-time friends playing the music that they love, and playing it very well," giving it 8.4 and Allmusic said "Those who make it through the assault of riffs and overall detached feel of much of the record will be treated to obscured gems like "Christine," a near-perfect album closer that revisits moonlit '50s balladry through a Mazzy Star lens," and conclude the record to be "a strongly inventive debut."

== Discography ==
=== Albums ===
Year	Title
2013	A Constant Sea: Released: 18 June 2013; Format: 12" vinyl and Digital Download

=== Singles ===
Year	Title
2011	"Ribbons": Format: 7"; Released: 2011
2012	"Moonlite": Format: Digital Download; Released: 29 May 2012
2012	"The Dove": Format: Digital Download; Released: 11 September 2012
2012	"I Walked With a Zombie": Format: Digital Download; Released: 6 November 2012
