= Tara Beier =

Canadian American singer-songwriter

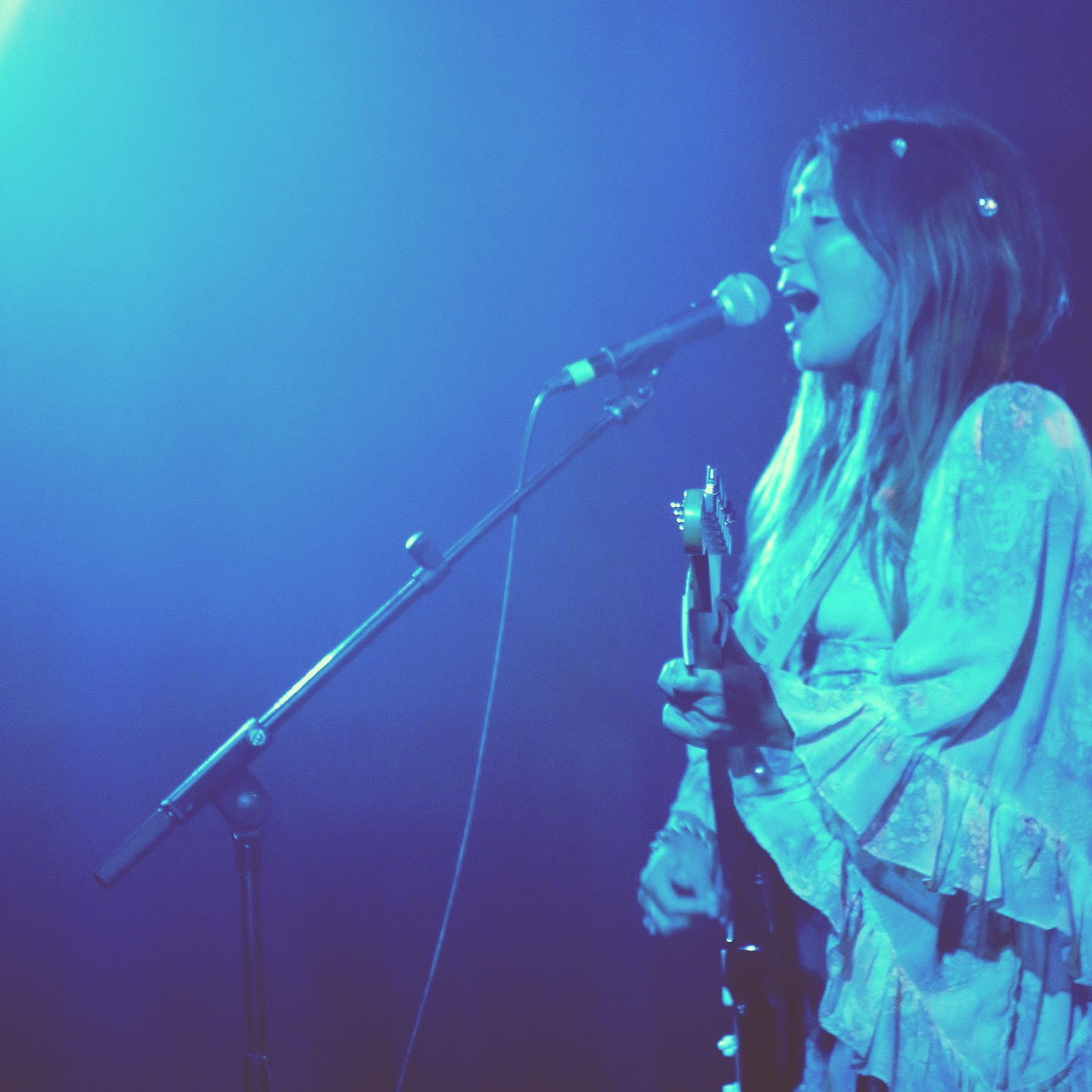

Background information
- Born: Tara Browne; Vancouver, British Columbia, Canada
- Genres: Folk, Alternative, Country, Rock and Pop.
- Occupations: Singer-songwriter and actress.
- Years active: 2007–present
- Labels: Red Raven Records (distributed by Kobalt Music Group); Manimal Vinyl

Tara Beier (née Browne) is a Canadian-American singer-songwriter. Her music has been often described as a blend of folk, alternative, country, and pop.

== Early life ==
Beier was born in Vancouver, British Columbia. Her father is from the Philippines and her mother is Canadian of British, Austrian and Scottish descent. Her great-grandfather was a working pianist in Victoria, Canada.

Throughout her childhood, her family moved often. She attended three different elementary schools and three different high schools. They lived in a horse village for a period of time, where she cultivated a love of animals and nature and became an avid equestrian. She would often sleep in barns to get up early to trail ride. She took horseback riding lessons and would muck barns in exchange for lessons. Her parents eventually separated and later reconciled. She describes her childhood as "difficult and at times confusing," and says that this gave her a great sense of independence from a young age.

She started playing classical piano at the age of 5. Beier attended The Royal Conservatory of Music for over 10 years. She had a very strict piano teacher who later suffered from alcoholism and Tara would sometimes leave her classes crying and in fear. She persevered for the love of music, and has stated, thankful for the strong foundation in music she received due to this experience.

She attended Simon Fraser University, where she earned a Bachelor of Arts in criminology. Her degree granted her an understanding of society and human behavior. She became an advocate for criminal justice and prison reform. Beier originally planned to go into law before embarking on a career in film and music.

Beier has been open about her complex relationship with her father, mentioning years of psychotherapy and the 12-step recovery program of Adult Children of Alcoholics & Dysfunctional Families that helped her reconcile past traumas, including this relationship. Her song "Forgiveness" reflects her journey towards healing.

== Film and television career ==
Beier began her career as a theatre actress and wrote poetry as a hobby. She later pursued a career in filmmaking as a producer and writer. She wrote and produced the documentary I Met A Man From Burma, which told the story of Ler Wah Lo Bo, a Burmese refugee and former revolutionary fighter. She then wrote and performed in a native rights film entitled Covered, a docudrama highlighting a CBC 1966 television interview of Buffy Sainte-Marie.

=== Film festivals and accolades ===
Her film I Met A Man From Burma was accepted into the Vancouver International Film Festival Reel Causes Program, dedicated to addressing global social justice issues. After sending the Canadian immigration minister a copy of the film, Beier was told that the film's subject Ler Wah Lo Bo would be upgraded from refugee status to full Canadian citizenship. In 2014, Beier's film Covered won the Best Experimental category at the ImagineNative Film Festival in Toronto, and was also accepted into the Toronto International Film Festival, Whistler Film Festival and a number of other international film festivals.

== Musical career ==
Playing the role of Buffy Sainte-Marie inspired Beier to focus on music. In 2016 she released her first album, Hero & The Sage’’ produced by Bret Higgins, the bassist of the Great Lake Swimmers. Songs from the album were well-received and got significant air time on radio stations across Canada and the USA. In 2017, Tara self-produced California 1970, a 6 track EP, at The Village (studio) in Los Angeles, with guitarist Adam Zimmon, drummer Tripp Beam, bassist Eliot Lorango, and keyboardist Sasha Smith. Additional vocals for the EP were recorded at the home studio of Guns N' Roses drummer Matt Sorum in Hollywood.

Tara then released a single called "Forgiveness" with Grammy award-winning producer Doug Boehm. She then toured with her band throughout Toronto, Berlin, Los Angeles, San Francisco and New York. The band played at Riverfest in Ontario, Canada alongside MGMT. They have also played at Canadian Music Week, headlined at the Troubadour in West Hollywood, and at the Rockwood Music Hall in New York City.

=== Super Bloom ===
Tara's second album "Super Bloom" was produced by three-time Grammy-nominated musician Ken Coomer, (original founding drummer of Wilco and Uncle Tupelo) in Nashville in 2019 and released on Manimal Vinyl Records in 2020, a Los Angeles-based record label that had previously released debut albums for Yoko Ono, Moby, Duran Duran, Bat for Lashes, Edward Sharpe and the Magnetic Zeros, Carla Bruni, Asia Argento and more. Its premiere was covered by USA Today, and Glamour Magazine featured an interview with Beier about the single, "Hopeless Romantic."”

=== Biden's Nurses Campaign ===
Tara's song "Hero & The Sage" off her debut album was selected to back President Joe Biden's Nurses Campaign during the Presidential Inauguration in 2021. The campaign video is of nurses across the United States who pledge to wear masks for 100 days and ask the public to do the same to fight COVID-19.

In July 2021, Beier commemorated her twin pregnancy with a semi-nude photoshoot on the cover of life-fashion journal Harpers Bazaar.

In 2022, Beier released "Her Story," a covers album paying homage to female artists of the 1960s and 1970s. The album, produced by Sara Emily and Danny Berrios, features covers of songs by Joni Mitchell, Sybille Baier, Joan Baez, and Barbara Keith.

Among the notable performances from this album was Beier's rendition of Joni Mitchell's "California," which she performed live on the television show "Daytime Chicago" on WGNTV.

Her life and music have been discussed in American Songwriter, ET Canada, GQ, the New York Times, Harper Bazaar and NBC news. She has also appeared on the cover of LaPalme Magazine, British Thoughts Magazine and Contrast Magazine, among others. She has appeared in interviews in television shows such as Bloom NBC, Spectrum News, Jason Carter, and Chicago Daytime, WGN-TV.

== Discography ==
=== Albums ===
- Hero & The Sage (2016)
- Super Bloom (2020)
- Her Story (2022)

=== Singles and EPs ===
- California 1970 (2017)
- Forgiveness (2017)
- Doctor Brown (2018)
- Flying Saucer (2019)
- Caged Man (2020)
- Free Yourself (2021)
- Do You Hear What I Hear (2021)
- Freedom Island' (2022)

== Personal life ==
While working on a Nivea television commercial, Tara met Dennis Beier, a commercial film producer. The two married and currently reside in Los Angeles, California and Joshua Tree, CA and have previously resided in Hamburg, Berlin, and Toronto. Tara and Dennis are parents to twin sons, Austin and River, born in 2021 via in vitro fertilization (IVF). Tara has openly discussed her IVF journey, including in an interview with Harper's Bazaar Vietnam aiming to inspire and support women facing fertility challenges and to celebrate femininity and motherhood.

Beier is an advocate for environmental conservation, emphasizing the reduction of plastic waste. She often conveys this message through her active presence on social media platforms, especially Instagram.

== See also ==
- Angel Olsen
- Neko Case
- Sharon Van Etten
- Laura Marling
- Kyrie Kristmanson
