= Night of the Furies =

Studio album by The Rosebuds
- Released: April 10, 2007
- Genre: Indie rock
- Length: 38:30
- Label: Merge Records MRG294

The Rosebuds chronology
Birds Make Good Neighbors (2005)	Night of the Furies (2007)	Life Like (2008)

Night of the Furies is The Rosebuds' third album, released April 10, 2007 on Merge Records.

== Reception ==
Professional ratings
Review scores
Source	Rating
AllMusic	4/5 stars
The A.V. Club	B
Pitchfork Media	7.7/10

The A.V. Club's Noel Murray gave the album a 'B' rating, and drew comparisons to the 1980s work of Echo & the Bunnymen, OMD, Haircut 100, the Human League and Leonard Cohen. He noted an "emphasis on repetition and texture", stating that "while the songs rarely tell a direct story, recurring images of water and sleep express the idea of natural and supernatural forces conspiring to bend one man's will."

== Track listing ==
1. "My Punishment for Fighting"
2. "Cemetery Lawns"
3. "I Better Run"
4. "Get Up Get Out"
5. "Silence by the Lakeside"
6. "Hold on to This Coat"
7. "Silja Line"
8. "When the Lights Went Dim"
9. "Night of the Furies"
