= Buck's Rock =

Summer camp in Connecticut, United States

Coordinates: 41.5911°N 73.3952°W

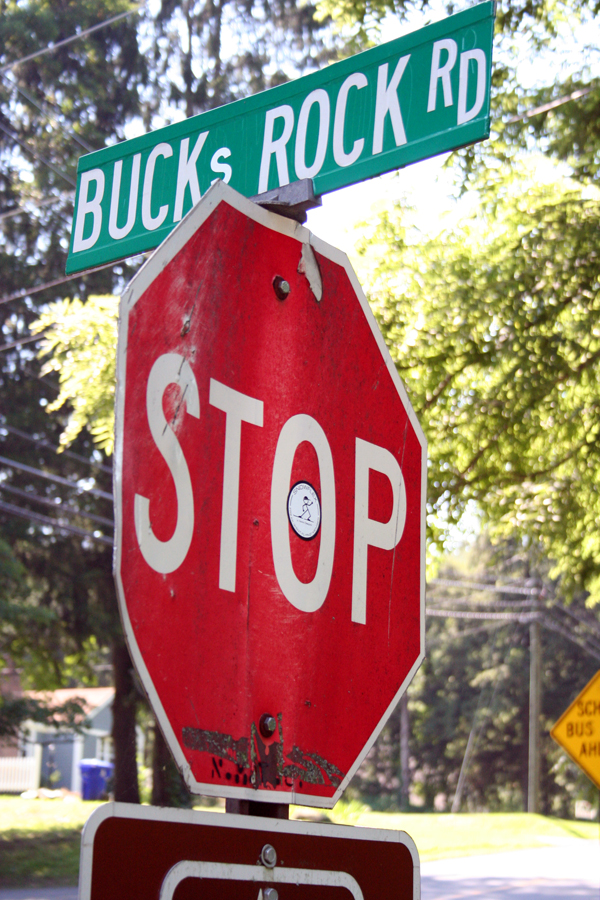
Buck's Rock Road

Buck's Rock Performing and Creative Arts Camp is an educational summer camp located in New Milford, Connecticut. The camp was established in 1942 by Dr. Ernst Bulova and his wife Ilse, Austrian educators who had studied under Maria Montessori. It was originally called Buck's Rock Work Camp.

== Later history ==
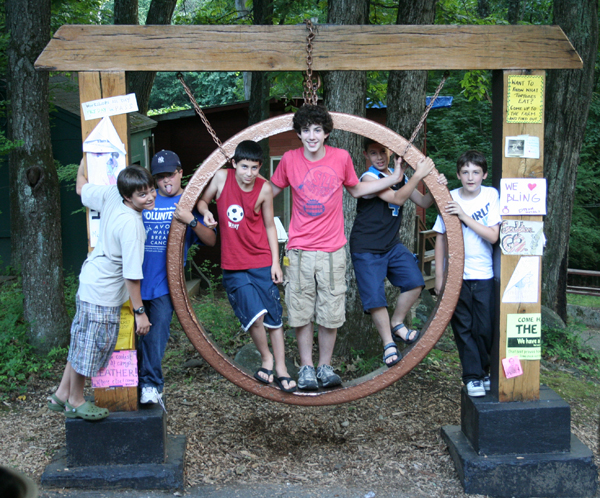
Campers hang out on the Gong

In 2015, the camp was purchased by Noah Salzman, a former camper, from Mickey and Laura Morris. In 2020, the camp was sold and has become a not-for-profit camp, with alumna Antonia Steinberg serving as President of the board. Former camper and counselor Scott Kraiterman serves as the camp's current director.

== Notable staff and alumni ==
- Ben Cohen, co-founder of Ben & Jerry's
- Paz de la Huerta, actor
- Rebecca Drysdale, comedian and writer
- Sadie Dupuis, guitarist and singer in rock band Speedy Ortiz
- Molly Jong-Fast, writer, journalist
- Myq Kaplan, standup comedian
- Elle King, singer and musician
- Ezra Koenig, frontman and singer of indie rock band Vampire Weekend
- Mattie Lubchansky, cartoonist and illustrator
- Matt McGorry, actor in Orange is the New Black.
- Ezra Miller, actor in The Perks of Being a Wallflower, Fantastic Beasts and Where to Find Them, and as The Flash in Warner Bros' Justice League
- Griffin Newman, actor on The Tick and Search Party
- Lionel Shriver, novelist
- Jason Zimbler, former child actor (Clarissa Explains It All)
