= We Were So Turned On: A Tribute to David Bowie =

We Were So Turned On

Compilation album by Various Artists
- Released: September 14, 2010
- Genre: Rock, glam rock, art rock
- Label: Manimal Vinyl

Professional ratings
Review scores
Source	Rating
Uncut	4/5 stars

We Were So Turned On: A Tribute to David Bowie is a David Bowie tribute album released worldwide on September 6, 2010, by Manimal Vinyl as a charity for War Child UK. The album features contributions from Duran Duran, Carla Bruni, Mick Karn, John Frusciante, Warpaint, Devendra Banhart, Vivian Girls, Edward Sharpe and the Magnetic Zeros, A Place to Bury Strangers and others.

The project was started in early 2008 by Manimal Vinyl's founder Paul Beahan. The album was originally planned to feature contributions from Radiohead, Nine Inch Nails and MGMT, who all pulled out due to recording and scheduling conflicts.

The cover artwork was created by Los Angeles–based artist owleyes and the inside artwork was created by artist and musician Nico Turner. The cover includes three images of the inside artwork from the gatefold edition of the album Aladdin Sane filled with psychedelic graphics. The label released A Place to Bury Strangers' cover of "Suffragette City" on the music blog Cover Me one week before the album. Xu Xu Fang's "China Girl" video reached number 1 on Cover Me Songs 2010 Year-end Best of list.

== Track listing ==
=== Disc one ===
1. "Space Oddity" (by Exitmusic)
2. "Boys Keep Swinging" (by Duran Duran)
3. "Sound and Vision" (by Megapuss and Devendra Banhart)
4. "Ashes to Ashes" (by Warpaint)
5. "Be My Wife" (by Corridor)
6. "Always Crashing in the Same Car" (by Chairlift)
7. "John, I'm Only Dancing" (by Vivian Girls)
8. "Fame" (by All Leather)
9. "I'm Afraid of Americans" (by We Are the World)
10. "Suffragette City" (by A Place to Bury Strangers)
11. "Repetition" (by Tearist)
12. "Look Back in Anger" (by Halloween Swim Team)
13. "Fashion" (by Afghan Raiders)
14. "Theme from Cat People" (by Polyamorous Affair)
15. "Red Money" (by Swahili Blonde feat. John Frusciante)
16. "I'm Deranged" (by Jessica 6, ex-Hercules and Love Affair)
17. "African Night Flight" (by Aska + Bobby Evans feat. Moon & Moon)
18. "China Girl" (by Xu Xu Fang)

=== Disc two ===
1. "Heroes" (by VOICEsVOICEs)
2. "Absolute Beginners" (by Carla Bruni)
3. "Blue Jean" (by Papercranes)
4. "Life on Mars?" (by Keren Ann)
5. "Changes" (by Lewis & Clarke)
6. "It Ain't Easy" (by ZAZA)
7. "Soul Love" (by Genuflex)
8. "The Bewlay Brothers" (by Sister Crayon)
9. "Art Decade" (by Marco Benevento)
10. "Ashes to Ashes" (by Mick Karn)
11. "As the World Falls Down" (by Lights (NYC))
12. "The Supermen" (by Aquaserge)
13. "Starman" (by Caroline Weeks)
14. "Quicksand" (by Rainbow Arabia)
15. "Sound and Vision" (by Mechanical Bride)
16. "Memory of a Free Festival" (by Edward Sharpe and the Magnetic Zeros)

=== iTunes Special Edition tracks ===
1. "Heathen (The Rays)" (by Universe)
2. "Letter to Hermione" (by Viv Albertine)
3. "Ziggy Stardust" (by Ariana Delawari)
4. "Oh You Pretty Things" (by Gangi)
5. "The Man Who Sold the World" (by Amanda Jo Williams)
6. "Within You" (by Laco$te)
7. "The Secret Life of Arabia" (by St. Clair Board)
8. "Modern Love" (by Pizza!)

== Critical reception ==
The Warpaint cover of Ashes to Ashes was well-received, appearing on NPR's "5 best cover songs of 2010" and RadioX's "The 10 best David Bowie cover versions".

NME described the album as "a mismatch of a record, skipping frantically between genres with every turn", while The Complete David Bowie called it "exhaustive and occasionally exhausting".
