= The Rosebuds Unwind =

EP by The Rosebuds
- Released: April 22, 2005
- Recorded: December 2004 at Pox World Empire Studio in Durham, North Carolina
- Genre: Indie
- Label: Merge

The Rosebuds chronology
The Rosebuds Make Out (2003)	The Rosebuds Unwind (2005)	Birds Make Good Neighbors (2005)

Professional ratings
Review scores
Source	Rating
Pitchfork Media	7.0/10

The Rosebuds Unwind is the Rosebuds' first EP, released in 2003.

== Track listing ==
1. "You Better Get Ready"
2. "El Camino"
3. "Is There Room?"
4. "Unwind"
5. "Edmund Street"
6. "I'd Feel Better"

== Personnel ==
- Kelly Crisp – Stieff piano, keyboards, Fender Rhodes, bass keys, bass guitar, lap steel, shakers, vocals
- Ivan Howard – guitars, Stieff piano
- Wes Phillips- drums
- Billy Alphin – drums, extra vocals on "I'd Feel Better"
