= Soltero (musician) =

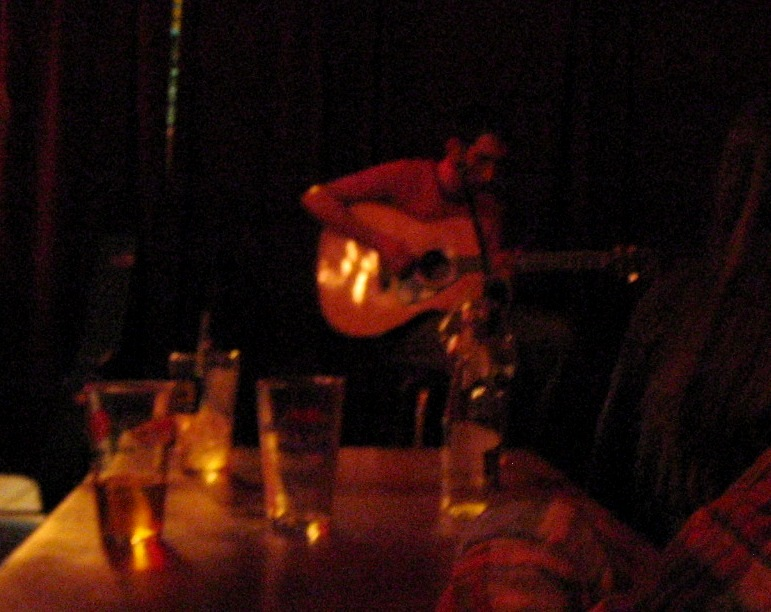
- Soltero solo show, September, 2004

Background information
- Origin: Boston, Massachusetts, U.S.
- Years active: 2001–present
- Label: Microcultures
- Members: Tim Howard, Patti Vacek, Ludwig Kreuzer
- Past members: Alex Drum, Casey Keenan, Ben Macri, Alex McGregor, Tom Hummel, Rob Johanson, Tyler Gibbons, Steve Ellis
- Website: www.facebook.com/soltero

Soltero is a band originally from Boston, and now based in Berlin, Germany.

== Production history ==
Soltero is fronted by songwriter Tim Howard. The project has had several incarnations, including a five-piece band (with trumpet and Rhodes piano) and a four-piece band, as well as solo and duo acoustic lineups. The first full-length Soltero album, entitled Science Will Figure You Out' was recorded with members of the Mobius Band and self-released in August 2001. April 2003 saw the release of Defrocked and Kicking the Habit on Handsome Records. The Tongues You Have Tied. an album recorded winter 2003/04 on reel-to-reel 8-track, was put out on Three Ring Records in June 2004. Soltero's 2005 album, Hell Train, was the first to prominently feature Howard's live band of three years. It was first self-released in March, and then released more widely by Three Ring Records in November 2005. Soltero's fifth record, You're No Dream, found Howard returning to the solo recording dynamic of earlier work. Recorded in Philadelphia using an array of borrowed instruments, the album was released in 2008. The band's sixth album, 1943, was recorded at Junxt Studio in Brooklyn and released by French production company Microcultures in late 2011. The following album, Jamming the Gaydar, was recorded at home in Brooklyn, NY, by Howard, and released in 2013. It was then followed by 2017's Western Medicine Blues, also recorded in Brooklyn, and 2025's Staying Alive, the first album since Howard's move to Berlin, which featured bassist Patti Vacek and drummer Ludwig Kreuzer.

== Discography ==
=== Albums ===
- Science Will Figure You Out (2001)
- Defrocked and Kicking the Habit (2003)
- The Tongues You Have Tied (2004)
- Hell Train (2005)
- You're No Dream (2008 on La Société Expéditionnaire in the US and Messie Murders in France)
- 1943 (2012, on Microcultures in Europe, self-released through Bandcamp in the US.)
- Jamming the Gaydar (2013)
- Western Medicine Blues (2017)
- Staying Alive (2025)

=== Collections ===
- Best Hits (self-released, 2013, compiles tracks from Soltero's first six albums)
