= Loud Planes Fly Low =

Studio album by The Rosebuds
- Released: June 14, 2011
- Genre: Indie rock
- Length: 41:20
- Label: Merge

The Rosebuds chronology
Life Like (2008)	Loud Planes Fly Low (2011)	Sand + Silence (2014)

Professional ratings
Review scores
Source	Rating
The A.V. Club	A−
NOW	4/5 stars

Loud Planes Fly Low is the fifth album by the American band The Rosebuds, released in 2011 on Merge Records.

== Track listing ==
No.	Title	Length
1.	"Go Ahead"	4:20
2.	"Limitless Arms"	5:12
3.	"Second Bird of Paradise"	3:29
4.	"Come Visit Me"	4:32
5.	"Without a Focus"	4:06
6.	"Waiting for You"	3:13
7.	"Woods"	4:42
8.	"A Story"	5:05
9.	"Cover Ears"	3:49
10.	"Worthwhile"	2:52
