= The Death of Speedy Ortiz =

Studio album by Speedy Ortiz
- Released: 2011
- Genre: Indie rock, noise pop, alternative rock
- Length: 29:57

Speedy Ortiz chronology
The Death of Speedy Ortiz (2011)	Major Arcana (2013)

The Death of Speedy Ortiz is the first LP by American indie rock band Speedy Ortiz, self-released digitally in 2011 and on cassette in 2012. The LP was recorded during the summer of 2011 as a side-project while lead-singer, guitarist Sadie Dupuis was working at a camp teaching songwriting. It is described as "patchy, sardonic" "bedroom experiments" that show styles ranging from "eerily distorted folk, shambling banjo ditties" to more common associations with a sound reminiscent of underground 1990s indie rock. Dupuis wrote and performed guitar and vocals along with every instrument on the album which included “bass, drums, piano, cello, banjo, sound treatments, etc.” The album sets the precedent for later works, but is notably Lo-fi in comparison as Dupuis self-recorded the entire album.

The album takes its name from a story in the graphic novel series "Love and Rockets" by Jaime and Gilbert Hernandez. The band is named after the titular character who featured in some of the stories.

== Track listing ==
All songs by Speedy Ortiz

No.	Title	Length
1.	"hexxy sadie"	2:48
2.	"cutco"	4:04
3.	"phish phood"	2:06
4.	"kinda blew"	3:35
5.	"ken-ohki"	1:32
6.	"speedy ortiz"	2:36
7.	"hurricane speedy"	3:23
8.	"thank you"	2:59
9.	"frankenweenie"	3:41
10.	"blondie"	3:13
Total length:		29:57
