= Strand of Oaks =

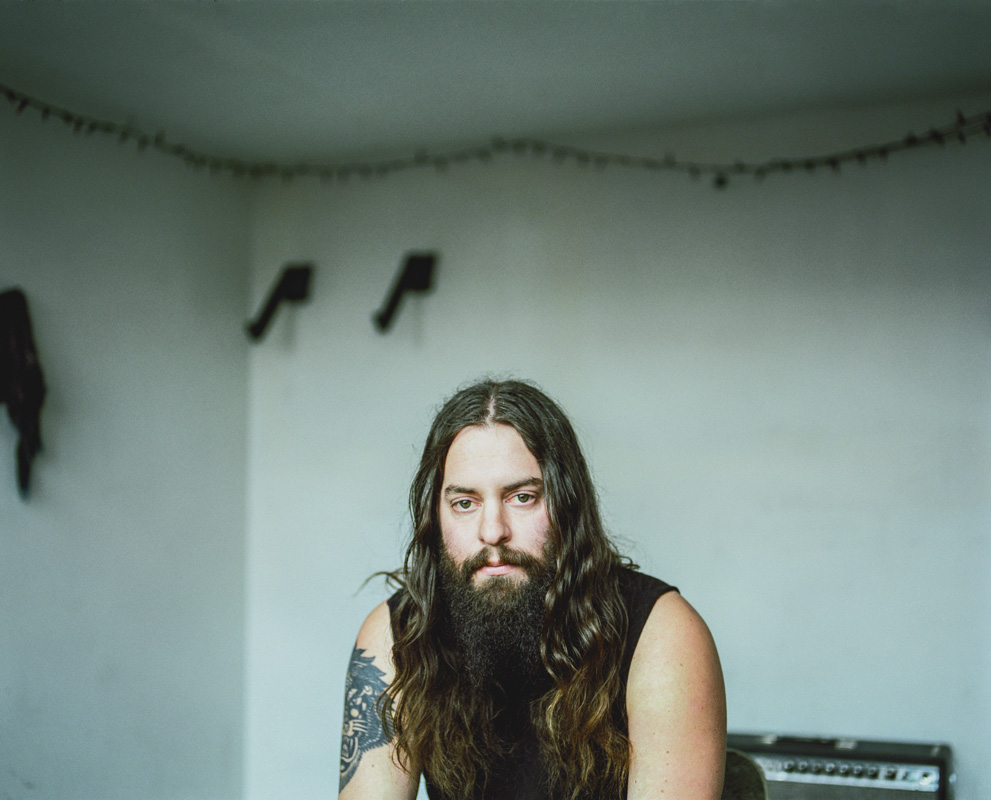

Background information
- Also known as: Strand of Oaks
- Born: Timothy Showalter; July 20, 1982 (age 44); Goshen, Indiana, U.S.
- Genres: Rock; folk rock; folk
- Occupations: Singer, songwriter
- Years active: 2003–present
- Labels: Thirty Tigers; Dead Oceans

Strand of Oaks is the rock project by songwriter and producer Timothy Showalter (born July 20, 1982). Originally from Indiana, he currently resides in Austin, Texas. His music has been classified as rock and folk, as well as folk rock.

Showalter has released eight studio albums—Leave Ruin (2009), Pope Killdragon (2010), Dark Shores (2012), Heal (2014), Hard Love (2017), Eraserland (2019), In Heaven (2021) and Miracle Focus (2024).

== Early life ==
Showalter was born in Goshen, Indiana. In middle school, he took an interest in organized sports and wanted to become a basketball player. Showalter's athletic career ended early because he developed juvenile rheumatoid arthritis; he took an interest in music and began to pursue a career in teaching instead. After high school, Showalter moved from Indiana to Pennsylvania.

== Career ==
While Showalter was on tour, his wife had an affair. He moved back to Wilkes-Barre, Pennsylvania, in 2003. Months later, he came home to find his house burned down. Showalter spent his nights in hotels and on park benches with a borrowed guitar while working at an orthodox Jewish day school. During this time, he continued writing music that would later be released.

=== Leave Ruin (2009) ===
Showalter's first album Leave Ruin was released in 2009 on the Pennsylvania label La Société Expéditionnaire while touring and collaborating with Lou Rogai (Lewis & Clarke).

=== Pope Killdragon (2010) ===
Pope Killdragon is a self-released album by Showalter. The album was produced by audio engineer, Ben Vehorn. While holding onto Strand of Oaks' folky sound, Vehorn added in synthesizers and effects pedals to create an album with a sound that was unexplored territory for Showalter. In between tours, Showalter wrote music for what would become Dark Shores. He recorded this album with John Vanderslice who produced the songs.

Pope Killdragon marked a turn in lyrical and musical style for Strand of Oaks. Its music featured strong synthpop influences, with Showalter explicitly citing Kate Bush and Tangerine Dream as influences on the sound of the album. Lyrically, the album marked a turn to surrealism and fantasy with fewer autobiographical elements than Leave Ruin.

Despite receiving largely positive reviews, including an 8.1 from Pitchfork, and a B on Consequence of Sound, the album sold poorly and received little attention before the release of Heal.

=== Dark Shores (2012) ===
Dark Shores is the second album self-released by Showalter. Stylistically the album represents a turn to a more straightforward rock style; it is the first Strand of Oaks album recorded entirely with a full band. Showalter cited Neil Young as an influence on the style of the album. Lyrically, the album continues themes from Pope Killdragon, with some songs on Dark Shores being direct sequels to songs on Killdragon.

=== Heal (2014) ===
Once Showalter returned from tour, he got to work recording about 30 demos in three weeks. He wrote and recorded songs in his home studio which led to the album, Heal. This was the first album Showalter released on Dead Oceans.

On Christmas Day in 2013, Showalter and his wife Sue were driving back to Philadelphia from Indiana when they hit a patch of ice and crashed into two semi-trucks. Showalter suffered a concussion and broke every rib on his right side. The near-death experience gave Showalter a boldness during mixing sessions while creating Heal with John Congleton, just days after the crash.

Heal received much acclaim, being named one of the best albums released in 2014. Showalter has toured extensively in support of the album and opened for Jason Isbell, Iron and Wine, and Ryan Adams. Strand of Oaks made their television debut in 2014 appearing on Late Night with Seth Meyers.

=== Hard Love (2017) ===
On December 1, 2016, Timothy Showalter announced the fifth album from Strand of Oaks called Hard Love, which was released on February 17, 2017. He also released the first single off the album called "Radio Kids". Strand of Oaks appeared on Last Call with Carson Daly, live at the Troubadour in L.A., first broadcast May 17, 2017.

Hard Love received mixed to positive reviews from critics after its release. Metacritic assigned it a weighted average of 65, indicating "generally favorable reviews". In Pitchfork, Stephen M. Deusner wrote that the album "never really adds up to a particularly clear or bold statement," ultimately assigning it a score of 6.5 out of 10. In a more positive review for The Line of Best Fit, Erik Thompson gave Hard Love a 9 out of 10 and praised its optimistic tone.

On January 19, 2018, Showalter released a follow-up to Hard Love, Harder Love, through Dead Oceans. The project was announced in December 2017, and includes demos, B-sides, and alternative renditions of songs from Hard Love.

=== Eraserland (2019) ===
On March 22, 2019, Strand of Oaks released their sixth album, Eraserland via Dead Oceans. The lead single off the album, "Weird Ways", was released January 15, 2019.

On February 19, 2019, Strand of Oaks released a second single from the album. Called "Ruby", Showalter called it the "happiest song I've ever written."

To promote the release of Eraserland, Showalter (with Jason Isbell, Amanda Shires, My Morning Jacket members Bo Koster and Tom Blankenship, and Will Johnson) appeared on The Late Show with Stephen Colbert and performed "Ruby".

=== In Heaven (2021) ===
On October 1, 2021, Strand of Oaks released their eighth album In Heaven. It was preceded by the single "Galacticana". The record includes contributions from the Smashing Pumpkins' James Iha on the song "Easter".

== Discography ==
=== Albums ===
- Leave Ruin (2009)
- Pope Killdragon (2010)
- Dark Shores (2012)
- Heal (2014)
- Hard Love (2017)
- Eraserland (2019)
- In Heaven (2021)
- Miracle Focus (2024)

=== EPs ===
- Darker Shores (2013)

=== Compilations ===
- Harder Love (2018)

=== Singles ===
| Title | Year | Peak chart positions | Album |
| Title | Year | US AAA | Album |
|---|---|---|---|
| "Maureen's" | 2012 | — | Dark Shores |
| "Spacestations" | 2012 | — | Dark Shores |
| "Shut In" | 2014 | — | Heal |
| "Goshen '97" | 2014 | — | Heal |
| "Radio Kids" | 2017 | 28 | Hard Love |
| "Weird Ways" | 2019 | — | Eraserland |
| "Ruby" | 2019 | 36 | Eraserland |
| "Galacticana" | 2021 | 26 | In Heaven |
"—" denotes a recording that did not chart or was not released in that territory.

== See also ==
- Pat Finnerty
