= Major Arcana (Speedy Ortiz album) =

Studio album by Speedy Ortiz
- Released: July 9, 2013
- Genre: Indie rock, noise pop, alternative rock, grunge
- Length: 34:30
- Label: (United States) Carpark Records
- Producer: Justin Pizzoferrato

Speedy Ortiz chronology
The Death of Speedy Ortiz (2011)	Major Arcana (2013)	Real Hair EP (2014)

Major Arcana is the debut full-length studio album from the indie rock group Speedy Ortiz. It was released on July 9, 2013, by Carpark Records.

== Reception ==
Professional ratings
Aggregate scores
Source	Rating
Metacritic	81/100
Review scores
Source	Rating
Allmusic	3.5/5 stars
The A.V. Club	A-
Consequence of Sound	4/5 stars
Pitchfork Media	(8.4/10)
PopMatters	8/10 stars
Rolling Stone	3/5 stars

Major Arcana has received critical acclaim. The album has a score of 81 out of 100 on the review aggregate site Metacritic, based on 16 reviews.

Pitchfork Media's Lindsay Zoladz gave the album a Best New Album designation, claiming that frontwoman Sadie Dupuis "writ[es] lyrics that are actually worth poring over". David Brusie of The A.V. Club also praised the album, writing "a markedly assured debut, one that makes Speedy Ortiz an act to watch". Consequence of Sound's Katherine Flynn called the album "strong, punchy musical concentrate". Robin Smith of PopMatters described "its angular, moody ‘90s feel conjures the image of an overgrown punk hanging around a playground at night, drinking, smoking, wasting".

Pitchfork Media ranked Major Arcana #48 on its list of the top 50 albums of 2013, writing: "Speedy Ortiz strains the strangled chords and corkscrew interplay of 90s guitar heroes [...] into jaggedly axed anthem". The album was listed 31st on Stereogum's list of top 50 albums of 2013.

The song "No Below" was featured in the 2017 Square Enix/Deck Nine game Life Is Strange: Before the Storm.

== Track listing ==
All songs by Speedy Ortiz.

No.	Title	Length
1.	"Pioneer Spine"	3:37
2.	"Tiger Tank"	2:46
3.	"Hitch"	2:35
4.	"Casper (1995)"	2:48
5.	"No Below"	3:44
6.	"Gary"	3:26
7.	"Fun"	2:05
8.	"Cash Cab"	3:35
9.	"Plough"	2:53
10.	"MKVI"	7:08
Total length:		34:30

iTunes bonus track
No.	Title	Length
11.	"Speedy Ortiz"	2:17

== Charts ==
Chart (2013)	Peak position
US Top Heatseekers (Billboard)	30
