= Goodnight Records =

- Founded: 2004
- Founder: Keith Voglesong; Nathan Jones
- Genre: Indie rock
- Country of origin: U.S.
- Location: Brooklyn, New York
- Official website: www.goodnightrecords.com

Goodnight Records is an independent record label and publishing company based in Williamsburg, Brooklyn. Founded in Atlanta in 2004 by Keith Voglesong and Nathan Jones, Goodnight Records has released records by bands from all over the country and has partnered with larger independent labels such as Merge Records to produce specialty co-releases for their artists.

== Roster ==
- Heliotropes
- The Press
- Askeleton
- Hi Ho Six Shooter
- The Close
- S.I.D.S.
- The Orphins
- The Rosebuds
- Music for People
- Adam Franklin and Bolts of Melody

== Discography ==
- GNR001 - Askeleton Angry Album or Psychic Songs 2004
- GNR002 - The Orphins Drowning Cupid 2004
- GNR003 - The Rosebuds/The Close Rosebuds/Close Split 7" 2004
- GNR004 - Young Vulgarians Nepoleonic Melodrama 2005
- GNR006 - Music For People Audio Diary of the Typical Gemini 2005
- GNR007 - The Press Noxious Saucy Beast 2005
- GNR008 - The Rosebuds Birds Make Good Neighbors 2005
- GNR009 - Askeleton (Happy) Album 2005
- GNR010 - The Press Red Comes Ringin' 7" 2006
- GNR011 - S.I.D.S. My Other Vehicle is a Stretcher 2006
- GNR012 - The Close Sun, Burn 2006
- GNR013 - Hi Ho Six Shooter Empire 2008
- GNR014 - The Press Milk and the Times that Never Were 2008
- GNR015 - The Rosebuds Night of the Furies 2007
- GNR016 - Askeleton The Personalization 2008
- GNR017 - The Press Master 7" 2009
- GNR034 - Adam Franklin & Bolts of Melody Black Horses 2013
