= La Société Expéditionnaire =

- Founded: 2006
- Founder: Lou Rogai
- Distributor: MVD Entertainment
- Country of origin: U.S.
- Location: Pennsylvania
- Official website: www.la-soc.com

La Société Expéditionnaire is a Pennsylvania-based independent record label established in 2006 by Lewis & Clarke's Lou Rogai. On previous Lewis & Clarke albums, the liner notes contained a contact address for "The Expeditionary Society", a nod to the exploratory reference of Lewis & Clarke. This phrase was also taped to the door of Rogai's studio in Delaware Water Gap, Pennsylvania. An intoxicated French Appalachian Trail through-hiker mistakenly stumbled into the practice room, thinking it was the local hostel, and exclaimed "La Société Expéditionnaire!".

The first official release was a split 7-inch record by Strand of Oaks and Dragon Turtle.

== Mission ==
La Société Expéditionnaire is an independent record label that provides a production, promotion, and distribution framework for musicians and artists. The goal is to uncover and expose the "hidden gems" of wild, fragile and obscure music.

== Artists ==
- Arc in Round
- Matt Bauer
- Martin Bisi
- The Black Swans
- Blessed Feathers
- Jonathan Byerley
- Judson Claiborne
- Cedar Sparks
- Columboid
- Dragon Turtle
- Goodnight Stars Goodnight Air
- Fantastic
- Lenny Kaye
- Daniel Knox
- Laser Background
- Lewis & Clarke
- Moon & Moon
- Mako Sica
- Lou Rogai
- Side Over
- Soars
- Soltero
- Strand of Oaks
- Joey Sweeney
- Tamarin
- Moris Tepper
- Weatherman
