= The Black Swans =

American indie rock band

- Origin: Columbus, Ohio, United States
- Genres: Blues rock, indie rock, folk rock
- Years active: 2004–present
- Labels: La Société Expéditionnaire; Delmore Recording Society; Bwatue Records; St. Ives/Secretly Canadian; Misra Records
- Members: Jerry DeCicca; Canaan Faulkner; Tyler Evans; Keith Hanlon; Chris Forbes
- Past members: Noel Sayre

The Black Swans are an American indie rock band. Jerry DeCicca (vocals and acoustic guitar) and Noel Sayre (viola and violin) form the core of the band. Their debut, Who Will Walk in the Darkness with You? features Milan Karcic (electric guitar), Matt Surgeson (electric bass, double bass), Joe Peppercorn (piano), and Jovan Karcic (drums). The Sex Brain EP features Canaan Faulkner (bass), Chris Forbes (electric guitar), Keith Hanlon (drums, electric guitar), Sarah Jurcyk (backing vocals), and Horace Roscoe (alto saxophone). Amy Alwood and Cassie Lewis are also listed as group members. The Black Swans have toured America with such notable indie artists as Okkervil River, Magnolia Electric Company and Early Day Miners. Their 2nd full-length album, Change!, was released on November 6, 2007, by La Société Expéditionnaire on CD and LP. It features the same core band of DeCicca, Sayre, Faulkner, Forbes and Hanlon that appeared on Sex Brain, as well as appearances by Peppercorn on piano and Amy Alwood on backing vocals. It was recorded in Forbes' living room by Hanlon and mixed by Hanlon and DeCicca at Gidget Sound in Columbus, Ohio.

Founding member Noel Sayre died of an apparent heart attack on July 3, 2008, aged 37. He had been on life-support since July 1 after almost drowning in a community pool in Wheelersburg, Ohio.

In 2010, The Black Swans regrouped to release a limited edition album entitled Words Are Stupid, a concept record about the fallibility of human communication, for Secretly Canadian's St. Ives imprint. In September 2010, they released a split 45" single with Bonnie 'Prince' Billy dedicated to the late singer-songwriter Larry Jon Wilson with each band contributing a cover of one of his songs.

The Black Swans released their fourth full-length, Don't Blame the Stars, on Misra Records in April 2011. It is a concept album about placing faith in friendships, music, and oneself. It includes spoken word introductions, as it is modeled after Willie Nelson's album Yesterday's Wine. Don't Blame the Stars was recorded months before Noel Sayre's death and includes his final recordings.

There is another Black Swans band, more in the performance art genre, that has been performing since 1985 in San Francisco.

== Discography ==
Albums

- Who Will Walk in the Darkness with You? (2004)
- Change! (2007)
- Words Are Stupid (2010)
- Don't Blame the Stars (2011)
- Occasion for Song (2012)

EPs

- Sex Brain (2006)
