= Weathervane Music =

American non-profit music organisation

- Type: Nonprofit organization
- Founded: 2009
- Founder: Brian McTear; Bill Robertson
- Headquarters: Philadelphia, Pennsylvania, U.S.
- Website: weathervanemusic.org

Weathervane Music is a U.S. 501(c)(3) non-profit organization based in Philadelphia, Pennsylvania.

== Background ==
Weathervane Music was founded in 2009 by record producer Brian McTear and his friend Bill Robertson. In an interview with The Philadelphia Inquirer, McTear stated that it was "created as a community solution to the problem that the music industry could no longer invest in new artists' music".

== Shaking Through ==
One of Weathervane Music's projects is a documentary series called Shaking Through. In each episode, a musician records a new song during the span of 2 days at Miner Street Recordings in Philadelphia, filming videos along the way to show the process of creating the song. Since 2010, the series has featured 10 artists per year.

== Critical response ==
Weathervane Music has received coverage from The Philadelphia Inquirer and Paste. In 2011, Adam Quinn of Tri State Indie wrote that "Weathervane grants musicians the opportunity to create music while maintaining and appropriate standard of living while making a career out of music." Writing for IFC's website in 2011, Grayson Currin described Shaking Through as "one of the very best online music series".

Shaking Through was shortlisted for Best Original Series at the 2012 Vimeo Awards Festival.
