= The Rosebuds =

American indie rock band

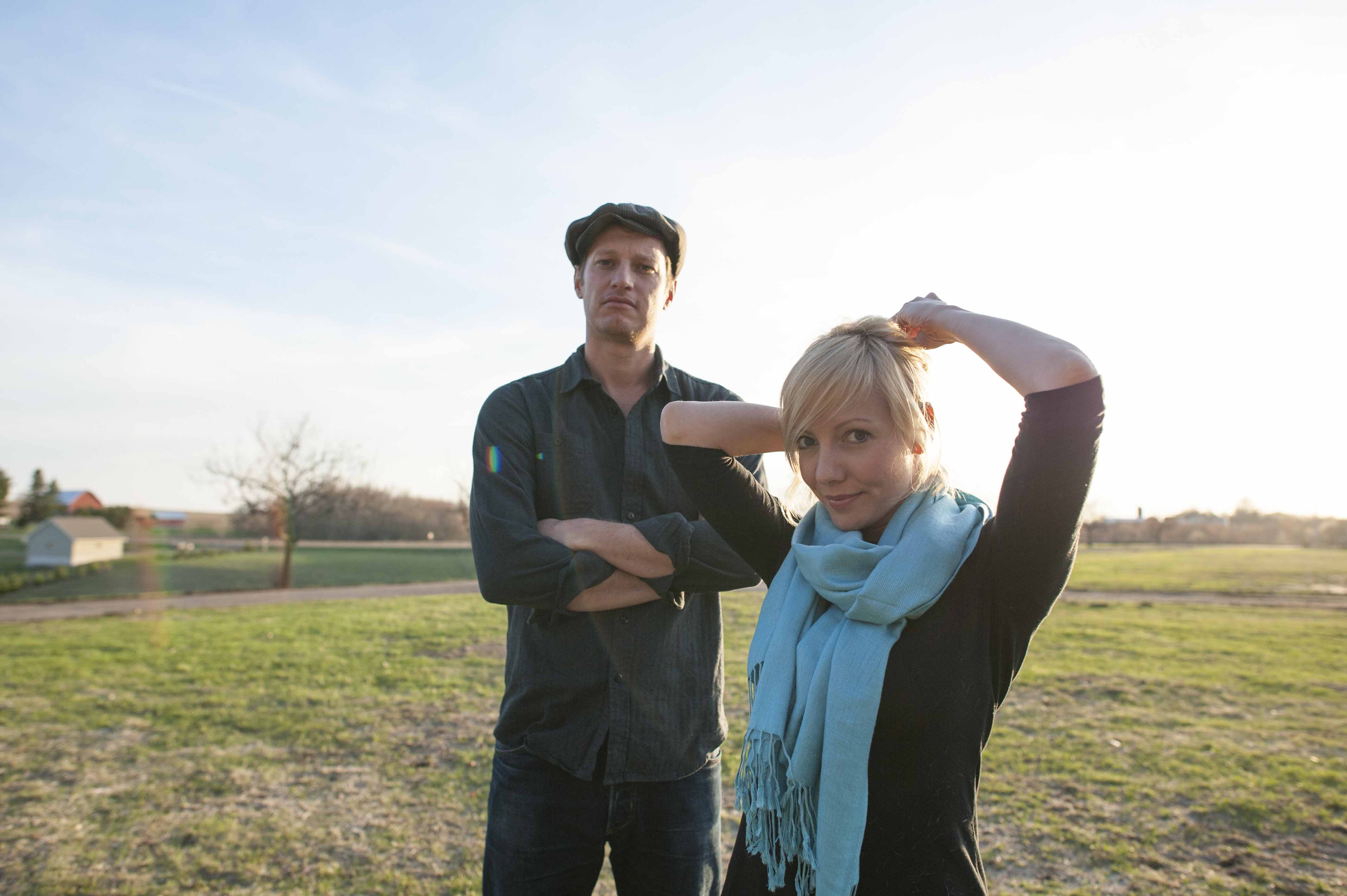
- Ivan Howard and Kelly Crisp

Background information
- Origin: Raleigh, North Carolina
- Genres: Indie rock, folk, dance
- Years active: 2001–2014 (defunct)
- Labels: Western Vinyl, Merge Records, Good Night records, Pidgeon English Records
- Members: Ivan Howard; Kelly Crisp
- Website: defunct, archive only

The Rosebuds were an American indie rock band from Raleigh, North Carolina, that recorded and performed from 2001 to 2014. (Not to be confused with the vocal group of the same name who recorded for George Goldner's Gee Records in the 1950s.) Its core members were Ivan Howard (vocals, guitar, drums, bass, keyboards, programming) and Kelly Crisp (vocals, keyboard, drums, guitar, accordion). Billy Alphin had played drums on the album The Rosebuds Make Out, Wes Phillips played drums on the E.P."Unwind", Lee Waters played drums on the record Birds Make Good Neighbors, and Matt McCaughan played the drums on Night of the Furies, Life Like and Loud Planes Fly Low. Rob Lackey was behind the drum kit during the taping of The Rosebuds Live at the Cats Cradle, a charity only recording sold at cytunes.org to help fight for the prevention of cancer, as well as on the track "Second Birds of Paradise" on "Loud Planes Fly Low."

Howard and Crisp met while in college in Wilmington, North Carolina, where they formed the Rosebuds and enlisting original drummer Jonathan Bass. Afterward, they moved to nearby Raleigh and joined with drummer Billy Alphin of the band Ashley Stove. Merge Records discovered their demo in early 2003 and released The Rosebuds Make Out as a full-length debut album that October.

Following that recording, Alphin left the group and was replaced by Jonathan Bass for their 2003 touring schedule. The Rosebuds Unwind, an EP with six songs, was released in April 2005, followed by Birds Make Good Neighbors in September. The Rosebuds are now joined by Logan Matheny and Matt McCaughan, and Rob Lackey on drums for shows and tours. Their third album, Night of the Furies, was released in April 2007. A fourth full-length, Life Like, was released in October 2008.

In 2007, The Rosebuds covered the Pixies' "Break My Body" for the American Laundromat Records compilation "Dig for Fire - a tribute to PIXIES". Bands OK Go, They Might Be Giants, and British Sea Power also contributed to the project.

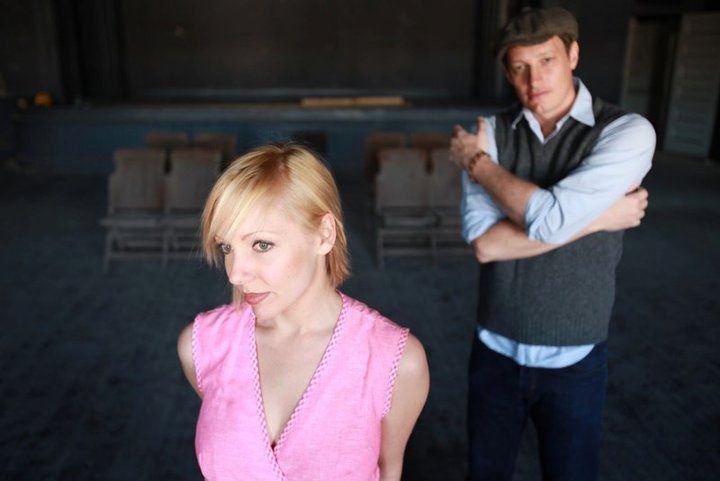
The Rosebuds in 2012.

In 2008, the band again covered a song for American Laundromat Records. This time it was The Cure's "The Walk" for Just Like Heaven - a tribute to The Cure. The Wedding Present, Dean & Britta, The Brunettes, and The Submarines also contributed to the project. Lead singer Ivan Howard joined GAYNGS, a super-group, to record and tour in 2010. The Rosebuds released their fifth full-length record, "Loud Planes Fly Low" on Merge on June 7, 2011. Their 2011 summer tour lineup included Logan Matheny from Roman Candle on drums and Daniel Hart on violin. Support for the first half of the tour was Other Lives, followed by dates with Bon Iver. In 2012 the band returned with two self-released albums; "Christmas Tree Island", an album of 13 original Christmas songs, and "Love Deluxe - The Rosebuds perform Sade". A song by song re-recording of Sade's masterpiece "Love Deluxe" in honor of its 20th anniversary. A tour to support "Love Deluxe" took place in September 2013 and featured Brian Weeks on guitar, Matt Douglas on sax, Jonathon Yu on synths, Mark Paulson on bass and Rob Lackey on drums.

In August 2014, the band released their latest album, Sand + Silence, on the Western Vinyl label. The band has been on hiatus since the end of 2014 as Howard has embarked on a solo career on the West Coast, while Crisp works as a writer on the East Coast.

== Discography ==
=== Albums ===
- The Rosebuds Make Out (LP) (Pidgeon English Records)
- Birds Make Good Neighbors (LP) (Goodnight Records) (September 13, 2005)
- Night of the Furies (LP) (Goodnight Records) (April 10, 2007)
- Sweet Beats, Troubled Sleep (Free Digital LP on Merge Records) (April 10, 2008)
- Life Like (CD/LP) (Merge Records) (October 7, 2008)
- The Rosebuds Live at the Cats Cradle www.cytunes.org Digital only recording (December 12, 2008)
- Loud Planes Fly Low (CD/LP) (Merge Records) (June 7, 2011)
- Love Deluxe(The Rosebuds perform Sade) (Free Digital LP) (November 16, 2012)
- Christmas Tree Island (The Rosebuds) (Nov 20, 2012)
- Sand + Silence (CD/LP) (Western Vinyl) (August 5, 2014)

=== Singles and EPs ===
- The Rosebuds - Whisper (Single) (Self Released) (Oct 31, 2013)
- The Rosebuds - Where the Freaks Hang Out (Single) (Self Released) (Oct 31, 2013)
- The Rosebuds - Brad Cook is Not Your Man (Single) (I Hear Now, Triangle Music Compilation) (July, 2010)
- The Rosebuds - 4track Love Songs (EP) (Self Released) (May 28, 2002)
- The Rosebuds Unwind (EP) (Merge Records) (April 22, 2005)
- The Rosebuds vs. Utah! (split 7-inch) (Pidgeon English Records)
- The Rosebuds vs. The Close (split 7-inch) (Goodnight Records)
- Happily Ever After (previously unreleased song found on Old Enough to Know Better: 15 years of Merge Records) (Merge Records)
