= Foil Deer =

Studio album by Speedy Ortiz
- Released: April 21, 2015
- Length: 41:30
- Label: Carpark

Speedy Ortiz chronology
| Real Hair (2014) | Foil Deer (2015) | Twerp Verse (2018) |

Foil Deer is the second studio album by Boston, Massachusetts indie rock band, Speedy Ortiz. The album was released by Carpark Records on April 21, 2015.

== Critical reception ==
Foil Deer received generally favorable reviews from critics; on Metacritic, it has a score of 83 out of 100, indicating "universal acclaim".

Professional ratings
Aggregate scores
| Source | Rating |
|---|---|
| Metacritic | 83/100 |
Review scores
| Source | Rating |
| AllMusic | 4/5 stars |
| The A.V. Club | B |
| Consequence of Sound | B+ |
| The Guardian | 3/5 stars |
| Pitchfork | 7.9/10 |
| PopMatters | 8/10 stars |
| Rolling Stone | 3.5/5 stars |
| Spin | 7/10 |
| Vice (Expert Witness) | A– |

== Accolades ==
| Publication | Accolade | Year | Rank | Ref. |
|---|---|---|---|---|
| Stereogum | The 50 Best Albums of 2015 | 2015 | 44 | |

== Track listing ==
| No. | Title | Length |
|---|---|---|
| 1. | "Good Neck" | 1:36 |
| 2. | "Raising the Skate" | 4:14 |
| 3. | "The Graduates" | 3:57 |
| 4. | "Dot X" | 3:38 |
| 5. | "Homonovus" | 3:18 |
| 6. | "Puffer" | 2:46 |
| 7. | "Swell Content" | 1:48 |
| 8. | "Zig" | 4:32 |
| 9. | "My Dead Girl" | 4:22 |
| 10. | "Ginger" | 2:38 |
| 11. | "Mister Difficult" | 3:36 |
| 12. | "Dvrk Wvrld" | 4:41 |
| Total length: | | 41:00 |
