= Who Will Walk in the Darkness with You? =

Studio album by The Black Swans
- Released: November 9, 2004
- Genre: Folk rock
- Length: 43:52
- Label: Delmore Recording Society
- Producer: Jon Chinn

The Black Swans chronology
Who Will Walk in the Darkness with You? (2004)	Sex Brain (EP) (2006)

Professional ratings
Review scores
Source	Rating
AllMusic	3.5/5 stars

Who Will Walk in the Darkness with You? is the debut album by folk-rock group The Black Swans.

== Track listing ==
All tracks are written by Jerry DeCicca.

No.	Title	Length
1.	"Who Will Walk in the Darkness With You?"	4:34
2.	"Blue Skies"	4:31
3.	"Honest Eyes"	3:34
4.	"Song Without You"	3:58
5.	"The Raft"	3:47
6.	"Hours Never End"	6:33
7.	"Black Swan Blues"	5:19
8.	"Days Are Long"	4:25
9.	"Rocks in My Shoes"	4:15
10.	"Bring You Down"	2:56
Total length:		43:52
