= Manimal Vinyl =

American record label

- Parent company: Manimal Group
- Founded: 2006
- Founder: Paul Gebser Beahan
- Distributors: Universal Music Group, Warner Music Group
- Genre: Experimental, psychedelic and electronic music
- Country of origin: United States
- Location: Malibu, California

Manimal Vinyl is a Los Angeles–based record label founded in 2006 by film/TV producer, composer and former fashion editor Paul Gebser-Beahan.

== History ==
The label was started out of Beahan's living room in late 2006 in the historical Hancock Park neighborhood in central Hollywood. They released debut albums from Bat for Lashes, Warpaint and many other exclusive releases from avant-garde pop artists ranging from Yoko Ono, Moby, Duran Duran, Carla Bruni, IC3PEAK, Edward Sharpe & the Magnetic Zeros, Devendra Banhart, Asia Argento, Eyedress and more. Manimal has created tribute albums to Madonna, The Cure, David Bowie and Duran Duran with the tributees involvement.

In 2008, 2009 and 2010, Manimal hosted three medium scale music festivals in Joshua Tree, California at the Pappy & Harriet's venue. Line-ups mostly included the labels artists, alumni and friends.

In 2012, Manimal created a distribution, marketing and publicity branch and has non-exclusively partnered on campaigns with The Orchard, Warner Bros. Records and ATP.

The label maintains its focus on a large back catalog of music but has paused on new signings as of 2022. The label also does film distribution and curates live events. Its headquarters are split between Calabasas and Malibu, California. In 2023, it was announced that Beahan launched the new company called Heroes Music. The company acts as a family office for music rights, master recordings, publishing and name image likeness. As a creative consultant, Beahan also headed collaborations between Bat for Lashes and Scott Walker (singer) along with Duran Duran and John Frusciante of Red Hot Chili Peppers.

== Discography ==
- Chapin Sisters and Winter Flowers split LP (MANI-001) released as a limited picture disc April 2007
- Bat For Lashes, Fur and Gold vinyl LP (MANI-002) Limited Edition with poster June 2007, additional pressings in 2009 and 2013.
- Through the Wilderness a tribute to Madonna CD (MANI-003) November 2007 (feat. Lavender Diamond, Ariel Pink's Haunted Graffiti, etc.)
- Apollo Heights, White Music For Black People CD (MANI-005) October 2007
- Magick Daggers, Black Diamonds CD-EP (MANI-006) October 2007
- Hecuba, Sir 12-inch EP/ CD-EP (MANI-008) April 2008
- Caroline Weeks, Songs For Edna LP/CD (MANI-004) March 17, 2009 Bat For Lashes solo project
- Aquaserge, Tahiti Coco 12-inch EP/ CD-EP (MANI-009) Sept 2nd, 2008
- Rainbow Arabia, The Basta CD-EP (MANI-007 Tiny Man/Manimal Vinyl) August 2008
- Rio en Medio, Frontier LP (MANI-012) October 4, 2008
- Perfect As Cats, a tribute to The Cure 2×CD (MANI-013) October 28, 2008 (feat. Bat for Lashes, The Dandy Warhols, Kaki King, etc.)
- Alexandra Hope, Invisible Sunday LP/CD (MANI-010) March 17, 2009
- Corridor, s/t LP (MANI-011) May 25, 2009
- Hecuba, Paradise CD/LP (MANI-014) May 25, 2009
- Rainbow Arabia, Kabukimono 12-inch EP/CD (MANI-016) July 28, 2009
- Voices Voices, Origins EP/12" (Remixed and Produced by Prefuse 73) Jan 26th, 2010
- Warpaint, Exquisite Corpse EP/12" October 5, 2009
- We Are The World, Clay Stones LP/CD April 6, 2010
- ASKA, There Are Many of Us 7-inch single (theme from Spike Jonze's film I'm Here) Spring 2010
- We Were So Turned On, a tribute to David Bowie LP/CD September 6, 2010 (featuring contributions from Duran Duran, Devendra Banhart, Carla Bruni, Edward Sharpe & the Magnetic Zeros, Vivian Girls, Chairlift, A Place to Bury Strangers and more) All profits go to War Child UK.
- Sister Crayon, Bellow LP/CD February 2011
- Swahili Blonde, Man Meat LP/CD July 29, 2010, Nicole Turley project
- papercranes, Let's Make Babies in the Woods CD/LP January 24, 2011, Rain Phoenix project
- Juliette Commagere, The Procession CD/LP September 28, 2010
- Sophie Hunger, s/t CD April 2011
- ASKA, s/t CD-EP Winter 2010
- Duran Duran and Carla Bruni, split 7-inch single (David Bowie covers for War Child charity) December 2010
- Warpaint and Sister Crayon, split 7-inch single (David Bowie covers for War Child charity) September 2010
- Baron von Luxxury, The Lovely Theresa single Feb 2011
- Jenny O., Home EP July 2011
- Corridor, Real Late LP August 2011
- papercranes, Long Way 7-inch single Summer 2011
- Dreamtapes, I Disappear 7-inch single Summer 2011
- Cool For School: For the Benefit of The Lunchbox Fund school themed covers record curated by Rain Phoenix featuring tracks from Bright Eyes, First Aid Kit, Jenny O., Jonathan Wilson, Fences and more. Released September 2011
- Extra Classic, Your Light Like White Lightning, Your Light Like A Laserbeam October 2011
- The Child, s/t EP December 2011
- Baron von Luxxury, The Last Seduction LP Feb. 2012
- Cameras, In Your Room LP October 2011
- Chains of Love, Strange Grey Days LP March. 2012
- papercranes, Three LP boxset Nov. 2012
- Heliotropes, The Dove single Summer 2012
- The Holiday Crowd, Over The Bluffs LP Feb. 2013
- K-X-P, II LP February 2013
- Beliefs, Untitled LP March 2013
- AACT RRAISER, Holy Wind Delta Dance LP May 2013
- Heliotropes, A Constant Sea LP June 2013
- Barbarian, City of Women EP August 2013
- Spirit Vine, Ascender LP Sept. 2013
- Chains of Love, Misery Makers vol. 1 EP October 2013
- Shara Gibson, Singapore single December 2013
- Shara Gibson, Man Like You single December 2013
- Verdigrls, Heartbreak Hour EP Feb. 2014
- L.A. WITCH, s/t EP Feb. 2014
- IS/IS, s/t Feb. 2014
- Chains of Love, Misery Makers vol. 2 EP March 2014
- Moby, Rio single (released by Modern Records; curated by MANIMAL) July 2014 (cover of Duran Duran)
- Making Patterns Rhyme, a tribute to Duran Duran for the benefit of Amnesty International feat. Warpaint Soko Moby etc. October 2014
- Moonwalks, EP1 EP December 2014
- Them Things, Astronauts April 2015 (LOOSE)
- Cellars, Lovesick LP June 2015
- Dear Boy, Hesitation Waltz / The Ghost in You (The Psychedelic Furs cover) 7-inch single (Easy Hell/Manimal Vinyl) August 2015
- Moonwalks, Lunar Phases October 2015
- Them Things, Mythomania December 2015 (LOOSE)
- Yoko Ono, Yes, I'm A Witch Too(collaborative and remix LP with Death Cab for Cutie, Miike Snow, Tune-Yards, Penguin Prison, Peter Bjorn and John, Moby, Portugal. The Man, Sparks and more) February 2016
- ATR31 s/t EP June 2016
- Noble Oak, Careless single July 2016
- Matsu Mixu, Volume One LP August 2016
- Eyedress, Where My Girl At? b/w "Sophia Coppola" February 2016
- Dakota, Silver Tongue June 30, 2017
- BLKKATHY Lemon EP January 2017
- Hindu singles April 2018
- Dr Fadeaway GLOW March 2018
- Leo Nite The Slit EP April 2018
- Cellars new EP tba Summer 2019
- A Death Story Called Girl soundtrack to the film by Nathalia Bas-Tzion Beahan December 2018 featuring Liberace
- Essere Amato film soundtrack (featuring John Taylor of Duran Duran, David Scott Stone, Lou Rogai and Paul Beahan. 2019
- Tara Beier Superbloom LP Aug 2020
- Julie Mintz w/ Moby "Purple Rain" single June 2020
- Asia Argento w/ Paul Beahan "Widow" Sept 2020
- Asia Argento Music From My Bed LP March 2021

== See also ==
- List of record labels
