= Laser Background =

American psychedelic pop band

- Origin: Philadelphia, Pennsylvania United States
- Genres: Indie rock; psychedelic pop; dream pop; mutant funk pop; wonky
- Years active: 2012–2020
- Label: Endless Daze
- Members: Andy Molholt
- Website: laserbackground.com

Laser Background was an American psychedelic pop band from Philadelphia, Pennsylvania, United States.

- Andy Molholt – vocals, guitar, keyboard (2012–2020)

== Discography ==
Albums

- Super Future Montage (2013, La Société Expéditionnaire)
- Correct (2016, La Société Expéditionnaire)
- Dark Nuclear Bogs (2017, Endless Daze)
- Evergreen Legend (2020, Amby Moho's Personal Imprint)

EPs

- Laser Background EP (2012, Stroll On Records)
- Kelly Wisdom EP (2015, Endless Daze)
- People Person EP (2018, Endless Daze)
