= Sarah Tudzin =

American musician, sound engineer, and producer

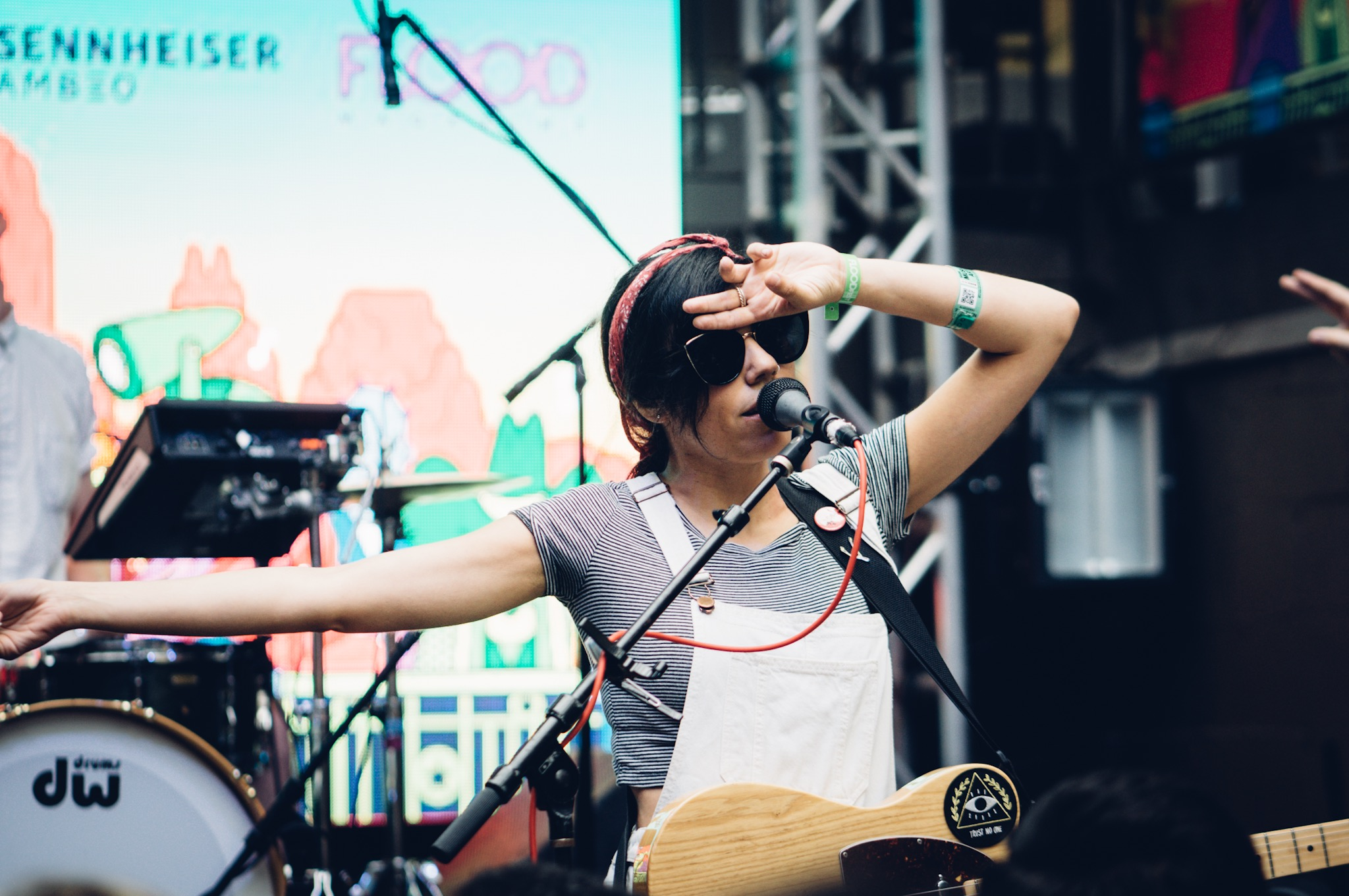
- Tudzin at SXSW in 2019.
- Born: May 11, 1993 (age 33)
- Education: Berklee College of Music
- Occupations: musician; sound engineer; record producer; audio mixer

Sarah Tudzin is an American record producer, audio engineer, and musician. She is also the founder and leader singer of the band Illuminati Hotties. Tudzin releases music on her own imprint label, Snack Shack Tracks, in partnership with Hopeless Records.

Tudzin has produced and engineered records for Boygenius, Weyes Blood, Slowdive, Guppy, and Logic.

== Early life ==
Sarah Tudzin grew up in Woodland Hills, California. As a teen she played drums in school orchestra and jazz ensembles, as well as participated in various bands.

In 2011, she left Southern California for Boston to study at Berklee College of Music, initially focusing on drums. But she quickly grew bored of solo practice and instead switched to the school's music production and engineering program. She graduated from Berklee in 2014 with a B.M. in production/engineering.

== Career ==
Tudzin returned to Los Angeles after graduating, where she started working as a studio runner at a major recording studio. She soon began reaching out to producer contacts, eventually landing a job with indie-rock producer Chris Coady. She spent over three years as his engineer on records for artists such as Amen Dunes, Porches, and Slowdive. Through this experience she developed a strong technical foundation in recording, mixing, drum programming, and production.

In 2017, Tudzin formed her own musical project, Illuminati Hotties, hoping to showcase her broader production and songwriting capacities. The following year, Illuminati Hotties released their debut full-length album, Kiss Yr Frenemies, on Tiny Engines. The album was largely self-produced by Tudzin, recorded in the studio where she had worked as an assistant.

In 2020, after tensions with Tiny Engines, Tudzin worked to regain control over her music. She released a mixtape called Free I.H.: This Is Not the One You’ve Been Waiting For to fulfill her contract obligations, while paving the way for independent work.

In 2021, she launched her own imprint label, Snack Shack Tracks, through a partnership with Hopeless Records. Under this imprint, she released the third album from Illuminati Hotties, Let Me Do One More on October 1, 2021. Let Me Do One More received wide acclaim with Tudzin saying that working as a producer and engineer gave her the confidence to fully realize her own creative vision.

While continuing her work with Illuminati Hotties, Tudzin built a growing resume as a producer and engineer for other artists. She worked on projects by Weyes Blood, Pom Pom Squad, Speedy Ortiz, The Armed, and more. The high point came in 2023, when she contributed engineering and production work to boygenius’ breakout album The Record. That album became a major hit, elevating her profile significantly with multiple Grammy nominations and a win for Best Alternative Music Album.

In 2023, she contributed vocals to “Igyah Kah,” a song for the Star Wars: Ahsoka TV series soundtrack.

On June 5, 2024, she announced a new Illuminati Hotties album called Power, released on August 23 via Hopeless Records.

== Songwriting and production credits ==
Title	Year	Artist(s)	Album	Credits	Written by	Produced with
All songs	2015	!!!	As If	Assistant Engineer	Mario Andreoni, Raphael Cohen, Nic Offer, Paul Quattrone, Daniel Gorman, Allan Wilson, Phil Boyd	Jim Eno, Patrick Ford
All songs	2016	Hamilton: An American Musical	Original Cast Recording	Audio engineer	Arthur Sullivan, Christopher Martin, Clifton "Jiggs" Chase, Diddy, DJ Premier, DMX, Duke Bootee, Easy Mo Bee, Grandmaster Melle Mel, Havoc, James Mtume, Jason Robert Brown, Khary Kimani Turner, Lin-Manuel Miranda, The Notorious B.I.G., Oscar Hammerstein II, Poke, Prodigy, Richard Rodgers, Roger Troutman, Swizz Beatz, Sylvia Robinson, W.S. Gilbert	Alex Lacamoire, Bill Sherman, Black Thought, Lin-Manuel Miranda, Questlove
All songs	2016	Porches	Pool	Engineer	Aaron Maine, Peter Maine	Aaron Maine
All songs	2016	Springtime Carnivore	Midnight Room	Engineer	Tommy English, Greta Morgan	Chris Coady
All songs	2016	Macklemore & Ryan Lewis	This Unruly Mess I’ve Made	Assistant engineer	Anderson .Paak, Andrew Joslyn, Bob Stone, Budo, Buster Harding, Cab Calloway, Cardiak, Carla Morrison, Chance the Rapper, CritaCal, Darian Asplund, DJ Premier, Ed Sheeran, Elan Wright, Eric Nally, Evan Flory-Barnes, Hollis, IDRIS, Jack Palmer, Jake One, Jamila Woods, Josh Dobson, Josh Rawlings, Joshua Rawlings, KRS-One, Leon Bridges, Macklemore, Mike Slap, Owuor Arunga, Ryan Bedard, Ryan Lewis, Stu Phillips, Tim Haggerty, Tommy Swish, Xperience & YG	Budo, Cardiak, CritaCal, Hollis, Jake One, Jamila Woods, Macklemore, Ryan Lewis, Tommy Swish & Xperience
All songs	2017	Together Pangea	Bulls and Roosters	Mix assistant	Danny Bengston & William Keegan	Andrew Schubert
All songs	2017	Black Lips	Satan’s Graffiti or God’s Art?	Mix assistant	Cole Alexander, Jared Swilley, Oakley Munson, Zumi Rosow, Jeff Clarke	Sean Lennon, Oakley Munson, Saul Adamczewski
All songs	2017	Logic	Everybody	Assistant Engineer	Khalil Abdul-Rahman, Sam Barsh, Alan Bergman, Marilyn Bergman, Bobby Campbell, Alessia Caracciolo, Jermaine Cole, Charles Dumazer, Damian Lemar Hudson, Arjun Ivatury, Nima Jahanbin, Paimon Jahanbin, Quincy Jones, Kevin McKenzie, Shawn McKenzie, Paul Mitchell, Dominik Patrzek, Michael Render, Leon Ressalam, Carlton Ridenhour, Khalid Robinson, Daniel Seeff, William Smith, Michi Tanaka, Shuntaro Tanikawa, Thomas Lea, Chris Thornton, Diondria Thornton, Tariq Trotter, Ernest Wilson	6ix, Bobby Campbell, C-Sick, Deats, DJ Khalil, Logic, No I.D., PSTMN, Vontae Thomas, Wallis Lane
All songs	2017	Slowdive	Slowdive	Mixing Assistant	Neil Halstead, Christian Savill, Nick Chaplin, Rachel Goswell, Simon Scott	Neil Halstead
All songs	2018	Mass Gothic	I've Tortured You Long Enough	Mixing Assistant	Noel Heroux, Jessica Zambri	Josh Ascalon
All songs	2018	illuminati hotties	Kiss Yr Frenemies	Producer, Engineer, Composer	Sarah Tudzin, Tim Kmet, Sapphire Jewell, Zach Bilson	Collin Pastore
All songs	2018	Porches	The House	Engineer	Aaron Maine, Peter Maine	Aaron Maine
All songs	2018	Amen Dunes	Freedom	Additional recording	Damon McMahon	Chris Coady
List of Demands (Reparations)	2018	The Kills	Non-album single	Engineer	Saul Williams	Chris Coady
All songs	2019	The Bright Light Social Hour	Jude Vol. I	Assistant engineer	Curtis Roush, Jackie O'Brien, Zac Catanzaro, Mia Carruthers, Juan Alfredo Ríos, Joseph Mirasole, Shreddward	Chris Coady
All songs	2019	Weyes Blood	Titanic Rising	Additional engineer	Natalie Mering	Jonathan Rado, Natalie Mering
Titanic	2019	Dolly Valentine	Non-album single	Producer and Engineer	Dolly Valentine	—N/a
All songs	2019	Goon	Heaven Is Humming	Engineer	Caleb Wicker, Christian Koons, Drew Eccleston, Kenny Becker, Jen Simone	—N/a
All songs	2019	Show Me the Body	Dog Whistle	Engineer	Gabriel Millman, Harlan Steed, Julian Cashwan Pratt, Noah Cohen-Corbett	Chris Coady, Gabriel Millman, Harlan Steed, Julian Cashwan Pratt, Noah Cohen-Corbett
All songs	2020	Cheerleader	Almost Forever	Assistant Engineer	Chris Duran, Joe Haller, Josh Pannepacker	Chris Coady
How to be Good	2020	Dolly Valentine	data-sort-value="" style="background: var(--background-color-interactive, #ececec); color: var(--color-base, inherit); vertical-align: middle; text-align: center; " class="table-na" | Non-album single	Producer, Engineer, Mixer	Ryan Hadlock, Andrew Valenti, Leslie Schott	Ryan Hadlock
All songs	2020	Tim Heidecker	Fear of Death	Engineer	Tim Heidecker, Natalie Mering	Drew Erickson, Tim Heidecker, Natalie Mering, Jonathan Rado
All songs	2020	Sad13	Haunted Painting	Producer, Engineer, Mixer	Sadie Dupuis	—N/a
All songs	2020	illuminati hotties	Free I.H: This Is Not The One You’ve Been Waiting For	Producer, Engineer	Sarah Tudzin	—N/a
We’re So In Tune	2021	Kississippi	Mood Ring	Additional production, Additional engineering	Zoe Allaire Reynolds	Andy D. Park, Marshall Vore, Derek Ted
All songs	2021	illuminati hotties	Let Me Do One More	Producer, Engineer, Composer	Sarah Tudzin	—N/a
All songs	2021	Said the Whale	Dandelion (Deluxe)	Remixing	Ben Worcester, Cayne McKenzie, Jaycelyn Brown, Steve Bays, Tyler Bancroft, Sarah Tudzin	Steve Bays
All songs	2021	Coldplay	Music of the Spheres	Assistant engineer	Amber Strother, Apple Martin, Bill Rahko, Chris Martin, Daniel Green, Davide Rossi, Denise Carite, Derek Dixie, Federico Vindver, Guy Berryman, Jacob Collier, Jesse Rogg, j-hope, John Metcalfe, Jon Hopkins, Jonny Buckland, Livvi Franc, Max Martin, Metro Boomin, Oscar Holter, Paris Strother, Rik Simpson, RM, Sam Sparro, Stephen Fry, SUGA, Will Champion	Bill Rahko, Max Martin, Oscar Holter
All songs	2021	Pom Pom Squad	Death of a Cheerleader	Producer, Mixer, Engineer, Additional keyboard	Dorcas Cochran, Garret Chabot, henhouse!, Lionel Newman, Mia Berrin, Peter Lucia Jr., Shelby Keller, Tommy James	Mia Berrin, Petey Mix
All songs	2022	Lou Roy	Pure Chaos	Producer and Engineer	Lou Roy	Lou Roy
All songs	2022	Erin Anne	Do Your Worst	Mixer	Erin A. Fitzpatrick	Erin A. Fitzpatrick
Aliens	2022	Guppy	Non-album single	Producer, Mixer, Engineer	Guppy	—N/a
All songs	2022	Noah Dillon	Kill the Dove	Additional Vocals, Writer	Noah Dillon, Sarah Tudzin	Andy Lawson
All songs	2022	Eliza McLamb	Salt Circle	Producer, Audio Engineer, Mixer	Eliza McLamb	Sarah Tudzin
All songs	2022	Weyes Blood	And in the Darkness Hearts Aglow	Audio Engineer	Weyes Blood	Jonathan Rado, Rodaidh McDonald, Weyes Blood
All songs	2022	PUP	The Unraveling of PUPTheBand	Additional vocals	Nestor Chumak, Stefan Babcock, Steve Sladkowski, Zack Mykula	Peter Katis, PUP
All Songs	2023	Snow Ellet	Whiskey & Soda Pop	Producer, Engineer, Mixer	Eric Reyes	—N/a
Igyah Kah	2023	Ahsoka Vol. 1	Original Soundtrack	Vocals	Kevin Kiner, Deana Kiner, Ludwig Göransson, Noah Gorelick	Kevin Kiner
All songs	2023	Sir Chloe	I Am the Dog	Writer	Dana Foote, Sarah Tudzin, John Congleton, Teddy Geiger, Teddy O'Mara	John Congleton
All songs	2023	The Armed	Perfect Saviors	Additional vocals, Additional engineering	Dan Greene, Kenneth Szymanski, Randall Kupfer, Tony Wolski	Ben Chisholm, Justin Meldal-Johnsen, Tony Wolski, Troy Van Leeuwen
All songs	2023	Speedy Ortiz	Rabbit Rabbit	Producer, Engineer, Mixer	Sadie Dupuis, Sarah Elizabeth Dupuis	Sarah Tudzin, Sadie Dupuis, Speedy Ortiz
All songs	2023	Boygenius	The Record	Producer, Engineer	Julien Baker, Phoebe Bridgers, Lucy Dacus	boygenius, Catherine Marks, Ethan Gruska, Melina Duterte, Tony Berg
All songs	2024	Kississippi	Damned If I Do It For You	Writer, Additional Production	Zoe Allaire Reynolds, Sarah Tudzin, Maddie Ross, Dan Campbell	Andy D. Park
All songs	2024	Nitefire	Ameripop	Writer, Mixer	Nico Geyer	Jonathan Rado
All songs	2024	Chokecherry	Messy Star	Producer, Engineer	Abri Crocitto, Izzie Clark, Scarlett Elizabeth, Zach Tuch	Zach Tuch, Sarah Tudzin
All songs	2024	Odetta Hartman	Swansongs	Mixer	Odetta Hartman	Alex Friedman, Odetta Hartman, Wyatt Bertz
All songs	2024	Baby Bugs	In My Bones	Producer, Engineer	Baby Bugs, Esha Tewari, Solya	Baby Bugs, Sarah Tudzin
All songs	2024	Pom Pom Squad	Mirror Starts Moving Without Me	Producer, Engineer	Cody Fitzgerald, Jessica Boudreaux, Mia Berrin, Sabrina Song	Cody Fitzgerald, Jessica Boudreaux, Mia Berrin, Sarah Tudzin
All songs	2024	The Armed	Everlasting Gaze	Additional vocals	Dan Greene, Kenneth Szymanski, Randall Kupfer & Tony Wolski	Ben Chisholm, Justin Meldal-Johnsen, Tony Wolski, Troy Van Leeuwen
All songs	2024	Illuminati Hotties	POWER	Writer, Producer, Performer, Engineer	Cavetown, Sarah Tudzin, Jon Joseph, Maddie Ross, Nice Neighbors, Ryan Hemsworth, Suzy Shinn	Andy Rosen, John Congleton, Jon Joseph, Ryan Hemsworth
All songs	2024	Eliza McLamb	Going Through It	Producer, Engineer, Mixer	Eliza McLamb	—N/a
All songs	2024	Cloud Nothings	Final Summer	Mixer	Dylan Baldi, Jayson Gerycz	Jeff Zeigler
All songs	2025	McKinley Dixon	Magic, Alive	Guitar	Alfred, Anjimile, Blu, Ghais Guevara, ICECOLDBISHOP, McKinley Dixon, Quelle Chris, Sam Yamaha, Teller Bank$	Sam Koff, Sam Yamaha
All songs	2025	Julien Baker & Torres	Send a Prayer My Way	Engineer, Additional production	Julien Baker, Mackenzie Scott	Julien Baker, Mackenzie Scott
All songs	2025	Catbite	Doom Garden	Producer, Sound engineer, Mixer	Brittany Luna, Tim Hildebrand, Ben Parry, Chris Pires, and Kayleigh Malloy	—N/a
All songs	2025	Sunflower Bean	Mortal Primetime	Sound engineer	Julia Cumming, Nick Kivlen, Olive Faber, Oliver Hill & tiLLie	Jake Sinclair, Julia Cumming, Nick Kivlen & Olive Faber
All songs	2025	Eliza McLamb	Good Story	Producer, Sound engineer, Mixer, Additional vocals	Eliza McLamb	—N/a
All songs	2025	PUP	Who Will Look After The Dogs?	Additional vocals	Nestor Chumak, Stefan Babcock, Steve Sladkowski, Zack Mykula	John Congleton
All songs	2025	Illuminati Hotties	Nickel on the Fountain Floor	Writer, Vocals, Producer, Sound Engineer	Sarah Tudzin, Jay Som	Jay Som, John Congleton
All songs	2025	Lucy Dacus	Forever Is A Feeling: The Archives	Producer, Sound engineer	Jim Croce, Lucy Dacus	Andrew Lappin, Blake Mills, Jay Som, Lucy Dacus
All songs	2026	Julia Cumming	Julia	Sound engineer	Brian Robert Jones, Chris Coady, Daniel Ayala, Julia Cumming, Keeley Bumford	Brian Robert Jones, Chris Coady
Riochet and No Soldier	2026	Alex Cameron	Late to Set	Songwriter	Alex Cameron, Sarah Tudzin	Maxim Ludwig, Merk, Zachary Dawes
One Step	2026	Ryan Hemsworth	Numbskull	Songwriter, Additional vocals	Ryan Hemsworth, Sarah Tudzin	Ryan Hemsworth
All songs	2026	Spanish Love Songs	Future Nausea	Producer, Engineer, Mixer	Dylan Slocum, Kyle McAulay, Meredith Van Woert, Mike Trujillo, Ruben Duarte	Chris Walla

== Accolades ==
Year	Association	Nominated Work	Category	Result
2024	Grammy Awards	The Record	Album of the Year	Nominated
2024	Grammy Awards	The Record	Best Alternative Music Album	Won
2024	Grammy Awards	The Record	Best Engineered Album, Non-Classical	Nominated
2024	Grammy Awards	Not Strong Enough	Record of the Year	Nominated
2024	iHeartRadio Music Awards	The Record	Alternative Album of the Year	Won
