= No Life for Me =

Studio album by Wavves and Cloud Nothings
- Released: June 28, 2015
- Recorded: March 16–26, 2014; June 1–10, 2015
- Studios: Nathan Williams' house, Eagle Rock, California
- Genres: Post-punk; pop-punk; indie rock
- Length: 21:29
- Label: Ghost Ramp
- Producers: Nathan and Joel Williams

Wavves chronology
Afraid of Heights (2013)	No Life for Me (2015)	V (2015)

Cloud Nothings chronology
Here and Nowhere Else (2014)	No Life for Me (2015)	Life Without Sound (2017)

Professional ratings
Aggregate scores
Source	Rating
Metacritic	76/100
Review scores
Source	Rating
The A.V. Club	B+
Consequence of Sound	B
Exclaim!	8/10
Pitchfork	6/10

No Life for Me is a collaborative studio album by Wavves and Cloud Nothings, released in 2015.

== Track listing ==
All tracks are written by Nathan Williams and Dylan Baldi, except where noted.

No.	Title	Length
1.	"Untitled I"	1:21
2.	"How It's Gonna Go"	3:28
3.	"Come Down"	2:59
4.	"Hard to Find"	2:48
5.	"Untitled II"	1:15
6.	"Nervous"	2:12
7.	"No Life for Me"	3:20
8.	"Such a Drag" (Williams)	2:14
9.	"Nothing Hurts" (Baldi)	1:48
Total length:		21:29
