= The Shadow I Remember =

Studio album by Cloud Nothings
- Released: February 26, 2021
- Studios: Electrical Audio, Chicago
- Length: 32:08
- Labels: Carpark, Wichita
- Producer: Steve Albini

Cloud Nothings chronology
The Black Hole Understands (2020)	The Shadow I Remember (2021)	Final Summer (2024)

Singles from The Shadow I Remember
- 1. "Am I Something" Released: October 13, 2020; 2. "The Spirit Of" Released: November 17, 2020; 3. "Nothing Without You" Released: February 2, 2021

The Shadow I Remember is the seventh studio album by American rock band Cloud Nothings. It was released on February 26, 2021 via Carpark Records.

== Background ==
The album was recorded at Electrical Audio in Chicago, Illinois, with record producer Steve Albini.

== Release ==
On October 13, 2020, Cloud Nothings announced the release of the new album, which they had written while in quarantine during the COVID-19 pandemic.

== Singles ==
The first single to be released from the album, "Am I Something," was announced on the same day as the album details.

On November 17, 2020, "The Spirit Of" was announced as the second single.

The band released the third single, "Nothing Without You," on February 3, 2021. In a press release, lead vocalist Dylan Baldi said the song "explores both the negative and positive aspects of dependency, whether it be on a person, a place, an object, or nothing at all."

== Critical reception ==
Professional ratings
Aggregate scores
Source	Rating
AnyDecentMusic?	7.3/10
Metacritic	77/100
Review scores
Source	Rating
AllMusic	4.5/5 stars
Beats Per Minute	62%
Consequence of Sound	B+
DIY	4/5 stars
Exclaim!	8/10
The Line of Best Fit	6/10
NME	3/5 stars
Paste	7.3/10
Pitchfork	7.2/10

The Shadow I Remember was met with "generally favorable" reviews from critics. At Metacritic, which assigns a weighted average rating out of 100 to reviews from mainstream publications, this release received an average score of 77 based on 13 reviews. At AnyDecentMusic?, the website gave the album a 7.3 out of 10 based on 10 reviews.

Writing for AllMusic, Heather Phares gave the release a 4.5 out of 5, explaining "The Shadow I Remember's compact, hooky outbursts are just as potent as the slow-burning epics on Cloud Nothings' other albums. They're so seasoned that they can shift from bouncy to crushing and back again in a blink on "The Spirit Of," or whip through a dramatic buildup, blistering choruses, and a radiant coda in 90 seconds on "It's Love." In a review for The Line of Best Fit, Ben Lynch gave a mixed review for the album, noting the music is "typically replete with hooks and furious one-liners", and the band should "reassess once more before they head into the studio again."

== Track listing ==
No.	Title	Length
1.	"Oslo"	4:08
2.	"Nothing Without You"	3:18
3.	"The Spirit Of"	2:30
4.	"Only Light"	2:37
5.	"Nara"	2:28
6.	"Open Rain"	3:01
7.	"Sound of Alarm"	3:03
8.	"Am I Something"	3:26
9.	"It's Love"	1:31
10.	"A Longer Moon"	2:51
11.	"The Room It Was"	3:15
Total length:		32:08

== Personnel ==
Adapted from Allmusic.

Cloud Nothings

- Dylan Baldi – lead vocals, backing vocals, rhythm guitar
- Chris Brown – lead guitar, keyboards, backing vocals
- TJ Duke – bass, backing vocals
- Jayson Gerycz – drums

Additional personnel

- Steve Albini – engineering, production
- Rob Carmichael – design, layout
- Brett Naucke – synthesizer
- Greg Obis – mixing, mastering
- Macie Stewart – vocals
