= Life Without Sound =

Studio album by Cloud Nothings
- Released: January 27, 2017
- Recorded: 2016
- Studio: Sonic Ranch
- Genres: Indie rock, post-hardcore, noise rock, punk rock
- Length: 37:42
- Labels: Carpark, Wichita
- Producer: John Goodmanson

Cloud Nothings chronology
No Life for Me (2015)	Life Without Sound (2017)	Last Building Burning (2018)

Singles from Life Without Sound
- 1. "Modern Act" Released: 2016; 2. "Internal World" Released: 2017; 3. "Up to the Surface" Released: 2017

Life Without Sound is the fourth studio album by the American indie rock band Cloud Nothings, released on January 27, 2017 on Carpark Records. The album was produced and mixed by John Goodmanson, and is the first to feature guitarist Chris Brown.

== Reception ==
Professional ratings
Aggregate scores
Source	Rating
AnyDecentMusic?	7.1/10
Metacritic	79/100
Review scores
Source	Rating
AllMusic	3.5/5 stars
The A.V. Club	B+
Consequence of Sound	A−
DIY	4/5 stars
The Guardian	4/5 stars
Mojo	3/5 stars
Pitchfork	7.0/10
Record Collector	3/5 stars
Uncut	8/10
Vice	A−

According to Metacritic, Life Without Sound has received an aggregated score of 79 out of 100 based on 23 reviews, indicating "generally favorable reviews".

=== Accolades ===
Publication	Accolade	Year	Rank	Ref.
Drowned in Sound	Favourite Albums of 2017	2017	93	

== Track listing ==
All tracks are written by Cloud Nothings.

No.	Title	Length
1.	"Up to the Surface"	3:59
2.	"Things Are Right with You"	4:25
3.	"Internal World"	3:46
4.	"Darkened Rings"	3:32
5.	"Enter Entirely"	4:59
6.	"Modern Act"	4:10
7.	"Sight Unseen"	3:58
8.	"Strange Year"	3:27
9.	"Realize My Fate"	5:26
Total length:		37:42

== Charts ==
Chart (2017)	Peak position
Belgian Albums (Ultratop Wallonia)	103
Billboard Independent Albums	15
Billboard Top Tastemaker Albums	9
Billboard Vinyl Albums	5
Billboard Top Album Sales	60
