= Last Building Burning =

Studio album by Cloud Nothings
- Released: October 19, 2018
- Studios: Sonic Ranch, Tornillo, Texas
- Genre: Indie rock, emo, noise rock, post-hardcore
- Length: 35:38
- Labels: Carpark, Wichita
- Producer: Randall Dunn

Cloud Nothings chronology
Life Without Sound (2017)	Last Building Burning (2018)	The Black Hole Understands (2020)

Singles from Last Building Burning
- 1. "The Echo of the World" Released: August 13, 2018; 2. "Leave Him Now" Released: September 18, 2018; 3. "So Right So Clean" Released: October 9, 2018

Last Building Burning is the fifth studio album by American rock band Cloud Nothings. It was released on October 19, 2018, via Carpark Records.

== Production and release ==
The album was recorded in eight days with producer Randall Dunn, who is best known for his work in producing drone music and heavy metal music. Tracking took place at Sonic Ranch, a studio in the border town of Tornillo, Texas. The album was announced on August 13, 2018, which coincided with the release of the album's first single, "The Echo of the World." Prior to the album's release, two further singles were released: "Leave Him Now" and "So Right So Clean."

== Reception ==
Professional ratings
Aggregate scores
Source	Rating
Metacritic	79/100
Review scores
Source	Rating
AllMusic	4/5 stars
Consequence of Sound	B
DIY	4/5 stars
Drowned in Sound	8/10
Exclaim!	8/10
The Line of Best Fit	9/10
Pitchfork	7.6/10

According to Metacritic, Last Building Burning has received an aggregated score of 79/100 based on 13 reviews, indicating "generally favorable reviews".

== Track listing ==
All music and lyrics by Dylan Baldi.

No.	Title	Length
1.	"On an Edge"	3:15
2.	"Leave Him Now"	3:04
3.	"In Shame"	3:34
4.	"Offer an End"	4:08
5.	"The Echo of the World"	3:56
6.	"Dissolution"	10:51
7.	"So Right So Clean"	3:42
8.	"Another Way of Life"	3:08
Total length:		35:38

== Personnel ==
Cloud Nothings

- Dylan Baldi - lead vocals, guitar, backing vocals
- Chris Brown - guitar, backing vocals
- T.J. Duke - bass, backing vocals
- Jayson Gerycz - drums

Additional personnel

- Randall Dunn - production, mixing
- Jason Ward - mastering
- Rob Carmichael - design

== Charts ==
Chart (2018)	Peak position
UK Independent Album Breakers (OCC)	14
US Top Current Albums (Billboard)	98
US Independent Albums (Billboard)	23
US Top Alternative Album Sales (Billboard)	14
US Top Rock Album Sales (Billboard)	34
