= Death of a Cheerleader (album) =

Studio album by Pom Pom Squad
- Released: June 25, 2021
- Genre: Indie rock
- Label: City Slang
- Producer: Sarah Tudzin

Pom Pom Squad chronology
Ow (2019)	Death of a Cheerleader (2021)

Singles from Death of a Cheerleader
- 1. "Red with Love" Released: February 14, 2020; 2. "Crimson + Clover" Released: June 19, 2020; 3. "Lux" Released: March 2, 2021; 4. "Head Cheerleader" Released: April 20, 2021; 5. "Crying" Released: June 8, 2021

Death of a Cheerleader is an album by Pom Pom Squad.

== Background ==
Musically, Berrin pulled inspiration from riot grrrl bands, 60's girl groups, Billie Holiday, and Motown. The title of "Second That" is a nod to the Smokey Robinson hit, "I Second That Emotion."

Berrin cited feelings of isolation as a person of color in the music industry as an inspiration for Death of a Cheerleader, stating that "I wanted to define myself in different terms than other people defined me." Berrin also took inspiration from the realization that she is queer, describing many of the songs as having been inspired by someone who taught her "a lot about my queerness and the space that it occupies inside of me." As she describes in an interview for The Village Voice:

...I have always played with this cheerleader archetype since I started [Pom Pom Squad]. I was growing up in these predominantly white neighborhoods. The young women with the most value were beautiful athletic popular cheerleaders. I was aspiring to, 1) an impossible standard, 2) a white standard, and 3) something that I didn’t even want, which was the validation and attention of the dudes around me. When I fell in love and realized that I didn’t want that at all, it just changed everything about me.

== Critical reception ==
Professional ratings
Aggregate scores
Source	Rating
AnyDecentMusic?	7.9/10
Metacritic	87/100
Review scores
Source	Rating
Clash	9/10
The Line of Best Fit	9/10
Paste	8.7/10
Pitchfork	6.9/10
The Upcoming	2/5 stars

Upon its release, Death of a Cheerleader received generally positive reviews from music critics. At Metacritic, which assigns a normalized rating out of 100 to reviews from critics, the album received an average score of 87, which indicates "universal acclaim", based on 7 reviews.

Rachel Saywitz in The Line of Best Fit claims the Pom Pom Squad "subvert expectations, all the while converting the pain points of adolescence and the boredom of high school suburbia into whimsical fantasy."

In a review published in Consequence, Paolo Ragusa writes that "Mia Berrin solidifies her place among the newest class of indie stalwart songwriters, carving out this space in a fearless and vulnerable way."

"Equally indebted to pioneering girl groups as well as her punk heroes, the album is a fiery and compelling—albeit slightly uneven—exploration of love, anger, and coming-of-age," writes Abby Jones for Pitchfork.

=== Accolades ===
Death of a Cheerleader on year-end lists
Publication	List	Rank	Ref.
Paste	The 50 Best Albums of 2021	44	

== Track listing ==
All tracks are written by Mia Berrin, except where noted.

No.	Title	Writer(s)	Length
1.	"Soundcheck"		0:51
2.	"Head Cheerleader"		3:08
3.	"Crying"		3:09
4.	"Second That"		2:32
5.	"Cake"	Henson Popa, Berrin	1:48
6.	"Lux"		1:39
7.	"Crimson + Clover"	Tommy James, Peter Lucia	2:03
8.	"Red with Love"		2:28
9.	"Forever"	Berrin, Garret Chabot	3:10
10.	"Shame Reactions"	Shelby Keller, Berrin	1:32
11.	"Drunk Voicemail"		3:29
12.	"This Couldn't Happen"	Lionel Newman, Dorcas Cochran	1:26
13.	"Be Good"		2:36
14.	"Thank You and Goodnight"		0:23
Total length:			30:21

== Personnel ==
Pom Pom Squad

- Mia Berrin – vocals
- Mari Alé Figeman – bass
- Shelby Keller – drums and percussion
- Alex Mercuri – lead guitar

Additional musicians

- Em Sgouros – vibraphone (1, 12, 13)
- Tegan Quin – guest vocals (2)
- Spencer Peppet – additional vocals (3, 7, 9, 12)
- Henson Popa – additional vocals (5, 7)
- Lydia Paulos – cello (3, 5, 7, 9, 12, 13)
- Camellia Hartman – violin (3, 5, 7, 9, 12, 13)
- Lizzie No – Harp (3, 8, 9, 12, 13)
- Sarah Tudzin – additional programming, additional guitar (7) additional keys (3, 4)
- Noah Weinman – horns (13)
