= Catbite =

American ska band

- Origin: Philadelphia, Pennsylvania, U.S.
- Genres: Ska; ska punk
- Years active: 2018–present
- Labels: Bad Time Records
- Members: Brittany Luna; Tim Hildebrand; Chris Pires; Ben Parry; Kayleigh Malloy
- Website: https://catbite.net

Catbite is an American ska band formed in 2018. They are signed to Bad Time Records.

The band has collaborated with other ska artists including Jer Hunter, Mike Park, Laura Jane Grace, as well as Fall Out Boy singer Patrick Stump.

== History ==
Prior to forming Catbite, Brittany Luna trained as a jazz singer but migrated to punk and ska. Tim Hildebrand worked for The Interrupters as a driver and performed non-show duties and was also part of The Snails. Britt and Tim formed Catbite, and recruited their friend Chris Pires to play drums. Ben Perry joined Catbite about a year after the band started. Ben was formerly with The Snails and was initially just subbing in for the original bass player who had left the band before he became a full band member.

Catbite was formed prior to the COVID-19 pandemic. Members said they "didn't think they would make it past those first three years."

The first album, the self-titled Catbite cost around $400 to make over the course of four days.

Interest in the band started to grow around 2018 with a resurgence in ska. The band started to achieve national presence due to promoters like Jeremy Hunter of Skatune Network and Mike Sosinski of Bad Time Records. Bad Time Records started specifically to promote ska artists. Catbite was one of the label's earliest signings and the first new release following represses of older Kill Lincoln and We Are The Union albums.

The album Nice One took 4 months to write. Catbite performed selections from the album live in July 2021 at a WXPN Free At Noon concert. This performance was then picked up by NPR's World Cafe podcast for a mini-concert series.

The band released a six song EP titled Doom Garden on May 9, 2025, which was produced by Sarah Tudzin and featured Patrick Stump and Sweet Pill.

== Operation Ivy Covers ==
Catbite joined up with Laura Jane Grace at the 2024 Supernova Ska Festival to perform covers of Operation Ivy. Catbite again performed with Grace at Riot Fest 2024.

While in Chicago the group performed a secret set at a Riot Fest Afterparty at The Empty Bottle. The live recording of this performance was later posted to Bandcamp as a pay what you want fundraiser for the victims of the 2025 California Wildfires

Of the team up Grace stated "I hope it’s all leading towards Operation Ivy getting back together and playing"

== Discography ==
- Catbite (2019)
- Amphetamine Delight 7" (2019)
- Catbite Live From an Empty War3house (2020)
- Catfite: A HXC Version of Catbite S/T (2021)
- Catlite: A Yee-Haw Version of Catbite S/T (2021)
- Nice One (2021)
- Wavebreaker #2 (2022) (split EP with Mike Park)
- Doom Garden (2025)
