= Attack on Memory =

Studio album by Cloud Nothings
- Released: January 24, 2012
- Recorded: 2011 at Electrical Audio
- Genres: Indie rock; post-hardcore; noise rock; emo
- Length: 33:50
- Labels: Carpark, Wichita
- Producer: Steve Albini

Cloud Nothings chronology
Cloud Nothings (2011)	Attack on Memory (2012)	Here and Nowhere Else (2014)

Singles from Attack on Memory
- 1. "No Future/No Past" Released: 2012; 2. "Stay Useless" Released: 2012; 3. "Fall In" Released: 2012

Attack on Memory is the second studio album by American indie rock band Cloud Nothings, released on January 24, 2012, by Carpark Records. Produced by Steve Albini at his Electrical Audio studio in Chicago, the recording sessions saw frontman Dylan Baldi's live band contributing as full-time members and co-writers. Attack on Memory features a heavier sound and darker songs, a sharp turn from the power pop of previous Cloud Nothings releases.

== Recording ==
=== Production ===
Attack on Memory was engineered by Steve Albini at his Electrical Audio studio in Chicago. Dylan Baldi saw Albini as someone who made bands "sound like they're playing a live show," and that he wanted the album "to sound like us playing." Albini had a hands-off approach to recording the album during the four days Cloud Nothings recorded with him. Dylan Baldi claimed that Albini spent much of the recording time playing Scrabble and blogging, and that Albini never made any suggestions to the band. Albini elaborated on Baldi's claim in an Ask Me Anything, saying that he would read "dry, un-interesting stuff" to prevent him from interfering with the recording process when unnecessary, while at the same time being able to stop what he's doing when he hears something obtrusive.

=== Musical style ===
Attack on Memory saw a change in Cloud Nothings' musical style. While previous Cloud Nothings albums were pop albums, the tone of Attack on Memory is more aggressive. Dylan Baldi called the album a bunch of "depressing songs," and cited his boredom with power pop as attributable to the album's musical style. Additionally, the title was a reflection of Baldi's feelings towards Cloud Nothings' previous sound: "an attack on the memory of what people thought the band was."

For specific influences, Baldi cited Black Sabbath, Nina Hagen, Killdozer, Zounds, Thin Lizzy, The Wipers, Bitch Magnet and Swell Maps.

== Release ==
Attack on Memory was first announced on October 28, 2011. The first single from the album was "No Future/No Past," released on November 7, 2011. "No Future/No Past" received a Best New Track designation from Pitchfork. The second single from the album was "Stay Useless," released December 9, 2011. Like "No Future/No Past," "Stay Useless" received a Best New Track designation from Pitchfork. A third track from Attack on Memory, "No Sentiment," was released on January 13, 2012. On January 17, 2012, the album was streamed in its entirety.

== Reception ==
Professional ratings
Aggregate scores
Source	Rating
AnyDecentMusic?	7.6/10
Metacritic	83/100
Review scores
Source	Rating
AllMusic	4/5 stars
The A.V. Club	A−
The Guardian	4/5 stars
Mojo	4/5 stars
MSN Music (Expert Witness)	A−
NME	8/10
Pitchfork	8.6/10
Q	4/5 stars
Rolling Stone	3.5/5 stars
Spin	9/10

Attack on Memory has received strong reviews. The album has a score of 83 out of 100 on the review aggregate site Metacritic, based on 33 reviews.

Pitchfork's Ian Cohen gave the album a Best New Album designation, writing "But like the best of indie's recent guitar bands that dare to skew retro [...] Attack on Memory is too visceral to feel like escapism, too vital to feel like cheap revival." Steven Hyden of The A.V. Club also praised the album, writing "Baldi used to write like a kid anxiously dodging boredom; on Attack On Memory, he’s moved in the opposite direction, opening up wide spaces in his music and letting the fury beneath breathe and then bellow." Consequence of Sound's Michael Roffman praised the album "[d]espite the vaguely emo lyricism," writing "Baldi hardly comes off as juvenile. He’s far too sincere and angst-driven, only it’s the "from-the-bowels" sort of angst that Hutch Harris trademarked with his Thermals outfit. Zachary Houle of PopMatters called the album "an album that was well worth the wait," writing "Hyper and frenzied, Attack on Memory has every right to be an anticipated early album of 2012. It’s great, catchy as hell, and bristling with retro rage and vitriol."

Tiny Mix Tapes' Conrad Tao, on the other hand, criticized the lyrics, writing "'No Future/No Past' and 'No Sentiment' work as anthems of angst but are lyrically confused, the former’s aggression at odds with its insistence on apathy while the latter has the worst line of the whole album: 'No nostalgia, no sentiment, we’re over it now.'" Adam Downer of Sputnikmusic also had a mixed reaction to the album, writing on the band's new sound: "They might misguidedly masquerade as something more 'authentic' by hiding behind a bunch of muddy bullshit, but the muddy bullshit is conspicuously calculated, which invalidates its purpose. In other words, they try not to be what they were previously by aping a different, heavier sound, and the resulting record's a hodgepodge."

=== Accolades ===
Pitchfork ranked Attack on Memory No. 19 on its list of the top 50 albums of 2012, writing: "For too long, indie bands didn’t want to get their hands dirty; with Attack on Memory, Cloud Nothings were out for blood." The album was listed at No. 21 on Rolling Stone's list of the top 50 albums of 2012, saying "Drums pummel, guitars chew scenery, and Baldi's scream makes old-school aggro-depression feel like new-school joy." The album was listed 6th on Stereogum's list of top 50 albums of 2012.

== Track listing ==
All songs by Cloud Nothings.

No.	Title	Length
1.	"No Future/No Past"	4:41
2.	"Wasted Days"	8:54
3.	"Fall In"	3:15
4.	"Stay Useless"	2:46
5.	"Separation"	3:04
6.	"No Sentiment"	3:35
7.	"Our Plans"	4:16
8.	"Cut You"	3:16
Total length:		33:47

== Charts ==
Chart (2012)	Peak position
US Billboard 200	121
US Top Heatseekers	3
US Rock Albums	37
US Independent Albums	21
US Alternative Albums	25
