= Sir Chloe =

American indie rock band

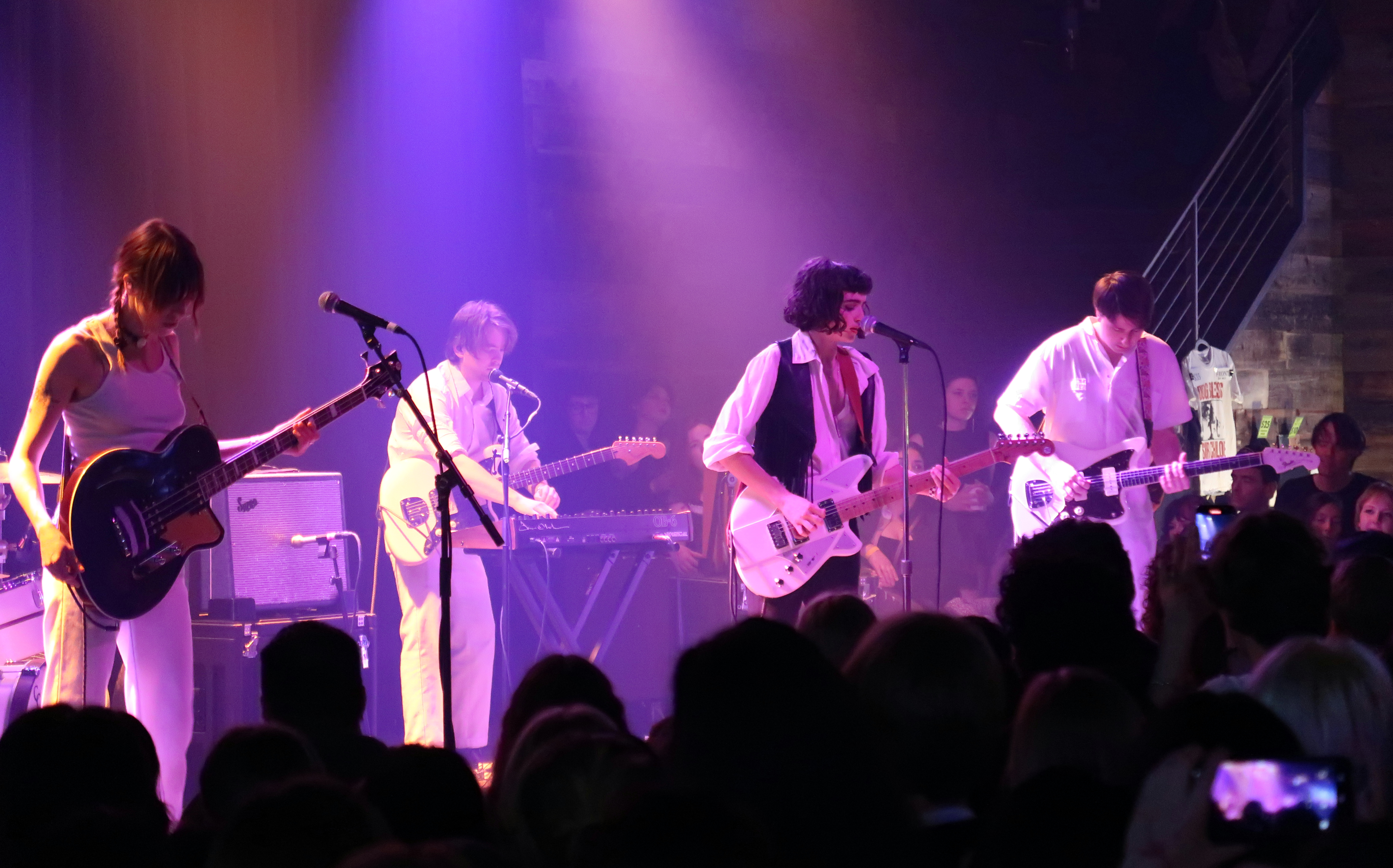
- Sir Chloe performing at Goldfield Trading Post in Roseville, California

Background information
- Origin: Bennington, Vermont
- Genres: Indie rock; Alternative rock
- Years active: 2017–present
- Labels: Terrible; Atlantic; ONErpm
- Website: www.sirchloemusic.com

Dana Foote, better known by her stage name Sir Chloe, is an American indie rock artist from New York.

== History ==
Sir Chloe began in 2017, when lead singer Dana Foote was a senior at Bennington College, studying music composition. Instead of writing a thesis, she opted to create a concert consisting only of original music, forming a band with her classmates. Sir Chloe gained widespread popularity when their song "Michelle" went viral on the video sharing application TikTok. The band released their debut EP, Party Favors, in 2020.

Sir Chloe released a cover of The Velvet Underground's "Femme Fatale" and a new version of "Michelle" in 2021.

In 2022, Sir Chloe released non-album singles "Company" and "Mercy". In 2023, they announced their debut studio album I Am the Dog and shared lead single "Hooves" on February 23, featuring writing and production contributions by John Congleton and Sarah Tudzin of Illuminati Hotties. I Am the Dog was released on May 19, 2023. They toured with Beck and Phoenix during the following summer. In 2024, they released three standalone singles: "Seventeen", "Home Where", and "Over Again", the latter featuring writing contributions from singer Claud. They also embarked on The Savory Tour in 2024 as well. They were also an opening act for American singer Halsey on her fifth headlining concert tour in 2025.

Sir Chloe released the lead single "Forgiving" which would later be on their third studio album, on May 23, 2025. With the release of the second single on June 24, 2025, they announced that the album, called "Swallow the Knife", would be released on August 22, 2025.

== Influences ==
Foote cites Balkan music as well as Cage the Elephant as inspirations for composing music.

== Backing band ==
Current members

- Dana Foote – lead vocals, guitars
- Soph Shreds - guitars
- Maya Stepansky - drums
- Alina Sloan - bass

Past members

- Teddy O'Mara – guitars
- Palmer Foote – drums, percussion
- Austin Holmes – synthesizers
- Willy Giambalvo
- Pixel West
- Emma Welch
- Emma Stacher
- Zach Dawes

== Gallery ==
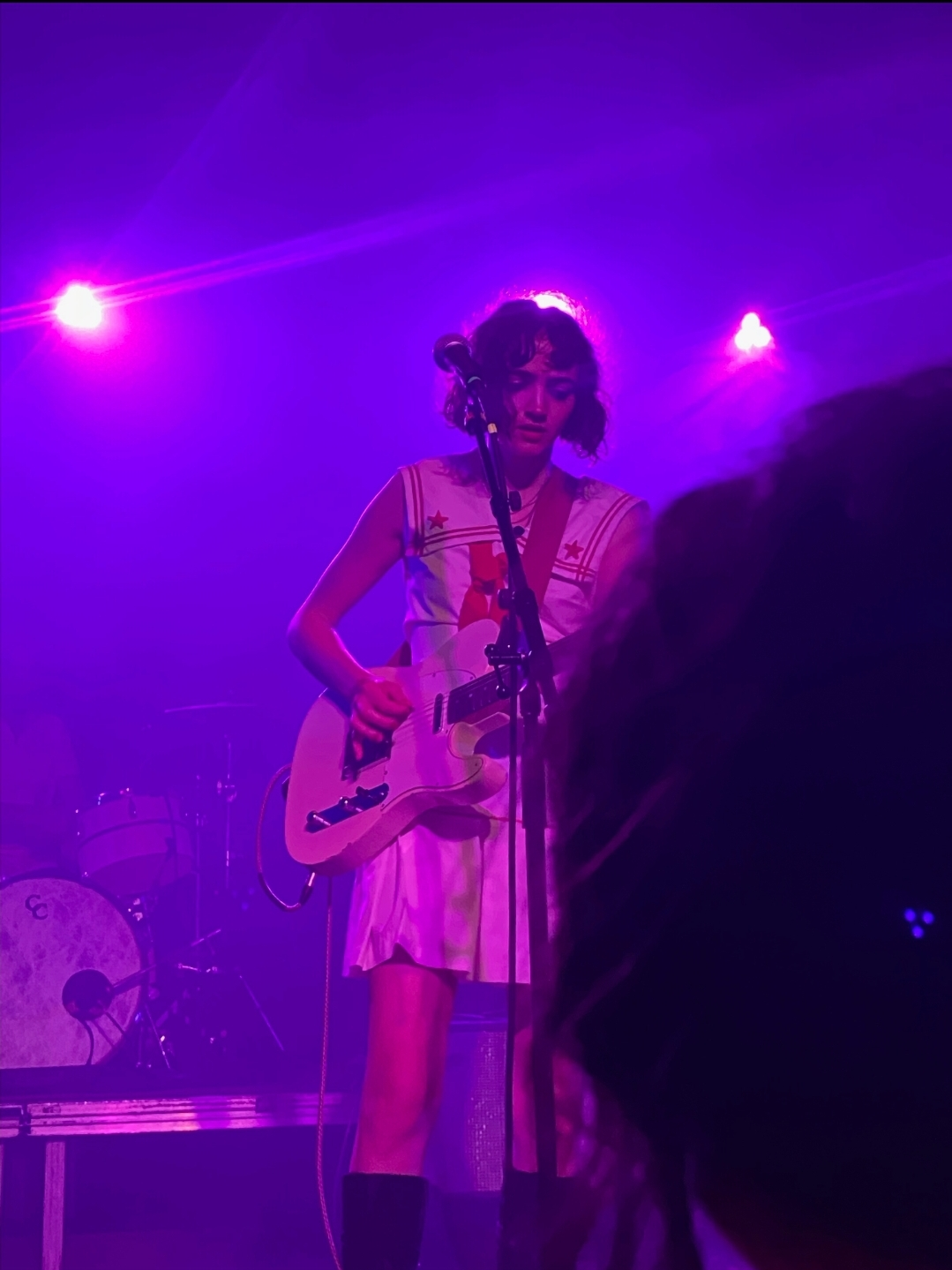
Dana Foote at the Hawthorne Theater in Portland, Oregon

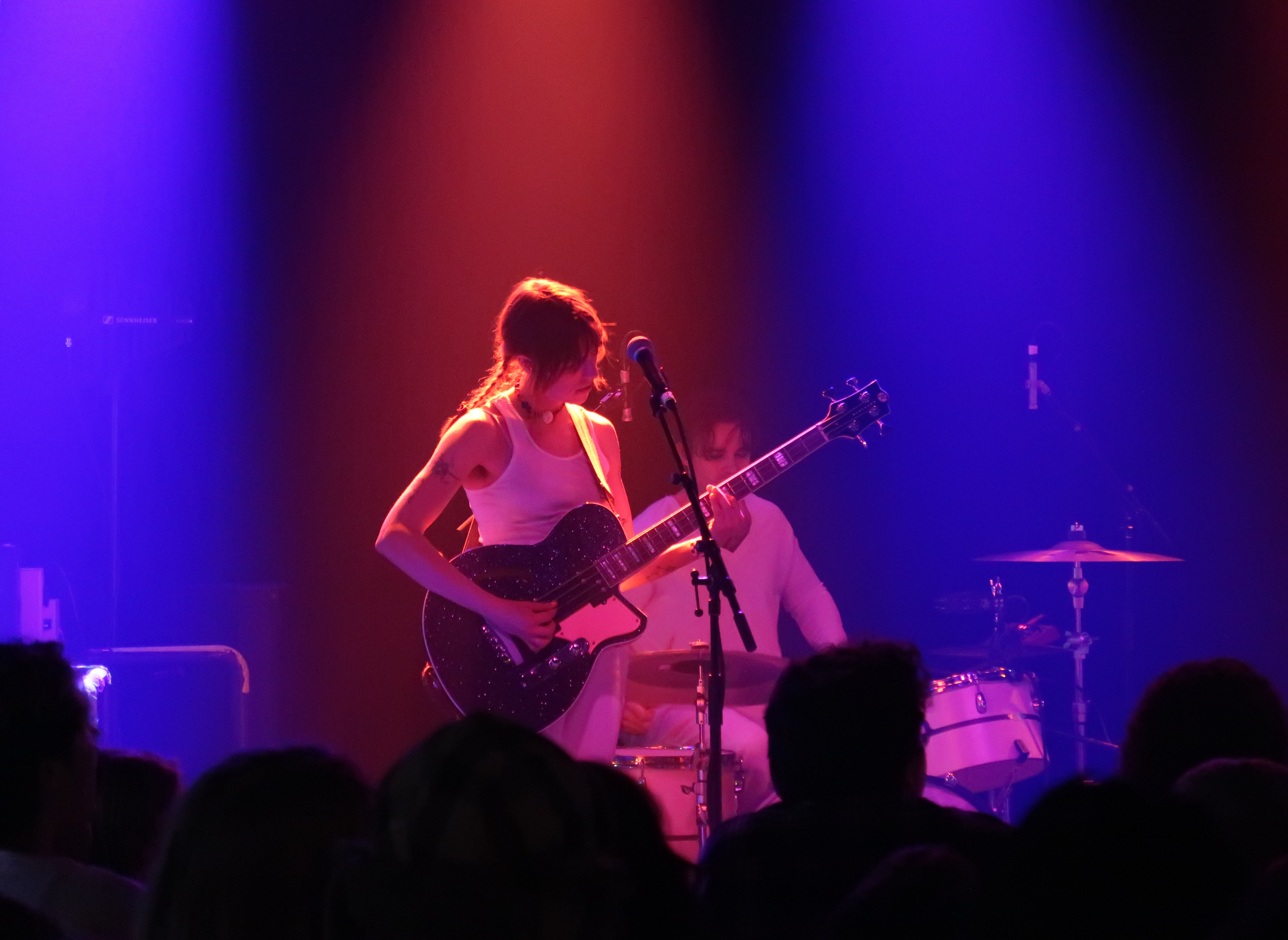
Emma Welch and Palmer Foote at Goldfield - Roseville

== Discography ==
=== Studio albums ===
- I Am the Dog (2023)
- Swallow the Knife (2025)

=== EPs ===
- Party Favors (2020; Terrible Records)

=== Singles ===
- "Eyes" (15 August, 2025; ONErpm)
- "Passenger" (31 July 2025; ONErpm)
- "The Hole" (24 June 2025)
- "Forgiving" (23 May 2025; Atlantic Records)
- "Over Again" (7 March 2024; Atlantic Records)
- "Seventeen" (17 January 2024; Atlantic Records)
- "Home Where" (3 November 2023; Atlantic Records)
- "Know Better" (20 April 2023; Atlantic Records)
- "Salivate" (23 March 2023; Atlantic Records)
- "Hooves" (23 February 2023; Atlantic Records)
- "Company" (6 May 2022)
- "Mercy" (1 March 2022)
- "Femme Fatale" (The Velvet Underground cover) (8 September 2021)
- "La Femme Michelle" (13 July 2021; Terrible Records)
- "Sedona" (16 September 2020)
- "July" (29 July 2020; Terrible Records)
- "Easy on You" (2020)
- "Untie You" (2020)
- "Too Close" (19 July 2019; Terrible Records)
- "Walk You Home" (21 May 2019; Terrible Records)
- "Michelle" (11 April 2019; Terrible Records)
- "Animal" (28 February 2019; Terrible Records)
