= Here and Nowhere Else =

Studio album by Cloud Nothings
- Released: April 1, 2014
- Recorded: 2013
- Studio: Water Music
- Genres: Indie rock; garage rock; post-hardcore; noise rock; pop punk
- Length: 31:30
- Labels: Carpark, Wichita
- Producer: John Congleton

Cloud Nothings chronology
Attack on Memory (2012)	Here and Nowhere Else (2014)	No Life for Me (2015)

Alternative cover
- 10th anniversary deluxe edition

Singles from Here and Nowhere Else
- 1. "I'm Not Part of Me" Released: January 24, 2014; 2. "Psychic Trauma" Released: February 25, 2014; 3. "Now Hear In" Released: September 30, 2014

Here and Nowhere Else is the third studio album and fourth LP overall by Cloud Nothings. It was released on April 1, 2014, on Carpark Records, and was produced and mixed by John Congleton.

== Background ==
The album was initially teased on December 4, 2013, and announced on January 27, 2014. According to lead singer Dylan Baldi, the album was mostly written while on the road and, rather than continuing the more pessimistic songwriting of Attack on Memory, instead was about stuff that made Baldi happy. Elaborating on this statement, "I had nothing to be angry about really so the approach was more positive and less ‘fuck everything.’ I just sat down and played until I found something that I like, because I was finally in a position to do that.” According to Baldi, it is likely that every song was written in a different country.

The tracks "I'm Not Part of Me", "Now Hear In", and "Psychic Trauma" would be released as singles and have music videos shot in promotion of the record, with the two latter tracks both charting in the Mexico Ingles Airplay.

== Reception ==
Professional ratings
Aggregate scores
Source	Rating
AnyDecentMusic?	7.8/10
Metacritic	79/100
Review scores
Source	Rating
AllMusic	4/5 stars
The A.V. Club	B
Consequence of Sound	A
The Guardian	4/5 stars
Mojo	3/5 stars
NME	5/10
Pitchfork	8.7/10
Rolling Stone	3.5/5 stars
Slant Magazine	4/5 stars
Spin	8/10

Music aggregation site Metacritic gave the album a 79/100 from 29 reviews, indicating "generally favorable reviews".

Philip Cosores of Consequence of Sound wrote that while the bands songs may sound like "instigators, getting people riled up for some masculine bro-down and canned beer chugging", but are rather "desperate and haunted, dealing with mental illness, instability, heartbreak, and the human condition in a very honest and direct manner, without being bogged down in self-pity". Moreover, he describes this factor of the bands music as a good thing, specific highlights included "Now Hear In", which they described as an existential number that "calls everything into question", with a tempo that "wants to rush away too fast" but is slowed down by the percussion. Other highlights include "Psychic Trauma" and "No Thoughts", which they believed sounds influenced by Kurt Cobain, and Billie Joe Armstrong on "I'm Not Part of Me". They also praised the longest track, "Pattern Walks" as surprisingly not "contrived or predictable", stating that by the end, "beauty" seeps its way into the track.

Al Horner of NME believed that when compared to the bands previous album Attack on Memory, the record felt "tame and unimposing in comparison". Moreover, stating that it wasn't the production or talent of the members, but rather the songwriting holding back the album, stating that the tracks lacked a unique identity unique from similar bands such as Wavves. They still had specific highlights they enjoyed, such as "Quieter Today", "Psychic Trauma", and "Pattern Walks". Overall, they thought that "Cloud Nothings’ prolific work rate has caught up with them. For the first time, they sound tired and lacking in imagination."

Pitchfork's Ian Cohen praised the record, saying that Baldi "is simply unwilling or unable to stop writing hook-filled songs, rendering Here and Nowhere Else even more tense and thrillingly conflicted than its predecessor." In 2019, Pitchfork included "I'm Not Part of Me" on their list of "The 200 Best Songs of the 2010s".

== Release and legacy ==
"I'm Not Part of Me" is featured in the soundtracks of Tony Hawk's Pro Skater 5 and 2016 film Almost Friends.

On June 24, 2024, it was announced that in celebration of the tenth anniversary of the albums release, the album would be performed in full in venues across the United States, alongside a deluxe edition featuring a full live performance and two remixes of "Giving Into Seeing" and "I'm Not Part of Me".

== Track listing ==
All tracks are written by Cloud Nothings.

No.	Title	Length
1.	"Now Hear In"	3:30
2.	"Quieter Today"	3:04
3.	"Psychic Trauma"	2:52
4.	"Just See Fear"	3:08
5.	"Giving Into Seeing"	3:48
6.	"No Thoughts"	3:04
7.	"Pattern Walks"	7:23
8.	"I'm Not Part of Me"	4:35
Total length:		31:24

== Personnel ==
Cloud Nothings

- Dylan Baldi – lead vocals, rhythm guitar
- TJ Duke – bass, backing vocals
- Jayson Gerycz – drums

Technical

- John Congleton – production

== Charts ==
Chart performance for Here and Nowhere Else
Chart (2014)	Peak position
US Billboard 200 (Billboard)	50
US Alternative Albums (Billboard)	12
US Independent Albums (Billboard)	12
US Rock Albums (Billboard)	16
ARIA Charts (ARIA)	8
Ultratop Flanders (Ultratop)	80
UK Independent Singles and Albums Charts (OCC)	30
Official Record Store Chart (OCC)	26
