= The Black Hole Understands =

Studio album by Cloud Nothings
- Released: July 3, 2020
- Recorded: 2020 in Philadelphia and Cleveland
- Length: 30:09
- Label: Self-released
- Producer: Cloud Nothings

Cloud Nothings chronology
Last Building Burning (2018)	The Black Hole Understands (2020)	The Shadow I Remember (2021)

The Black Hole Understands is the sixth studio album by Cloud Nothings. It was self-released on July 3, 2020.

== Recording ==
The Black Hole Understands was recorded as live shows would not be happening for the foreseeable future due to the coronavirus pandemic. About a month into quarantine, Dylan Baldi and Jayson Gerycz starting sending files back and forth, with guitars, bass and vocals for the new songs recorded in Philadelphia, while drums and mixing took place in Cleveland. The album was mastered by Jack Callahan in New York City.

== Release ==
The Black Hole Understands was released July 3, 2020 on Bandcamp.

== Reception ==
Professional ratings
Review scores
Source	Rating
Exclaim!	7/10
NME	4/5 stars
Pitchfork	7.5/10

Pitchfork stated, "Despite being recorded in an era of unthinkable instability, it is the most assuredly melodic Cloud Nothings has sounded in years" and that the band "make the dulled ennui of everyday life sound like an escapist fantasy". NME wrote, "Though much of lockdown has felt like the walls are closing in, the joyous The Black Hole Understands sees Cloud Nothings help us feel like we can bust right through them into a brighter future."

== Track listing ==
All tracks are written by Cloud Nothings.

No.	Title	Length
1.	"Story That I Live"	3:09
2.	"The Sound of Everyone"	3:21
3.	"An Average World"	2:33
4.	"A Weird Interaction"	3:05
5.	"Tall Gray Structure"	2:16
6.	"A Silent Reaction"	3:54
7.	"The Mess Is Permanent"	3:40
8.	"Right on the Edge"	2:45
9.	"Memory of Regret"	2:46
10.	"The Black Hole Understands"	2:40
Total length:		30:09
