= Cloud Nothings (album) =

Studio album by Cloud Nothings
- Released: January 24, 2011
- Recorded: 2010 in Baltimore
- Genre: Indie rock; emo; power pop
- Length: 28:07
- Label: Carpark (US); Wichita (UK)
- Producer: Chester Gwazda

Cloud Nothings chronology
Turning On (2010)	Cloud Nothings (2011)	Attack on Memory (2012)

Cloud Nothings is the first full-length studio album and second LP overall by Cloud Nothings. It was released on January 24, 2011, by Carpark Records and was produced and mixed by Chester Gwazda at his home studio in Baltimore. All songs were written and performed by Dylan Baldi.

== Accolades ==
Pitchfork awarded the album a 7.9 and stated "The result is another fantastic step forward, though not without some growing pains." The A.V. Club felt that "The Cleveland teenager slashes though catchy melodies like broken guitar-strings on his full-length debut as Cloud Nothings, as if mad dashes of melodicism grew on trees." The New York Times said "His first full album, Cloud Nothings (Carpark)--11 songs in 28 minutes—raises the production values only slightly, cutting back distortion while layering on guitars. But it keeps the sound of a guy holed up with his instruments, concocting hooks and strumming retaliation for every slight."

== Track listing ==
All songs by Dylan Baldi.

Cloud Nothings track listing
No.	Title	Length
1.	"Understand at All"	2:35
2.	"Not Important"	2:31
3.	"Should Have"	3:09
4.	"Forget You All the Time"	2:57
5.	"Nothing's Wrong"	2:43
6.	"Heartbeat"	1:10
7.	"Rock"	1:42
8.	"You're Not That Good at Anything"	2:37
9.	"Been Through"	3:26
10.	"On the Radio"	2:07
11.	"All the Time"	3:10
Total length:		28:07
