= Guppy (band) =

American indie rock band

Guppy is an American indie rock band from Los Angeles, California. As of 2025, Guppy has released three full-length albums.

The members of Guppy met while students at Emerson College in Boston, Massachusetts. In 2019, the group released their first album titled In Heat. In 2022, they announced plans to release their second full-length album. The album, Big Man Says Slappydoo, was released on April 22 through Lauren Records. The album was produced by Sarah Tudzin of Illuminati Hotties. On May 17, 2024, Guppy released their third full-length album Something Is Happening... through Lauren Records, also produced by Sarah Tudzin.

== Releases ==
=== LPs ===
Guppy - IN THE GARAGE (2017, Self Released)

=== Albums ===
Guppy - In Heat (2019, Self Released)

Guppy - Big Man Says Slappydoo (2022, Lauren Records)

Guppy - Something is Happening... (2024, Lauren Records)

=== Singles ===
Guppy - Cactus Dreams (2018, Self Released)

Guppy, Cheekface - Geek Stink Breath/ Walking Contradiction (2020, Self Released)

Guppy - Burrito (2023, Lauren Records)

Guppy - I'm in the Band (2023, Lauren Records)

Guppy - A Jew on Christmas (2023, Lauren Records)
