= Final Summer =

Studio album by Cloud Nothings
- Released: April 19, 2024
- Length: 29:16
- Label: Pure Noise Records

Cloud Nothings chronology
The Shadow I Remember (2021)	Final Summer (2024)	What Kind of Hell Did You Survive? (2027)

Singles from Final Summer
- 1. "Final Summer" Released: November 1, 2023; 2. "Running Through the Campus" Released: February 28, 2024; 3. "I'd Get Along" Released: March 19, 2024

Final Summer is the eighth studio album by American rock band Cloud Nothings.

== Background ==
The album was recorded and tracked in Philadelphia by Jeff Ziegler, mixed by Sarah Tudzin and mastered by Jack Callahan.

== Release ==
Final Summer was released on April 19, 2024, on Pure Noise Records.

== Critical reception ==
Professional ratings
Aggregate scores
Source	Rating
Metacritic	78/100
Review scores
Source	Rating
AllMusic	4/5 stars
PopMatters	8/10
Exclaim!	7/10
Pitchfork	7.5/10

Final Summer was met with "generally favorable" reviews from critics. At Metacritic, which assigns a weighted average rating out of 100 to reviews from mainstream publications, this release received an average score of 78 based on 9 reviews.

Pitchfork awarded the album a 7.5 while noting "With spruced-up production highlighting new subtleties in their sound, yet never abandoning their melodic fundamentals, the Cleveland indie rockers' latest radiates a renewed sense of purpose." adding "Cloud Nothings have never sounded so committed to going the distance." Writing for Flood Magazine, Jeff Terich wrote "The sentiments are warmer, perhaps, but Cloud Nothings haven't softened. The band's energy level never slackens throughout Final Summer, and the entirety of the record's half-hour run time sounds massive, even at its most deceptively simple. But in moments like "I'd Get Along," a towering anthem in which Baldi wrings every last ounce of power from only two lines, Cloud Nothings reveal how much artistic growth they've undergone." Errick Easterday of PopMatters rates the album 8/10 and declares "Cloud Nothings' 'Final Summer' is a masterclass in indie rock. Cloud Nothings have delivered record after record of catchy, energetic songs without getting stale or repetitive. Final Summer continues that streak."

== Track listing ==
No.	Title	Length
1.	"Final Summer"	4:09
2.	"Daggers of Light"	2:44
3.	"I'd Get Along"	2:30
4.	"Mouse Policy"	3:06
5.	"Silence"	2:47
6.	"Running Through the Campus"	2:48
7.	"The Golden Halo"	2:12
8.	"Thank Me For Playing"	2:29
9.	"On the Chain"	3:25
10.	"Common Mistake"	3:06
Total length:		29:16

== Personnel ==
Adapted from Allmusic.

Cloud Nothings

- Dylan Baldi – vocals, guitar
- Chris Brown – bass
- Jayson Gerycz – drums

Additional personnel

- Jack Callahan - mastering
- Sarah Tudzin - mixing
- Jeff Zeigler - tracking
- Chris Madak - slide guitar (1)
