= Cloud Nothings =

American indie rock band

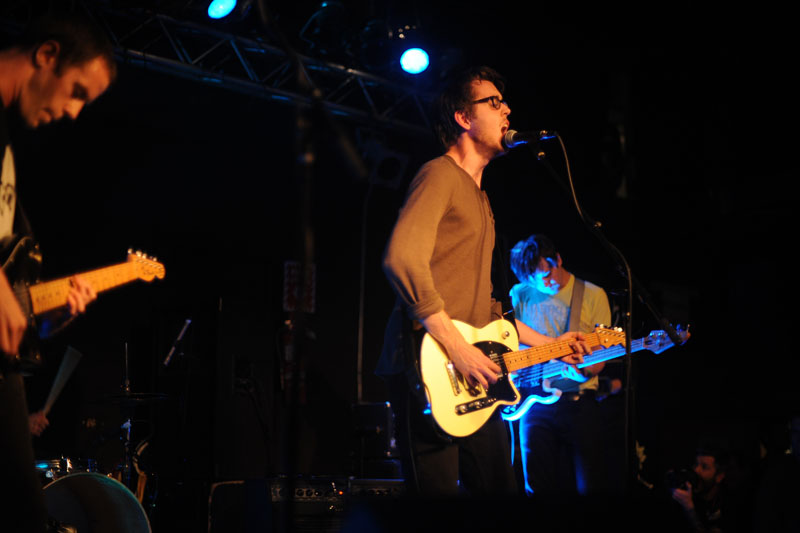
- Cloud Nothings play MTV's Hive's live in Boston

Background information
- Origin: Cleveland, Ohio, U.S.
- Genres: Indie rock; noise rock; post-hardcore; post-punk revival; emo
- Years active: 2009–present
- Labels: Carpark; Wichita; Ghost Ramp; Pure Noise
- Members: Dylan Baldi; Jayson Gerycz; Chris Brown
- Past members: Joe Boyer; TJ Duke; Noah Depew
- Website: cloudnothings.com

Cloud Nothings is an American indie rock band from Cleveland, Ohio, United States, founded by singer-songwriter Dylan Baldi. It currently consists of lead singer and guitarist Dylan Baldi, drummer Jayson Gerycz, and bassist Chris Brown.

Beginning in 2009, the band originally started as a solo project, with Baldi recording both vocals and instrumentals in his parents' basement, although he performed live with a full band. The band was signed to Washington, D.C.–based Carpark Records. They are now signed to Pure Noise Records. Their breakthrough album, Attack on Memory, was released on Carpark in 2012. Their next LP, Here and Nowhere Else, was released on April 1, 2014. Cloud Nothings' album Life Without Sound was released on January 27, 2017. This was followed by Last Building Burning, released on October 19, 2018, the Bandcamp exclusive The Black Hole Understands on July 3, 2020, and The Shadow I Remember on February 26, 2021. Their debut on Pure Noise, Final Summer, was released on April 19, 2024.

== History ==
=== Formation (2009) ===
In 2009, Baldi spent his first semester as a freshman at Case Western Reserve University in Cleveland, with a major in music/audio recording technology. During weekends, Baldi returned to his parents' basement in Westlake, Ohio, to record music using GarageBand. He later created several fake bands, each with their own Myspace page on which Baldi featured his original music. Baldi created the music "for personal enjoyment, to see if I could write a song that was better than the last song I wrote." One of the fake bands Baldi created was Cloud Nothings. Underground rock promoter Todd Patrick, from New York City, invited the band to perform at Market Hotel in Brooklyn, New York, opening for the bands Woods and Real Estate. The invitation prompted Baldi to gather a band for the performance in December 2009. Realizing the potential success of the band, Baldi dropped out of college. He wrote an e-mail to his parents that explained his decision to work in music full-time. "They were cool with it," explained Baldi. "They trusted me. They've been supportive of me."

=== Turning On (2010) ===
Cloud Nothings' music caught the attention of Kevin Greenspan at Bridgetown Records who offered to release the eight song EP Turning On featuring the single "Hey Cool Kid". A month later Speaker Tree Records released a vinyl edition of Turning On with an additional track (Strummin'). Carpark Records signed Cloud Nothings as a one-man band in 2010 and released an expanded Turning On now featuring 13 songs. Uncut's John Robinson awarded Turning On 4 stars saying the music was "tuneful, witty and sounds fantastic". Spin's Josh Modell wrote that "Baldi has a melodic knack that approaches Guided By Voices at their prime". The single "Didn't You" was featured in the 2013 film Chlorine.

=== Cloud Nothings (2011) ===
Following American and European tours Baldi worked with producer Chester Gwazda in his Baltimore studio and released Cloud Nothings in January 2011. The album received favorable reviews. Pitchfork Media's David Bevan gave the self-titled album a 7.9 out of 10, writing "the result is another fantastic step forward" Meanwhile, NME's Thomas Ward rated the album with a 7 out of 10. Cloud Nothings is "a fun, frenetic and crisp debut that is more resplendent than his lo-fi scuzz." Under the Radar's Frank Valish wrote "Baldi's songs somehow manage to mix punk rock energy with pure pop tunefulness". Mischa Pearlman of Alternative Press awarded the album 4 stars describing the music as "upbeat rock 'n' roll, full of joyous reckless abandon and youthful exuberance".

=== Attack on Memory (2012–2013) ===
The band's third album, Attack on Memory, was released in January 2012. Recorded with producer/engineer Steve Albini at Electrical Audio. It was the first outing to feature the live lineup and the first album in 2012 to receive "Best New Music" status on Pitchfork.com. It received a score of 8.6 and was ranked No. 22 on their Album of the Year list for 2012. Rolling Stone's Jon Dolan awarded the album 3 1/2 stars and selected Cloud Nothings as the "Band to Watch". Spin rated it 9/10 and "Attack on Memory" reached No. 2 on the CMJ Radio charts. The band toured Europe, performed at the Fuji Rock Festival (Japan), Pitchfork Festival and made their debut television appearance on the Jimmy Fallon Show performing the single "Stay Useless". The band continued to tour throughout most of 2013 including Europe, Israel, Australia (Laneway Festival) and an appearance at the Coachella Music Festival.

=== Here and Nowhere Else and No Life for Me (2014–2015) ===
Their fourth album, Here and Nowhere Else was recorded with producer John Congleton at Water Music Studios and released April 1, 2014, on Carpark Records. The same day, they released the album's first single, "I'm Not Part of Me." and its accompanying video. The album was given an 8.7 out of 10 on Pitchfork and titled "Best New Music". Here and Nowhere Else reached No. 2 on the CMJ Radio charts and was favorably reviewed in a wide variety of music publications including Rolling Stone (3 1/2 stars) and Spin (8/10). Cloud Nothings again toured Europe, Australia, Japan and performed at a number of festivals including Bonnaroo, Pitchfork and the 2015 Coachella Music Festival. The single "I'm Not Part of Me" is featured on the 2015 Tony Hawk's Pro Skater 5 soundtrack and in the 2016 film Almost Friends.

No Life for Me, an album by Wavves and Cloud Nothings, was released in Europe on June 28, 2015, and worldwide on June 29, 2015.

=== Life Without Sound (2016–2017) ===
Their fifth album, Life Without Sound, was released on January 27, 2017, once again through Carpark Records. The album was engineered/produced/mixed by John Goodmanson (Death Cab for Cutie, Nada Surf, Sleater-Kinney) at Sonic Ranch in El Paso, Texas. With the announcement came the release of the album's first single, "Modern Act," which premiered on Pitchfork. Upon its release Uncut rates it 8/10 and praises it as "thrilling... Baldi successfully develops his own take on the merger of power pop and hardcore brawn...without sacrificing any of his irrepressible energy, or his enviable knack for hooks". Alternative Press (AP) awards it 4 1/2 stars and writes, "they sound bolder than ever, achieving a new peak...rife with memorable hooks and earworms – and the substance to make them meaningful". Guitarist, Chris Brown (Total Babes) joined the band as Cloud Nothings toured America, Europe and Asia (Japan, China, Singapore) over the first half of 2017. The band played a variety of dates throughout the summer including the Panorama and Lollapalooza Music Festivals. The band completed an autumn tour of North America supporting Japandroids and toured Australia in February. "Modern Act" appears in season 5/episode 12 of the CW series The Originals. "Internal World" is featured in season 2/episode 7 of The Netflix series 13 Reasons Why.

=== Last Building Burning (2018–2019) ===
Their sixth studio album, entitled Last Building Burning, was released on October 19, 2018, on Carpark Records. The album was recorded at Sonic Ranch, and was produced by Randall Dunn. A new song/video, "The Echo of the World," premiered on August 13. Following its release Under the Radar rated the album 8/10, stating "...Cloud Nothings have never been better." The Line of Best Fit rated the album 9/10, saying "Baldi and his conspirators have created something fantastic here – easily matching the scope and ambition of artists across the musical spectrum. They always seemed to be on the cusp of greatness, and Last Building Burning is their first step over that threshold." Pitchfork rated it 7.6, and singled out the track "Leave Him Now" as "Cloud Nothings at their best: direct, visceral, vulnerable. It hits in the gut and rings in the head, striking that golden ratio of ferocity and tunefulness that this band does best." The band completed a 2018 to 2019 world tour of North and South America, Asia and Europe including an appearance at the Bol Festival in Moscow. An autumn tour with Cursive and the Appleseed Cast took place from November through January 2020. The band has recorded a new album at Electric Audio Studios in Chicago with engineer/producer Steve Albini.

=== The Black Hole Understands (2020) ===
About a month into quarantine, Dylan Baldi and Jayson Gerycz started sending files back and forth, with guitars, bass and vocals recorded in Philadelphia while drums and mixing happened in Cleveland. The Black Hole Understands was self-released July 3, 2020, on Bandcamp. Pitchfork rated it 7.5/10, stating: "Despite being recorded in an era of unthinkable instability, it is the most assuredly melodic Cloud Nothings has sounded in years" and "Backed by gleaming harmonies, Cloud Nothings make the dulled ennui of everyday life sound like an escapist fantasy". NME awarded the album four stars, saying "It might be this sense of willing a better situation into existence that makes The Black Hole Understands such a vibrant, melody-packed joy".

=== The Shadow I Remember (2021–2023) ===
In October 2020, the band announced a new studio album, The Shadow I Remember. The announcement was accompanied by a new single, "Am I Something." The Shadow I Remember was produced by Steve Albini at Electrical Audio in Chicago and released February 26, 2021, on Carpark Records. Consequence of Sound wrote "The Shadow I Remember sees Cloud Nothings reunite with celebrated producer Steve Albini of Electrical Audio almost a decade after they had previously collaborated on their album Attack on Memory. What resulted is a record that's heartening, human, and sonically explosive". DIY declared it "Raw and uncompromising, yet always harbouring a degree of melody, it's the product of ten years of learning, and succeeds in deftly balancing subtle nuance with a sense of uncompromising aggression". Pitchfork rated it 7.2 and exclaimed "As the Cleveland band returns to Electrical Audio at full force, they retain their penchant for rueful concision and world-weary chronicles of pandemic existence." Exclaim! states that "The Shadow I Remember is the quintessential Cloud Nothings album" and "perfectly encapsulates everything the band do so well, and hints at what might be to come The band celebrated the release with a livestream performance of the album from the Grog Shop in Cleveland, Ohio, on February 27, 2021. The band returned to live performances with a show at the Rock and Roll Hall of Fame on July 19 followed by an autumn tour of the U.S. including an appearance at the Shaky Knees Festival in Atlanta, Georgia. The band toured with PUP in April and played Riot Fest in Chicago on September 16. They marked the tenth anniversary of their landmark album Attack on Memory with a fall tour of the east and west coasts and a limited edition sky blue vinyl reissue (January 20, 2023) which includes two unreleased songs from the Steve Albini produced sessions. Prior to their Riot Fest performance and the Attack on Memory tour, bassist TJ Duke left the band and was replaced by Noah Depew. Depew departed the band in early 2023, with Brown switching to bass and converting the band back into a trio.

On November 1, 2023, it was announced that Cloud Nothings had signed to Pure Noise Records, on which they released the single, "Final Summer". The band then began an autumn North American tour with labelmates The Menzingers, Microwave, and Rodeo Boys. "Final Summer" was later revealed to be the title track to the band's eighth studio album, released on April 19, 2024. A second single from the album, "Running Through the Campus", was released to coincide with the album's announcement.

=== Final Summer (2024) ===
The band's ninth album and first on Pure Noise Records was released on April 19, 2024. Tracked by Jeff Zeigler, mixed by Sarah Tudzin and mastered by Jack Callahan. The cover art was a photograph taken by Baldi when Cloud Nothings performed a show in Wollongong on their Australian tour that past April. Following its release Pop Matters headlined "Cloud Nothings’ ‘Final Summer’ is a masterclass in Indie Rock". Pitchfork awarded the album a 7.5 and exclaimed "With spruced-up production highlighting new subtleties in their sound, yet never abandoning their melodic fundamentals, the Cleveland indie rockers’ latest radiates a renewed sense of purpose." adding "Cloud Nothings have never sounded so committed to going the distance." Flood Magazine wrote, "The sentiments are warmer, perhaps, but Cloud Nothings haven't softened. The band's energy level never slackens throughout Final Summer, and the entirety of the record's half-hour run time sounds massive, even at its most deceptively simple. But in moments like 'I'd Get Along,' a towering anthem in which Baldi wrings every last ounce of power from only two lines, Cloud Nothings reveal how much artistic growth they've undergone." The band kicked off a headlining tour of the U.S. on May 5.

A 10th anniversary edition of Here and Nowhere Else was released on October 2 which included extra live tracks from 2014 to 2015 followed by a national fall tour including select dates opening for Rise Against.

=== Tours (2025-26) ===
Following west coast datesthe band supported national tours by Sunny Day Real Estate,Superheaven, and Teen Suicide.After performing at Bazooka Fest and some east coast dates the band will tour the UK, Spain and Portugal in the fall.

== Musical style and influences ==
A hallmark of the band's sound is its strong sense of melody and hooks. Consequence said the band's melodies are augmented by "layers of fuzz and propulsion". Lyrical themes in the band usually include self-deprecation, adolecence, and regret. Staff writer Zak Ruksin said: "These are songs about growing up, hating life, and repeating the same mistakes. Isn’t that what pop punk is really about anyway?"

Baldi has cited numerous bands and artists as influences, including Wipers, the Lemonheads, the Forms, Life Without Buildings, Women, No Age, Deerhunter, Black Sabbath, Nina Hagen, Killdozer, Zounds, Thin Lizzy, Swell Maps.

== Members ==
=== Current ===
- Dylan Baldi – lead vocals, guitar (2009–present), bass, drums (2009–2010)
- Jayson Gerycz – drums (2010–present)
- Chris Brown – bass (2023–present), backing vocals (2016–present), guitar, keyboards (2016–2023)

=== Former ===
- Joe Boyer – guitar, backing vocals (2010–2013)
- TJ Duke – bass, backing vocals (2010–2022)
- Noah Depew – bass (2022–2023)

== Discography ==
=== Albums ===
==== Studio albums ====
List of albums, with selected chart positions
Title	Album details	Peak chart positions									
Title	Album details	US	US Alt.	US Indie	US Rock	AUS Hit.	BEL (FL)	BEL (WA)	UK Indie	UK Rec.	UK Rock
Cloud Nothings	Released: January 24, 2011; Label: Carpark	—	—	—	—	—	—	—	—	—	—
Attack on Memory	Released: January 24, 2012; Label: Carpark, Wichita	121	25	21	37	—	—	—	41	—	—
Here and Nowhere Else	Released: April 1, 2014; Label: Carpark, Wichita	50	12	12	16	8	80	—	30	26	—
Life Without Sound	Released: January 27, 2017; Label: Carpark, Wichita	— (Note: Life Without Sound did not enter the US Billboard 200, but peaked at number 60 on the US Album Sales Chart.)	—	15	—	—	—	103	48	18	19
Last Building Burning	Released: October 19, 2018; Label: Carpark, Wichita	— (Note: Last Building Burning did not enter the US Billboard 200, but peaked at number 98 on the US Top Current Album Sales Chart.)	—	23	—	—	—	—	— (Note: Last Building Burning did not enter the UK Independent Albums chart, but peaked at number 14 on the UK Independent Album Breakers chart.)	—	—
The Black Hole Understands	Released: July 3, 2020; Label: Self-released on Bandcamp	— (Note: The Black Hole Understands did not enter the US Billboard 200, but peaked at number 78 on the US Top Current Album Sales Chart.)	—	—	—	—	—	—	—	—	—
The Shadow I Remember	Released: February 26, 2021; Label: Carpark	— (Note: The Shadow I Remember did not enter the US Billboard 200, but peaked at number 65 on the US Album Sales Chart.)	—	—	—	—	—	—	—	17	—
Final Summer	Released: April 19, 2024; Label: Pure Noise	—	—	—	—	—	—	—	—	—	—
What Kind of Hell Did You Survive?	Released: January 29, 2027; Label: Pure Noise	—	—	—	—	—	—	—	—	—	—
"—" denotes a recording that did not chart or was not released in that territory.

==== Live albums ====
- Live at the Grog Shop (2012)
- live at red palace (2022)

===== Bandcamp bootleg series =====
- Live @ Webster Hall, NYC 1/2/17 (2020)
- Live @ WFMU 12/1/18 (2020)
- Live @ Underground, Cologne 5/17/14 (2020)
- Live @ The Social, Orlando 4/21/14 (2020)
- Live @ The Riot Room, Kansas City 4/29/14 (2020)
- Live @ The Grog Shop, Cleveland 4/5/12 (2020)
- Live @ The Button Factory, Dublin 5/24/14 (2020)
- Live @ Scala, London 5/27/14 (2020)
- Live @ Mohawk, Austin 4/26/14 (2020)
- Live @ Melkweg, Amsterdam 5/19/14 (2020)
- Live @ Lowlands Festival, Holland 8/17/12 (2020)
- Live @ Loppen, Copenhagen 5/15/14 (2020)
- Live @ Les Nuits Botanique, Brussels 5/18/14 (2020)
- Live @ Landmark, Bergen 5/12/14 (2020)
- Live @ La Fleche d'Or, Paris 5/20/14 (2020)
- Live @ Knitting Factory, NYC 6/24/10 (2020)
- Live @ KCRW Morning Becomes Eclectic 2/22/17 (2020)
- Live @ John Dee, Oslo 5/13/14 (2020)
- Live @ Gasa Gasa, NOLA 4/24/14 (2020)
- Live @ Fitzgeralds, Houston 4/25/14 (2020)
- Live @ Daytrotter 8/5/10 (2020)
- Live @ Cypress Avenue, Cork 5/28/14 (2020)
- Live @ Crowbar, Tampa 4/22/14 (2020)
- Live @ Cat's Cradle, Carrboro 4/17/14 (2020)
- Live @ Brudenell Social Club, Leeds 5/26/14 (2020)
- Live @ Bells Brewery, Kalamazoo 1/15/15 (2020)

==== Collaborative albums ====
- No Life for Me (with Wavves) (2015)

==== Bandcamp exclusive albums ====
- Life is Only One Event (2020)

=== EPs ===
- Turning On (2009; re-released 2010 and 2021)

==== Bandcamp exclusive EPs ====
- August 2020 (2020)
- September 2020 (2020)
- October 2020 (2020)
- November 2020 (2020)
- December 2020 (2020)
- January 2021 (2021)
- February 2021 (2021)
- March 2021 (2021)
- April 2021 (2021)
- May 2021 (2021)
- June 2021 (2021)
- July 2021 (2021)

=== Singles ===
List of singles, with selected chart positions and certifications
Title	Year	Peak chart positions		Album
Title	Year	MEX Air.	UK Sales	Album
"Hey Cool Kid"	2010	—	87	Turning On
"Didn't You"	2010	—	—	non-album single
"Should Have"	2011	—	51	Cloud Nothings
"Understand At All"	2011	—	—	Cloud Nothings
"Nothing's Wrong"	2011	—	—	Cloud Nothings
"Forget You All the Time"	2011	—	—	Cloud Nothings
"For No Reason"	2011	—	—	non-album single
"No Future/No Past"	2012	—	—	Attack on Memory
"Stay Useless"	2012	—	—	Attack on Memory
"Fall In"	2012	—	—	Attack on Memory
"I'm Not Part of Me"	2014	50	—	Here and Nowhere Else
"Now Hear In"	2014	42	—	Here and Nowhere Else
"Psychic Trauma"	2014	—	—	Here and Nowhere Else
"Modern Act"	2016	—	—	Life Without Sound
"Internal World"	2017	—	—	Life Without Sound
"Up To the Surface"	2017	—	—	Life Without Sound
"The Echo of the World"	2018	—	—	Last Building Burning
"Leave Him Now"	2018	—	—	Last Building Burning
"So Right So Clean"	2018	—	—	Last Building Burning
"Am I Something"	2020	—	—	The Shadow I Remember
"The Spirit Of"	2020	—	—	The Shadow I Remember
"Nothing Without You"	2021	—	—	The Shadow I Remember
"Final Summer"	2023	—	—	Final Summer
"Running Through The Campus"	2024	—	—	Final Summer
"Death Keeps Me Alive"	2026	—	—	What Kind of Hell Did You Survive?
"—" denotes releases that did not chart

== See also ==
- List of indie rock musicians
- List of noise musicians
- List of post-hardcore bands
- Music of Ohio
