= Pom Pom Squad =

American rock band

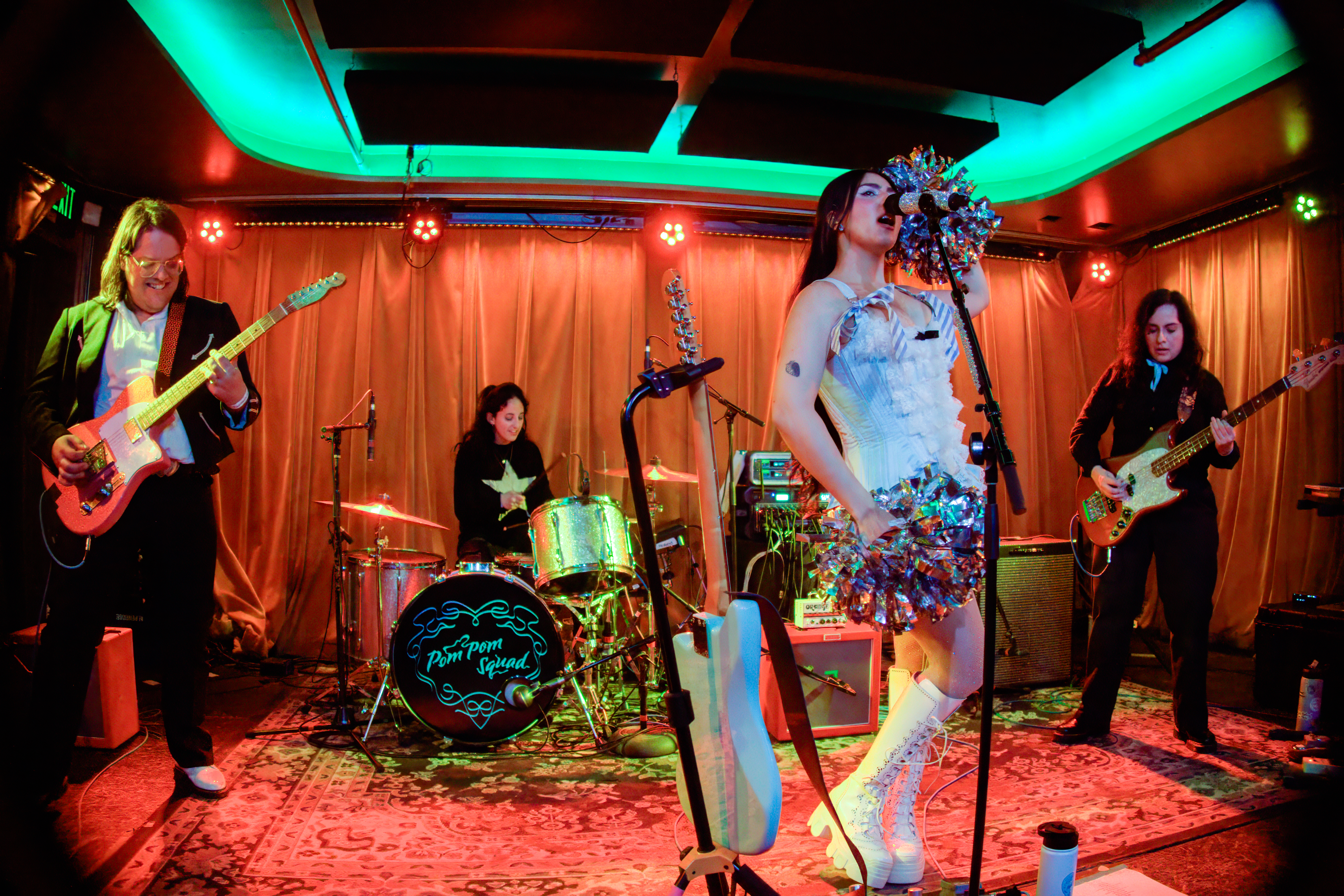
- Pom Pom Squad in 2025

Background information
- Origin: Brooklyn, New York, U.S.
- Genres: Indie rock; alternative rock; grunge; pop punk
- Years active: 2015–present
- Label: City Slang
- Members: Mia Berrin; Shelby Keller; Alex Mercuri; Lauren Marquez
- Website: pompomsquadband.com

Pom Pom Squad is an American indie rock/grunge band from Brooklyn, New York. It is the solo project of frontwoman Mia Berrin, and features permanent members Shelby Keller (drums), Alex Mercuri (guitar) and Lauren Marquez (bass and keys). They released the extended plays Hate It Here in 2018 and Ow in 2019 before releasing their debut studio album Death of a Cheerleader in 2021. They toured extensively in the years following, opening for musicians Pvris and Bartees Strange before releasing their second album Mirror Starts Moving Without Me in 2024 to positive reviews. On August 6 in 2025, Mia announced on Facebook that they were an independent indie band again without any label.

== History ==
=== Origins, Hate it Here and Ow EPs (2015–2017) ===
Mia Berrin (Daughter of Hip-Hop artist MC Serch), was born and raised on Long Island, New York, grew up in Detroit, Michigan, and attended a private high school in Orlando, Florida. She began Pom Pom Squad when she was eighteen years old. She soon moved to New York City to attend New York University, where she performed solo under the name Pom Pom Squad and studied at the Clive Davis Institute. She also began performing with an early iteration of the band, with whom she released the EP Hate It Here in 2017. Berrin is of African-American and Puerto Rican descent, Jewish, and is queer. She is outspoken about the influence her identity has on her music.

Berrin later met bassist Mari Alé Figeman and drummer Shelby Keller at club show and reformed the band. Alex Mercuri became the permanent fourth member. Pom Pom Squad released their EP Ow in September 2019. The band built critical buzz during this time and were booked for multiple SXSW showcases as well as supporting tour dates with the Front Bottoms and Disq; these dates in 2020 were ultimately cancelled due to the COVID-19 pandemic. During 2020, Pom Pom Squad released a series of covers and an original single, "Red with Love."

=== Death of a Cheerleader (2021–2023) ===
On March 2, 2021, it was announced that Pom Pom Squad had signed with the Berlin independent label City Slang. With the announcement, the band released the single "Lux." They announced their first full-length album Death of a Cheerleader, produced by Sarah Tudzin of Illuminati Hotties, and shared the single "Head Cheerleader" in April, followed by the third and final single "Crying". Death of a Cheerleader was released on June 25, 2021.

In 2022, Pom Pom Squad toured alongside Illuminati Hotties and Fenne Lily before embarking on the Death of a Cheerleader tour. They played an NPR Tiny Desk Concert at SXSW and performed as the opening act for PUP and Bartees Strange. Their song "Shame Reactions" was featured on the soundtrack for the teen comedy film Do Revenge. In 2023, Pom Pom Squad served as the opening act for the Godless/Goddess Tour, which was co-headlined by Pvris and Poppy.

=== Mirror Starts Moving Without Me (2024–present) ===
In June 2024, Pom Pom Squad released their single "Downhill." It was the band's first release of new music since 2021. On July 30, the single "Spinning" was released, and the band's upcoming album Mirror Starts Moving Without Me was announced. Mirror Starts Moving Without Me was recorded at Electric Lady Studios and inspired by "the endless feedback and expectations" Berrin experienced after releasing Death of a Cheerleader and a crisis of self. For the album Berrin adopted a darker aesthetic, influenced by video games, anime and the 1951 Disney film Alice in Wonderland, and cited disco and Prince as influencing the album's sound. Mirror Starts Moving Without Me was released on October 25, 2024, to positive reviews. Josh Korngut of Exclaim! awarded the release an 8/10 rating for "deconstructing postmodern grunge pop and embracing nostalgia with a sharp, contemporary edge." The band will embark on the Mirror Ball Tour in 2025.

== Members ==
- Mia Berrin – lead vocals, guitar (2015–present)
- Shelby Keller – drums (2018–present)
- Alex Mercuri – guitar (2018–present)
- Lauren Marquez – bass (2022–present)

Touring members

- Alina Sloan – bass (2022–present)

Former members

- Ethan Sass – guitar (2019)
- Mari Alé Figeman – bass (2018–2021)
- Camellia Hartman – touring violin, backing vocals (2022)
- Daisy Spencer – touring bass (2021)

== Discography ==
Adapted from Bandcamp.

=== Studio albums ===
- Death of a Cheerleader (2021)
- Mirror Starts Moving Without Me (2024)

=== EPs ===
- Hate It Here (2018)
- Ow (2019)

=== Singles ===
- "Hate It Here" (2018)
- "Heavy Heavy" (2019)
- "Honeysuckle" (2019)
- "Cherry Blossom" (2019)
- "Cellophane" (FKA Twigs cover) (2020)
- "Red with Love" (2020)
- "Crimson + Clover" (Tommy James and the Shondells cover) (2020)
- "Hello Santa Claus" (2020)
- "Lux" (2021)
- "Head Cheerleader" (2021)
- "Crying" (2021)
- "Until It Stops" (2021)
- "Popular" (Nada Surf cover) (2021)
- "Downhill" (2024)
- "Spinning" (2024)
- ”Street Fighter” (2024)

=== As featured artist ===
- "Trip Around the Sun" (MisterWives feat. Pom Pom Squad)

== Covers ==
In 2020, Pom Pom Squad released their version of "Crimson and Clover" and donated all of the proceeds to For the Gworls Medical Fund. It was featured in episode 5 of the 2022 Willow. The band released the single "Until It Stops" in November 2021 as part of Spotify's Fresh Finds program. In December 2021, the band released a cover of Nada Surf's hit "Popular," featuring their vocalist/guitarist Matthew Caws on backing vocals. The accompanying video replicated Nada Surf's 1996 video shot for shot, with Berrin playing each of the major characters. Pom Pom Squad's video was filmed at the same location as the original video. The band has also covered "Cellophane" by FKA Twigs.
