= I Am the Dog =

2023 debut studio album by Sir Chloe

Studio album by Sir Chloe
- Released: May 19, 2023
- Studios: Sunset Sound; EastWest; Sargent
- Length: 35:59
- Label: Atlantic
- Producer: John Congleton

Sir Chloe chronology
Party Favors (2020)	I Am the Dog (2023)	Swallow the Knife (2025)

Singles from I Am the Dog
- 1. "Hooves" Released: February 23, 2023; 2. "Salivate" Released: March 23, 2023; 3. "Know Better" Released: April 20, 2023

I Am the Dog is the debut studio album from American indie rock band Sir Chloe. It was released by Atlantic Records on May 19, 2023.

The album was supported by three singles before release: "Hooves", "Salivate", and "Know Better". Upon release, I Am the Dog was met with positive reviews from critics.

== Background ==
Sir Chloe released their debut EP, Party Favors in 2020, after gaining widespread popularity when their song "Michelle" went viral on TikTok. In 2022, they released non-album singles "Company" and "Mercy".

== Promotion and release ==
I Am the Dog was announced by Sir Chloe on February 23, 2023. The first single from the album, "Hooves" was released the same day. They released the second single, "Salivate" on March 23, 2023. The third single, "Know Better" was released on April 20, 2023. The album was released on May 19, 2023.

In 2023, Sir Chloe did their first headlining tour, "I am the tour", in promotion of the album. They were also a supporting act for Beck and Phoenix's Summer Odyssey tour in 2023.

== Critical reception ==
Professional ratings
Review scores
Source	Rating
AllMusic	4/5 stars
DIY	4/5 stars
The Line of Best Fit	9/10
Spectrum Culture	86%

I Am the Dog was met with positive reviews from critics, being described as "strong entry amongst [2023]'s releases" by The Line of Best Fit, and "a remarkable debut" by Spectrum Culture. DIY rated the album four stars and called it a "solid record."

== Track listing ==
I Am the Dog track listing
No.	Title	Writer(s)	Length
1.	"Should I"	Dana Foote; Teddy O'Mara; Teddy Geiger	2:28
2.	"Salivate"	Foote; O'Mara; John Congleton	2:27
3.	"Center"	Foote; O'Mara; Sarah Tudzin	3:56
4.	"Know Better"	Foote; O'Mara; Geiger	3:11
5.	"Leash"	Foote; O'Mara; Congleton	3:28
6.	"Hooves"	Foote; O'Mara; Congleton; Tudzin	2:43
7.	"Obsession"	Foote; O'Mara	3:34
8.	"Daddy's Car"	Foote; O'Mara	3:24
9.	"Cake"	Foote; O'Mara	3:20
10.	"I Am the Dog"	Foote; O'Mara	3:32
11.	"Feel Again"	Foote; O'Mara	3:49
Total length:			35:59

== Personnel ==
Credits adapted from the album's liner notes.

=== Sir Chloe ===
- Zach Dawes – bass guitar (tracks 1, 4, 6–9, 11)
- Dana Foote – vocals (all tracks), guitar (8, 10, 11)
- Palmer Foote – additional percussion (8, 10)
- Austin Holmes – keyboards (8, 10, 11)
- Teddy O'Mara – guitars (all tracks), keyboards (1–5, 7, 9), drum programming (6)
- Emma Welch – background vocals (10)

=== Additional contributors ===
- Carla Azar – drums, percussion (1–10)
- Zac Rae – bass guitar (2, 3, 5, 10), drum programming (3, 6), keyboards (3)
- Joey Waronker – drums (11)
- John Congleton – production, engineering, mixing
- Clint Welander – additional engineering
- Cory McCormick – engineering assistance
- Bernie Grundman – mastering
- Molly Hawkins – creative direction
- Bradley Pinkerton – graphic design, layout
- Drew Heffron – logo typography
- Grant Spanier – photography
- Russ Fraser – director of photography
- Patience Hardling – production design
