= Let Me Do One More =

2021 studio album by Illuminati Hotties

Studio album by Illuminati Hotties
- Released: October 1, 2021
- Genres: Indie rock, punk rock
- Length: 40:55
- Labels: Snack Shack Tracks, Hopeless Records
- Producer: Sarah Tudzin

Illuminati Hotties chronology
Free I.H: This Is Not the One You've Been Waiting For (2020)	Let Me Do One More (2021)	Power (2024)

Let Me Do One More is the second studio album by American indie rock band Illuminati Hotties. It was released under Hopeless Records and co-released under the band's own imprint label, Snack Shack Tracks on October 1, 2021. The album features collaborations from Alex Menne, the singer of Great Grandpa and Buck Meek, the guitarist of Big Thief. The album was mostly written before the band's last release, Free I.H: This Is Not the One You've Been Waiting For.

== Background ==
Let Me Do One More was largely written before the band's last mixtape, Free I.H: This Is Not the One You've Been Waiting For. The New York Times reported that because Sarah Tudzin, the bandleader of Illuminati Hotties, did not want Let Me Do One More "to arrive on the embattled label [Tiny Engines]", she wrote the mixtape, Free I.H: This Is Not the One You've Been Waiting For to complete a contractual agreement with the label. Let Me Do One More was released under Hopeless Records and the band's own label, Snack Shack Tracks, which was first launched during the release of "Mmmoooaaaaayaya", the album's first single.

== Reception ==
Professional ratings
Aggregate scores
Source	Rating
Metacritic	87/100
Review scores
Source	Rating
AllMusic	4/5 stars
Exclaim!	8/10
The Line of Best Fit	8/10
No Ripcord	9/10
Paste	8.5/10
Pitchfork	8.0/10
PopMatters	8/10

At Metacritic, which assigns a normalized rating out of 100 to reviews from professional publications, Let Me Do One More received an average score of 87, based on 12 reviews, indicating "universal acclaim". Alex Hudson of Exclaim! called the album "12 songs of impeccably crafted pop hooks, hyperactive crescendos and graceful comedowns".

=== Accolades ===
Let Me Do One More on year-end lists
Publication	List	Rank	Ref.
Pitchfork	The 50 Best Albums of 2021	35	

== Track listing ==
No.	Title	Length
1.	"Pool Hopping"	3:07
2.	"MMMOOOAAAAAYAYA"	3:04
3.	"Knead"	3:27
4.	"Threatening Each Other re: Capitalism"	4:43
5.	"u v v p"	4:44
6.	"Protector"	4:31
7.	"Joni: LA's No. 1 Health Goth"	3:37
8.	"Kickflip"	2:24
9.	"Toasting"	0:37
10.	"The Sway"	3:35
11.	"Cheap Shoes"	2:59
12.	"Growth"	4:08
Total length:		40:55
