= Kiss Yr Frenemies =

Studio album by Illuminati Hotties
- Released: May 11, 2018
- Genre: Rock
- Label: Tiny Engines

Illuminati Hotties chronology
Kiss Yr Frenemies (2018)	Free I.H: This Is Not the One You've Been Waiting For (2020)

Kiss Yr Frenemies is the debut album by the American indie rock band Illuminati Hotties. The album was released on May 11, 2018, under the Tiny Engines label.

== Background ==
After attending the Berklee College of Music, Sarah Tudzin, the bandleader of Illuminati Hotties, moved back to Los Angeles and worked as an audio engineer for Slowdive, Porches and Hamilton. Rolling Stone reported that Sarah Tudzin recorded Kiss Yr Frenemies in the studio where she was an assistant to Chris Coady. The album was released on Tiny Engines on May 11, 2018.

== Critical reception ==
Larry Fitzmaurice of Pitchfork gave the album a 7.3/10 rating.

On December 4, 2018, Stereogum published its best-50-albums-of-2018 ranked year-end list, placing Kiss Yr Frenemies at #19.

== Track listing ==
Kiss Yr Frenemies track listing
No.	Title	Length
1.	"Kiss Yr Frenemies"	0:58
2.	"(You're Better) Than Ever"	2:21
3.	"Shape of My Hands"	3:15
4.	"Cuff"	4:48
5.	"For Cheez (My Friend, Not the Food)"	3:59
6.	"Paying Off the Happiness"	2:31
7.	"Patience"	3:40
8.	"The Rules"	4:55
9.	"Boi"	0:57
10.	"Pressed 2 Death"	2:15
11.	"Declutter"	3:58
