= Power (Illuminati Hotties album) =

Studio album by Illuminati Hotties
- Released: August 23, 2024
- Genre: Indie rock
- Length: 37:33
- Label: Hopeless Records
- Producer: Sarah Tudzin

Illuminati Hotties chronology
Let Me Do One More (2021)	Power (2024)

Singles from Power
- 1. "Can't Be Still" Released: May 2, 2024; 2. "Didn't" Released: June 5, 2024

Power is the third studio album from American indie rock band Illuminati Hotties. The album was released on August 23, 2024.

Professional ratings
Aggregate scores
Source	Rating
AnyDecentMusic?	7.3/10
Metacritic	81/100
Review scores
Source	Rating
Dork	4/5 stars
Rolling Stone	4/5
Exclaim!	8/10
The Guardian	4/5
Paste	7.6/10
Pitchfork	7.5/10
Under the Radar	7.0/10

== Track listing ==
All tracks are written by Sarah Tudzin.

Power track listing
No.	Title	Length
1.	"Can't Be Still"	2:58
2.	"I Would Like, Still Love You"	2:55
3.	"Throw (Life Raft)"	3:46
4.	"Rot"	3:46
5.	"Falling In Love With Somebody Better"	2:48
6.	"The L"	3:04
7.	"Sleeping In"	3:18
8.	"Didn't (featuring Cavetown)"	2:33
9.	"You Are Not Who You Were"	3:03
10.	"What's The Fuzz"	2:31
11.	"YSL"	2:06
12.	"Power"	2:59
13.	"Everything Changes"	1:45
Total length:		37:08
