= Free I.H: This Is Not the One You've Been Waiting For =

Mixtape by Illuminati Hotties
- Released: July 17, 2020
- Genre: Pop, rock
- Label: Self released
- Producer: Sarah Tudzin

Illuminati Hotties chronology
Kiss Yr Frenemies (2018)	Free I.H: This Is Not the One You've Been Waiting For (2020)	Let Me Do One More (2021)

Free I.H: This Is Not the One You've Been Waiting For is a mixtape by American indie rock band Illuminati Hotties. It was self released on July 17, 2020. The mixtape comes after accusations to the band's former label, Tiny Engines, of violations of contractual agreements by their artists. The band bought out its contract with Tiny Engines with a cash settlement and royalties to the label on a future project. This situation inspired the creation of the mixtape, which was released to fulfill a contractual agreement with Tiny Engines.

== Background ==
The mixtape comes after the band's debut album, Kiss Yr Frenemies, which was released in 2018. Stevie Knipe of Adult Mom accused Tiny Engines, the band's former label, of a breach of contract due to the delayed payment of $8,000 in royalties. Other artists signed to the label also alleged that similar situations occurred. The co-founder of the record label, Chuck Daley, admitted to the delay of payments in an interview with Billboard.

Following the controversy, Illuminati Hotties decided to settle its contract in cash and royalties in a future project, inspiring the content and creation of this mixtape, which also fulfilled a contractual agreement with Tiny Engines. The album was largely written after beginning production of the album Let Me Do One More, which was released in 2021.

The title of the mixtape's lead single, "Will I Get Cancelled If I Write a Song Called, 'If You Were a Man, You’d Be So Cancelled'", was taken from text messages between band leader Sarah Tudzin and Sadie Dupuis, who suggested its use.

== Reception ==
Free I.H: This Is Not the One You've Been Waiting For
Aggregate scores
Source	Rating
Metacritic	82/100
Review scores
Source	Rating
Beats Per Minute	79/100
Exclaim!	8/10
The Line of Best Fit	8/10
NME	4/5 stars
No Ripcord	8/10
Pitchfork	7.6/10
Under the Radar	7.5/10 stars

On the review aggregator website Metacritic, Free I.H has a score of 82 out of 100 based on 7 reviews, indicating "universal acclaim". Ian Cohen of Stereogum called it "one of 2020’s most brash, defiant, and flat-out righteous projects", and Francesca Rose of Exclaim! wrote that Free I.H "shows how making music can be cathartic for an artist" while giving the album an 8/10. Juan Edgardo Rodriguez of No Ripcord also gave the album an 8/10, calling the mood of the album "rowdy and playful". Arielle Gordon of Pitchfork gave the album a 7.6/10, claiming that while it is shorter than the band's previous release, Kiss Yr Frenemies, it "packs in more stylistic variation and studio maneuvers".

== Track listing ==
No.	Title	Length
1.	"will i get cancelled if i write a song called, "if you were a man you'd be so cancelled""	1:14
2.	"free ppls"	2:03
3.	"freequent letdown"	1:57
4.	"melatonezone"	2:12
5.	"WATTBL"	1:23
6.	"free dumb"	2:08
7.	"content//bedtime"	4:14
8.	"free4all"	1:26
9.	"b yr own b"	2:03
10.	"K - HOT AM 818"	0:49
11.	"superiority complex (big noise)"	1:34
12.	"reasons 2 live"	2:13
Total length:		23:16
