= Deana Kiner =

American musician and composer (1992)

- Born: May 29, 1992 (age 34)
- Education: Berklee College of Music
- Occupations: Composer; multi-instrumentalist
- Father: Kevin Kiner

Deana Kiner (born May 29, 1992) is an American composer and multi-instrumentalist, known for her work on the soundtracks of Star Wars Rebels, Transformers: Robots in Disguise, and Star Wars: The Clone Wars.

== Career ==
Studying at the Berklee College of Music, Kiner began in the film scoring program but eventually switched to songwriting. She briefly worked at a Starbucks until her father, Kevin Kiner, convinced her to collaborate with him on a composition project, the Netflix documentary Making a Murderer.

She also worked as a composer on the Singaporean animated series Trese, released by Netflix on June 10, 2021.

In collaboration with her father, Ludwig Göransson, and Noah Gorelick, she composed the song "Igyah Kah", which the character Sabine Wren listens to in the first episode of the 2023 television series Star Wars: Ahsoka.

On July 28, 2024, Kiner participated in a panel at San Diego Comic-Con titled The Character of Music: The Art of Scoring for Animation Panel.

== Filmography ==
=== Film ===
Year	Title	Role	Notes
2015	The Adventures of Knickerbock Teetertop	Opening and closing theme	Short film
2015	Jedi with a GoPro 2	Composer	Video
2016	In the Shadow of the Hill	Additional music	Film
2016	Un verano en Manhattan	Additional music	Film
2016	The Curious Kitty & Friends	Additional music	Short film
2017	Inconceivable	Additional music	Film
2017	Tout nous sépare	Additional music	Film
2019	Summoners War: Friends & Rivals	Composer	Short film
2022	Samaritan	Additional music	Film
2024	I'm in Love with Edgar Allan Poe	Composer	Short film
2026	Why Cameras Can't See Birds	Opening and closing theme	Video

=== Television ===
Year	Title	Role	Notes
2014–16	Hell on Wheels	Additional music	27 episodes
2014–17	Transformers: Robots in Disguise	Additional music	71 episodes
2015–18	Making a Murderer	Additional music	20 episodes
2015–19	Jane the Virgin	Additional music	65 episodes
2016–18	Star Wars Rebels	Additional music	30 episodes
2018	Narcos: Mexico	Additional music	10 episodes
2018	Titans	Additional music	11 episodes
2018–19	Single Parents	Composer	23 episodes
2020	Star Wars: The Clone Wars	Additional music	12 episodes
2020	Single Parents	Main theme music	2 episodes
2021	Star Wars: The Bad Batch	Additional music	16 episodes
2021	Trese	Composer	6 episodes
2021	City on a Hill	Additional music	8 episodes
2022–23	Dark Winds	Composer	12 episodes
2024	Star Wars: The Bad Batch	Composer	6 episodes
2024	Star Wars: Tales of the Empire	Composer	3 episodes

== Personal life ==
Deana is the daughter of the composer Kevin Kiner. On May 12, 2023, she came out as a trans woman. She is also bisexual.
