= Illuminati Hotties =

American indie rock band

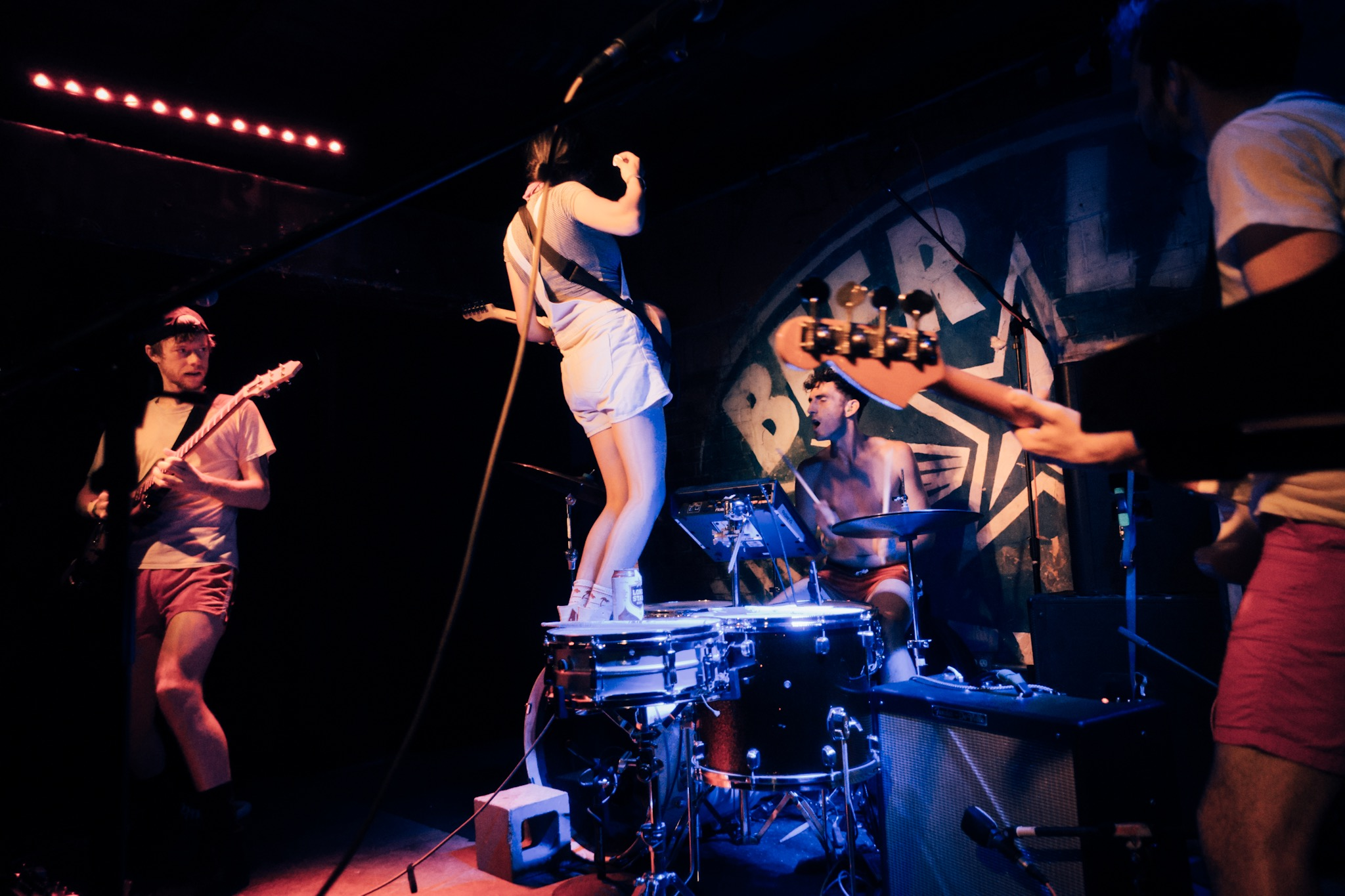
- Illuminati Hotties performing at SXSW in 2019

Background information
- Origin: Los Angeles, California
- Genres: Punk rock, indie rock
- Years active: 2017–present
- Labels: Tiny Engines; Hopeless Records; Snack Shack Tracks; Big Scary Monsters
- Members: Sarah Tudzin; Tim Kmet; Sapphire Jewell; Zach Bilson
- Website: illuminatihotties.bandcamp.com

Illuminati Hotties are an American indie rock band from Los Angeles, California, created and fronted by producer, mixer, and audio engineer Sarah Tudzin.

== History ==
Sarah Tudzin began her career in music as a recording engineer. The Illuminati Hotties project started as an extension of her work, as a way to demonstrate her varied production capabilities. In 2018, Tudzin and her band released their debut full-length album, Kiss Yr Frenemies, on Tiny Engines.

In October 2019, Tudzin released a song for download called "ppl plzr", with all proceeds from the track going to the suicide prevention group The Trevor Project.

After it had "leaked" on July 3, 2020, Illuminati Hotties announced a mixtape, Free I.H: This Is Not the One You've Been Waiting For, would be released that month. An interview with Stereogum on July 10 made it clear it was connected to "an exit agreement that allowed Tudzin to buy out her Tiny Engines contract with a cash settlement and a payment of royalties on a future project" and would be released on July 17.

On December 4, 2020, Illuminati Hotties contributed the song "xmas wish list (what we all asked for)" to the Christmas compilation 'Simply Having a Wonderful Compilation'.

In 2021, Tudzin announced she had partnered with Hopeless Records to create her own imprint label, Snack Shack Tracks. The first release on the imprint was the Illuminati Hotties song "MMMOOOAAAAAYAYA". On June 10, Illuminati Hotties released the single "Pool Hopping" and announced its third studio album, Let Me Do One More, that was released on October 1, 2021.

In 2023, Tudzin performed the vocals for "Igyah Kah", a song composed by Kevin and Deana Kiner, Ludwig Göransson and Noah Gorelick, used in the first episode of the Star Wars: Ahsoka TV series. The song was released as a part of the first volume of the first season's original soundtrack album on September 15, 2023.

On June 5, 2024, Tudzin announced the band's next album, Power which was released August 23.

On March 5, 2025, Tudzin released a song titled "777", which was co-produced by Melina Duterte of Jay Som. This was the lead single for the EP Nickel on the Fountain Floor, which was released on May 30, 2025.

On October 9, 2025, Illuminati Hotties featured on the single "Heavenhead" by Spanish Love Songs, from their EP "A Brief Intermission in the Flattening of Time", released November 21, 2025.

== Discography ==
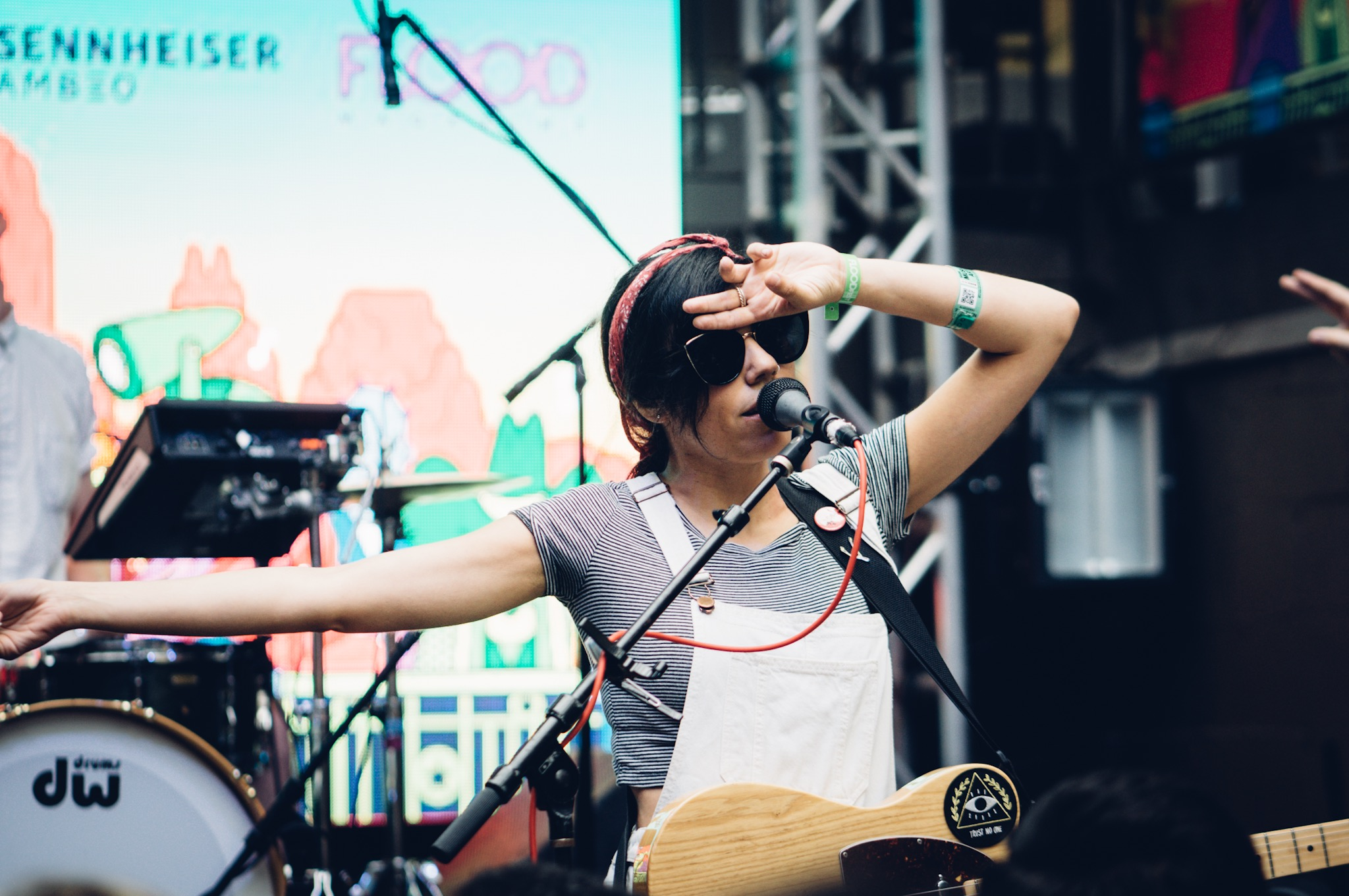
Sarah Tudzin performing in 2019

=== Albums ===
Year	Title
2018	Kiss Yr Frenemies
2021	Let Me Do One More
2024	Power

=== EPs ===
Year	Title
2025	Nickel on the Fountain Floor

=== Mixtapes ===
Year	Title
2020	FREE I.H: This Is Not the One You've Been Waiting For

=== Singles ===
Year	Title	Album
2017	"(You're Better) Than Ever"	Kiss Yr Frenemies
2017	"Cuff (Single Edit)"	Kiss Yr Frenemies
2018	"Insufficient Funds"	Song credited to A Place to Wash My Hands, a collaboration that included Tudzin
2019	"I Wanna Keep Yr Dog"	Non-album single
2019	"I Wanna Dance With Somebody (Who Loves Me)"	Non-album single
2019	"ppl plzr"	Non-album single
2019	"post-everything"	Non-album single
2020	"will i get cancelled if i write a song called, 'if you were a man you'd be so cancelled'"	FREE I.H: This Is Not the One You've Been Waiting For
2021	"MMMOOOAAAAAYAYA"	Let Me Do One More
2021	"Pool Hopping"	Let Me Do One More
2022	"Sandwich Sharer"	Non-album single
2023	"Truck"	Non-album single
2024	"Can't Be Still"	Non-album single
2024	"Didn't"	Power
2024	"Power"	Power
2024	"The L"	Power
2025	"777"	Nickel on the Fountain Floor
