= Consequence (website) =

American news website

- Website type: Music, film, and television news and reviews
- Available in: English
- Owner: Consequence Media
- Creators: Alex Young; (Founder & Publisher); Michael Roffman; (Co-Founder)
- Editors: Ben Kaye (Editorial Director)
- Parent: Consequence Media
- Website: consequence.net
- Commercial: Yes
- Registration: Optional
- Launched: 2007
- Current status: Active

Consequence (previously Consequence of Sound) is an independently owned New York-based online magazine featuring news, editorials, and reviews of music, movies, and television.

== History ==
Consequence of Sound was founded in September 2007 by Alex Young, then a student at Fordham University in The Bronx, New York. The website took its original name from the Regina Spektor song "Consequence of Sounds". In January 2008, Michael Roffman became Editor-in-Chief. In October 2014, Consequence of Sound began covering film and became a part of the Chicago Film Critics Association. In 2016, Consequence of Sound was reorganized under the umbrella of Consequence Media, a digital media, advertising, and marketing firm. In 2018, Consequence of Sound launched the Consequence Podcast Network, averaging over 100,000 downloads in its first month. Also in 2018, Consequence of Sound and Sony co-produced the music-history podcast series The Opus. Also in 2019, Consequence of Sound partnered with StubHub to launch a live content hub and events series.

In 2021, Consequence of Sound launched a redesign of their website, and rebranded to Consequence.

In 2022, Consequence launched its first cover story with Red Hot Chili Peppers.

In 2023, Consequence's partner company, Consequence Media, acquired Modern Drummer.

== Influence ==
Consequence is listed as one of the most influential music websites by Technorati. In 2010, About.com ranked Consequence the year's best music blog, based on "Technorati rankings and the online buzz throughout the year". In the Spring of 2014, Style of Sound calculated that Consequence charted as the second most influential music blog. In 2019, Consequence ranked among the top 10 most influential music blogs by Hypebot.

In 2009, Consequence reported that Paul McCartney and the Killers would headline the 2009 Coachella Valley Music and Arts Festival prior to its lineup announcement.

In 2015, Consequence was the first to break news of LCD Soundsystem's reunion tour.

In 2018, Consequence documented alleged abuse allegations against Dave Matthews Band violinist Boyd Tinsley. Boyd was later fired from the band.

== Annual report ==
=== Top 50 Albums ===
Year	Artist	Album	Top 5 Albums	Ref.
2008	TV on the Radio	Dear Science	2. Vampire Weekend – Vampire Weekend; 3. The Hold Steady – Stay Positive; 4. Portishead – Third; 5. Okkervil River – The Stand Ins	
2009	Animal Collective	Merriweather Post Pavilion	2. Passion Pit – Manners; 3. The Avett Brothers – I and Love and You; 4. The Decemberists – The Hazards of Love; 5. Phoenix – Wolfgang Amadeus Phoenix	
2010	Vampire Weekend	Contra	2. Kanye West – My Beautiful Dark Twisted Fantasy; 3. Arcade Fire – The Suburbs; 4. Gorillaz – Plastic Beach; 5. Titus Andronicus – The Monitor	
2011	St. Vincent	Strange Mercy	2. Bon Iver – Bon Iver; 3. Shabazz Palaces – Black Up; 4. PJ Harvey – Let England Shake; 5. Foo Fighters – Wasting Light	
2012	Frank Ocean	Channel Orange	2. Fiona Apple – The Idler Wheel…; 3. Kendrick Lamar – good kid, m.A.A.d city 4. Cloud Nothings – Attack on Memory; 5. Swans – The Seer	
2013	Kanye West	Yeezus	2. Vampire Weekend – Modern Vampires of the City; 3. My Bloody Valentine – m b v 4. CHVRCHES – The Bones of What You Believe; 5. Kurt Vile – Wakin on a Pretty Daze	
2014	The War On Drugs	Lost in the Dream	2. Run the Jewels – Run the Jewels 2; 3. Angel Olsen – Burn Your Fire for No Witness; 4. Cloud Nothings – Here and Nowhere Else; 5. Caribou – Our Love	
2015	Kendrick Lamar	To Pimp a Butterfly	2. Sufjan Stevens – Carrie & Lowell; 3. Grimes – Art Angels; 4. Oneohtrix Point Never – Garden of Delete; 5. Tame Impala – Currents	
2016	Beyoncé	Lemonade	2. Chance the Rapper – Coloring Book; 3. David Bowie – Blackstar; 4. Frank Ocean – Blonde; 5. Anohni – Hopelessness	
2017	Lorde	Melodrama	2. Kendrick Lamar – Damn; 3. Ryan Adams – Prisoner; 4. Vince Staples – Big Fish Theory; 5. Slowdive – Slowdive	
2018	Mitski	Be the Cowboy	2. Janelle Monáe – Dirty Computer; 3. Saba – Care for Me; 4. Kamasi Washington – Heaven and Earth; 5. Pusha T – Daytona	
2019	Billie Eilish	When We All Fall Asleep, Where Do We Go?	2. Sharon Van Etten – Remind Me Tomorrow; 3. Jamila Woods – Legacy! Legacy!; 4. Angel Olsen – All Mirrors; 5. Ariana Grande – Thank U, Next	
2020	Fiona Apple	Fetch the Bolt Cutters	2. Run the Jewels – RTJ4; 3. Phoebe Bridgers – Punisher; 4. Perfume Genius – Set My Heart on Fire Immediately; 5. Dua Lipa – Future Nostalgia	
2021	Tyler, the Creator	Call Me If You Get Lost	2. Japanese Breakfast – Jubilee; 3. Arlo Parks – Collapsed in Sunbeams; 4. Turnstile – Glow On; 5. Little Simz – Sometimes I Might Be Introvert	
2022	Pusha T	It's Almost Dry	2. Bad Bunny – Un Verano Sin Ti; 3. Beyoncé – Renaissance; 4. Yeah Yeah Yeahs – Cool It Down; 5. Zach Bryan – American Heartbreak	
2023	Yves Tumor	Praise a Lord Who Chews but Which Does Not Consume; (Or Simply, Hot Between Worlds)	2. Wednesday – Rat Saw God; 3. Sufjan Stevens – Javelin; 4. Billy Woods & Kenny Segal – Maps; 5. Caroline Polachek – Desire, I Want to Turn Into You	
2024	Charli XCX	Brat	2. Fontaines D.C. – Romance; 3. Waxahatchee – Tigers Blood; 4. Sturgill Simpson – Passage du Desir; 5. Beyoncé – Cowboy Carter	
2025	Rosalía	Lux	2. Geese – Getting Killed; 3. Clipse – Let God Sort Em Out; 4. FKA Twigs – Eusexua; 5. Deafheaven – Lonely People with Power	

=== Top 50 Songs ===
Year	Artist	Song	Top 5 Songs	Ref.
2009	Phoenix	"1901"	2. Animal Collective – "Summertime Clothes"; 3. Passion Pit – "Sleepyhead"; 4. Grizzly Bear – "Two Weeks"; 5. Phoenix – "Lisztomania"	
2010	Kanye West	"Power'"	2. LCD Soundsystem – "Dance Yrself Clean"; 3. The Black Keys – "Tighten Up"; 4. Vampire Weekend – "Cousins"; 5. Katy Perry – "Teenage Dream'"	
2011	Bon Iver	"Holocene'"	2. Tyler, the Creator – "Yonkers"; 3. M83 – "Midnight City"; 4. Beyoncé – "Countdown"; 5. Tune-Yards – "Bizness"	
2012	Frank Ocean	"Thinkin Bout You"	2. Japandroids – "The House That Heaven Built"; 3. Passion Pit – "I'll Be Alright"; 4. Grimes – "Genesis"; 5. Usher – "Climax"	
2013	Lorde	"Royals"	2. Kurt Vile – "Wakin on a Pretty Day"; 3. Kanye West – "New Slaves"; 4. Daft Punk – "Get Lucky"; 5. Phosphorescent – "Song for Zula"	
2014	Future Islands	"Seasons (Waiting on You)"	2. Cloud Nothings – "I'm Not Part of Me"; 3. Against Me! – "Transgender Dysphoria Blues"; 4. Flying Lotus – "Never Catch Me"; 5. Sia – "Chandelier"	
2015	Kendrick Lamar	"Alright"	2. Tame Impala – "Let It Happen"; 3. Jamie xx – "I Know There's Gonna Be (Good Times)"; 4. Kurt Vile – "Pretty Pimpin"; 5. Grimes – "Realiti"	
2016	Beyoncé	"Freedom"	2. Kanye West – "Ultralight Beam"; 3. Car Seat Headrest – "Drunk Drivers / Killer Whales"; 4. ANOHNI – "4 Degrees"; 5. David Bowie – "I Can't Give Everything Away"	
2017	Kendrick Lamar	"HUMBLE."	2. Lorde – "Green Light"; 3. Portugal. The Man – "Feel It Still"; 4. SZA – "Love Galore"; 5. Migos – "T-Shirt"	
2018	Kendrick Lamar and SZA	"All the Stars"	2. Ariana Grande – "God Is a Woman"; 3. Janelle Monáe – "Make Me Feel"; 4. Cardi B – "I Like It"; 5. Kanye West – "Ghost Town"	
2019	Sharon Van Etten	"Seventeen"	2. Billie Eilish – "Bad Guy"; 3. Lizzo – "Juice"; 4. Tyler, the Creator – "Earfquake"; 5. Strand of Oaks – "Weird Ways"	
2020	The Weeknd	"Blinding Lights"	2. Phoebe Bridgers – "I Know the End"; 3. BTS – "Dynamite"; 4. Run the Jewels – "Ooh La La"; 5. Waxahatchee – "Fire"	
2021	BTS	"Butter"	2. Lucy Dacus – "Thumbs"; 3. Lil Nas X – "Montero (Call Me by Your Name)"; 4. Japanese Breakfast – "Be Sweet"; 5. Tyler, the Creator – "Lumberjack"	
2022	Paramore	"This Is Why"	2. Pusha T – "Diet Coke"; 3. Big Thief – "Simulation Swarm"; 4. Beyoncé – "Cuff It"; 5. Bartees Strange – "Heavy Heart"	
2023	Mitski	"My Love Mine All Mine"	2. Zach Bryan – "East Side of Sorrow"; 3. Blondshell – "Salad"; 4. McKinley Dixon – "Tyler Forever"; 5. Ice Spice – "In Ha Mood"	
2024	Kendrick Lamar	"Not Like Us"	2. Fontaines D.C. – "Starburster"; 3. Charli XCX feat. Lorde – "Girl, So Confusing"; 4. Chappell Roan – "Good Luck, Babe!"; 5. Waxahatchee feat. MJ Lenderman – "Right Back to It"	
2025	Geese	"Au Pays du Cocaine"	2. FKA Twigs – "Girl Feels Good"; 3. Clipse feat. Stove God Cooks – "F.I.C.O."; 4. Turnstile – "BIRDS"; 5. Perfume Genius – "It's a Mirror"	

=== Artist, Band and Rookie of the Year ===
Year	Artist	Ref.	Band	Ref.	Rookie	Ref.
2010	Kanye West		The Roots		Not Awarded	
2011	James Blake		Foo Fighters		The Weeknd	
2012	Frank Ocean		Death Grips		Angel Haze	
2013	Kanye West		Arcade Fire		HAIM	
2014	Run the Jewels		The War on Drugs		FKA twigs	
2015	Kendrick Lamar		Tame Impala		Vince Staples	
2016	Chance the Rapper		Bruce Springsteen and the E Street Band		Car Seat Headrest	
2017	Lorde		King Gizzard and the Lizard Wizard		BROCKHAMPTON	
2018	Janelle Monáe		Pearl Jam		Billie Eilish	
2019	Billie Eilish		Tool		King Princess	
2020	Phoebe Bridgers		BTS		Beabadoobee	
2021	Lil Nas X		CHVRCHES		Nandi Bushell	
2022	Harry Styles		MUNA		Nova Twins	
2023	Taylor Swift		Foo Fighters		Blondshell	
2024	Jack White		Fontaines D.C.		English Teacher	
2025	Clipse		Turnstile		Lambrini Girls	

=== Top 25 Films ===
Year	Film	Top 5 Films	Ref.
2014	Under the Skin	2. Nightcrawler; 3. Boyhood; 4. Whiplash; 5. The Grand Budapest Hotel	
2015	Mad Max: Fury Road	2. The Look of Silence; 3. Inside Out; 4. Sicario; 5. The Revenant	
2016	Moonlight	2. Green Room; 3. Manchester by the Sea; 4. The Handmaiden; 5. La La Land	
2017	Blade Runner 2049	2. The Florida Project; 3. Dunkirk; 4. Call Me by Your Name; 5. Lady Bird	
2018	Hereditary	2. Eighth Grade; 3. BlacKkKlansman; 4. Paddington 2; 5. If Beale Street Could Talk	
2019	Once Upon a Time... in Hollywood	2. Midsommar; 3. Parasite; 4. Her Smell; 5. 1917	
2020	Lovers Rock	2. The Invisible Man; 3. Minari; 4. Da 5 Bloods; 5. Palm Springs	
2021	Zola	2. The Green Knight; 3. Annette; 4. Dune; 5. The French Dispatch	
2022	Glass Onion: A Knives Out Mystery	2. Everything Everywhere All At Once; 3. Tár; 4. Nope; 5. Women Talking	
2023	Killers of the Flower Moon	2. Past Lives; 3. Barbie; 4. Oppenheimer; 5. Spider-Man: Across the Spider-Verse	
2024	I Saw the TV Glow	2. Challengers; 3. Conclave; 4. Dune: Part Two; 5. Better Man	
2025	Sinners	2. One Battle After Another; 3. Kpop Demon Hunters; 4. Frankenstein; 5. Marty Supreme	

=== Performance, Filmmaker and Composer of the Year ===
Year	Performance	Ref.	Filmmaker	Ref.	Composer	Ref.
2014	Jenny Slate		Dan Gilroy		Mica Levi	
2015	Michael Shannon		George Miller		Disasterpeace	
2016	Alex R. Hibbert, Ashton Sanders, Trevante Rhodes		Kenneth Lonergan		Cliff Martinez	
2017	Vicky Krieps		Denis Villeneuve		Hans Zimmer	
2018	Toni Collette		Spike Lee		John Carpenter	
2019	Elisabeth Moss		Quentin Tarantino		Daniel Lopatin	
2020	Steven Yeun		Steve McQueen		Trent Reznor and Atticus Ross	
2021	Dev Patel		Janicza Bravo		Aaron Dessner and Bryce Dessner	
2022	Amber Midthunder		Daniels		Hildur Guðnadóttir	
2023	Margot Robbie and Cillian Murphy		Kemp Powers, Justin K. Thompson, and Joaquim Dos Santos		Ludwig Göransson	
2024	Timothée Chalamet		Jane Schoenbrun		Trent Reznor and Atticus Ross	
2025	N/A		Guillermo del Toro		Idles, Son Lux, Young Fathers, and Jeremiah Fraites	

=== Top 25 TV Shows ===
Year	TV show	Top 5 TV Shows	Ref.
2016	Stranger Things	2. Broad City; 3. Atlanta; 4. Halt and Catch Fire; 5. The Night Of	
2017	Twin Peaks	2. Halt and Catch Fire; 3. Nathan for You; 4. Alias Grace; 5. Crazy Ex-Girlfriend	
2018	The Americans	2. Atlanta; 3. Killing Eve; 4. Pose; 5. Barry	
2019	Succession	2. Fleabag; 3. Stranger Things; 4. Russian Doll; 5. Chernobyl	
2020	The Queen's Gambit	2. Better Call Saul; 3. The Boys; 4. What We Do in the Shadows; 5. The Last Dance	
2021	WandaVision	2. Succession; 3. Girls5Eva; 4. It's a Sin; 5. Hacks	
2022	Better Call Saul	2. The Rehearsal; 3. Severance; 4. Andor; 5. Abbott Elementary	
2023	Succession	2. The Bear; 3. Poker Face; 4. Reservation Dogs; 5. The Curse	
2024	English Teacher	2. Shōgun; 3. Fallout; 4. Hacks; 5. X-Men '97	
2025	The Rehearsal	2. Pluribus; 3. Adolescence; 4. Andor; 5. The Studio	

=== TV Performance and Showrunner(s) of the Year ===
Year	TV Performance	Ref.	Showrunner(s)	Ref.
2017	Rachel Bloom		Mark Frost and David Lynch	
2018	Billy Porter		Joel Fields and Joe Weisberg	
2019	Maya Hawke		Jesse Armstrong	
2020	Anya Taylor-Joy		Eric Kripke	
2021	Kathryn Hahn		N/A	
2022	Rhea Seehorn		N/A	
2023	Carla Gugino		N/A	
2024	Anna Sawai		N/A	
2025	N/A		N/A	

=== Comedian of the Year ===
Year	Comedian	Ref.
2013	Marc Maron	
2014	Cameron Esposito	
2015	Aziz Ansari	
2016	Bill Maher	
2017	Nathan Fielder	
2018	John Mulaney	
2019	Jenny Slate	
2020	Eric André	
2021	Bo Burnham	
2022	Joel Kim Booster	
2023	Nate Bargatze	
2024	Nikki Glaser	
2025	Marc Maron	

== Top 100 Ever ==
Category	Artist	Album/Song	Top 10	Ref.
Album	Prince & The Revolution	Purple Rain	2. Fleetwood Mac – Rumours; 3. The Beatles – Abbey Road; 4. The Clash – London Calling; 5. Joni Mitchell – Blue; 6. The Beach Boys – Pet Sounds; 7. Kendrick Lamar – To Pimp a Butterfly; 8. Radiohead – OK Computer; 9. Marvin Gaye – What's Going On; 10. Nirvana – Nevermind	
Song	The Beach Boys	"God Only Knows"	2. Talking Heads – "Once In a Lifetime"; 3. Bob Dylan – "Like a Rolling Stone"; 4. Michael Jackson – "Man in the Mirror"; 5. The Beatles – "A Day in the Life"; 6. The Velvet Underground – "Sister Ray"; 7. The Rolling Stones – "Sympathy for the Devil"; 8. Aretha Franklin – "Respect"; 9. The Notorious B.I.G. – "Juicy"; 10. Radiohead – "Idioteque"	
Singers	Michael Jackson		2. Billie Holiday; 3. Freddie Mercury; 4. Aretha Franklin; 5. James Brown; 6. Whitney Houston; 7. Roy Orbison; 8. Amy Winehouse; 9. Robert Plant; 10. Björk	
Soundtracks	Saturday Night Fever		2. The Graduate; 3. The Bodyguard; 4. Super Fly; 5. Dazed and Confused; 6. American Graffiti; 7. Above the Rim; 8. The Harder They Come; 9. Trainspotting; 10. 2001: A Space Odyssey	

== Cover Stories ==
Issue	Artist	Ref.
1	Red Hot Chili Peppers	
2	Jack White	
3	Ozzy Osbourne	
4	SZA	
5	Metallica	
6	TOMORROW X TOGETHER	
7	Jason Isbell	
8	Blur	
9	Corey Taylor	
10	Dolly Parton	
11	Masters of the Air	
12	Faye Webster	
13	Noah Kahan	
14	Amyl and the Sniffers	
15	Jack White	
16	Jack Antonoff	
17	Timothée Chalamet	
18	Trent Reznor and Atticus Ross	
19	Newport Folk Festival and Newport Jazz Festival	
20	Fontaines D.C.	
21	Saba and NO I.D.	
22	How Musical Guests Disappeared from Late Night TV	
23	Ghost	
24	Queens of the Stone Age	
