= October Language =

Studio album by Belong
- Released: 8 February 2006
- Recorded: 2004
- Genres: Shoegaze, ambient, noise
- Length: 44:56
- Label: Carpark
- Producers: Turk Dietrich, Michael Jones

Belong chronology
October Language (2006)	Colorloss Record (2008)

Alternative cover
- 2018 Spectrum Spools re-release cover art

Professional ratings
Review scores
Source	Rating
Allmusic	4/5 stars
Stylus Magazine	A−
Dusted	Favorable
Pitchfork Media	8.0/10
Prefix	6.0/10

October Language is an album by the New Orleans–based duo Belong, released on 8 February 2006 by Carpark Records. It has since been re-released on vinyl by the labels Geographic North in 2009, and Spectrum Spools (an Editions Mego imprint) in 2018 and 2022.

== Production ==
The album was written, recorded, and produced in 2004 in Dietrich's home studio in New Orleans. Guitars provided by Joshua Eustis were recorded in his own studio. Multiple different guitars such as the Parker Fly Deluxe and the Gibson Blueshawk, and a wide array of synths, such as the Sequential Prophet-5, the Roland Juno-106, and the Nord Micro Modular, were used in the album's production. These guitars and synths were then run through many different effect modules like the Sherman Filterbanks, the Roland RE-201, and the Frostwave Resonator, and then into the DAW Pro Tools where further VST effects were applied. Native Instruments' Reaktor and Kontakt were also used in the production of the album.

Dietrich emphasized the role that headphones, specifically the Grado SR-325s, played in the album's production: "...in the studio, headphones are always used. In addition to studio monitors, we use headphones through the recording, the editing, the programming, all the way through to the final mix."

== Track listing ==
All tracks are written by Turk Dietrich and Michael Jones.

No.	Title	Length
1.	"I Never Lose. Never Really"	4:43
2.	"Red Velvet or Nothing"	5:40
3.	"October Language"	5:30
4.	"I'm Too Sleepy... Shall We Swim?"	5:14
5.	"Remove the Inside"	5:59
6.	"Who Told You This Room Exists?"	5:05
7.	"All Equal Now"	5:31
8.	"The Door Opens the Other Way"	7:12

== Personnel ==
- Turk Dietrich – production and mastering
- Michael Jones – production
- Joshua Eustis – mastering, guitar on track 3, assistance on tracks 2 and 4
