= Colorloss Record =

EP by Belong
- Released: 1 February 2008
- Recorded: 2006, 2007
- Genre: Shoegazing, ambient
- Length: 18:22
- Label: Carpark
- Producer: Turk Dietrich, Michael Jones

Belong chronology
October Language (2006)	Colorloss Record (2008)

Professional ratings
Review scores
Source	Rating
Pitchfork Media	(8.4/10)

Colorloss Record is an EP by the band Belong. Each of the four tracks is a re-interpretation of a different 1960s psychedelic rock song.

== Track listing ==
1. "Late Night" - 3:32
2. "Beeside" - 5:11
3. "Girl From New York" - 3:38
4. "My Clown" - 6:41

== Production and writing notes ==
- Produced by Turk Dietrich and Michael Jones
- Late Night written originally by Syd Barrett
- Beeside written originally by Dave McTavish (original version recorded by Tintern Abbey)
- Girl From New York written originally by Billy Nicholls
- My Clown written originally by Tom Newman (original version recorded by July)
