= Nothing Valley =

Studio album by Melkbelly
- Released: October 13, 2017
- Length: 32:38
- Label: Wax Nine/Carpark

Melkbelly chronology
Pennsylvania (2016)	Nothing Valley (2017)

Professional ratings
Aggregate scores
Source	Rating
AnyDecentMusic?	7.4/10
Metacritic	78/100
Review scores
Source	Rating
AllMusic	3.5/5 stars
Consequence of Sound	B
Drowned in Sound	8/10
Paste	9.3/10
Pitchfork	7.5/10

Nothing Valley is the debut studio album by American band Melkbelly. It was released on October 13, 2017 through Wax Nine Records, a subsidiary of Carpark Records.

== Accolades ==
Publication	Accolade	Rank	Ref.
MusicOMH	Top 50 Albums of 2017	28	
Paste	Top 50 Albums of 2017	36	

== Track listing ==
No.	Title	Length
1.	"Off the Lot"	2:13
2.	"Kid Kreative"	2:18
3.	"R.O.R.O.B."	5:01
4.	"Greedy Gull"	2:22
5.	"Petrified"	3:24
6.	"Middle Of"	2:57
7.	"Twin Looking Motherfucker"	2:17
8.	"RUNXRN"	3:14
9.	"Return to Pan Candy Mountain"	1:28
10.	"Cawthra"	3:42
11.	"Helloween"	3:42
