= The Way and Color =

Studio album by Teen
- Released: April 22, 2014
- Label: Carpark

Teen chronology
Carolina (2013)	The Way and Color (2014)	Love Yes (2016)

Professional ratings
Aggregate scores
Source	Rating
Metacritic	75/100
Review scores
Source	Rating
AllMusic	4/5 stars
Consequence of Sound	B
DIY	2/5 stars
NME	7/10
The Observer	3/5 stars
Pitchfork	6.6/10
PopMatters	7/10 stars
Spin	7/10
Q	4/5 stars
Tiny Mix Tapes	2.5/5 stars

The Way and Color is the second studio album by American band Teen. It was released in April 2014 under Carpark Records.

== Track listing ==
No.	Title	Length
1.	"Rose 4 U"	4:54
2.	"Not for Long"	4:53
3.	"Tied Up Tied Down"	3:28
4.	"Sticky"	4:33
5.	"Breathe Low & Deep"	6:49
6.	"Voices"	2:02
7.	"More Than I Ask For"	4:46
8.	"Toi Toi Toi"	5:28
9.	"Reconsider"	3:29
10.	"All the Same"	5:38
