= Pitchfork Music Festival 2018 =

Music festival

- Dates: July 20–22, 2018
- Locations: Union Park, Chicago, United States
- Website: pitchforkmusicfestival.com

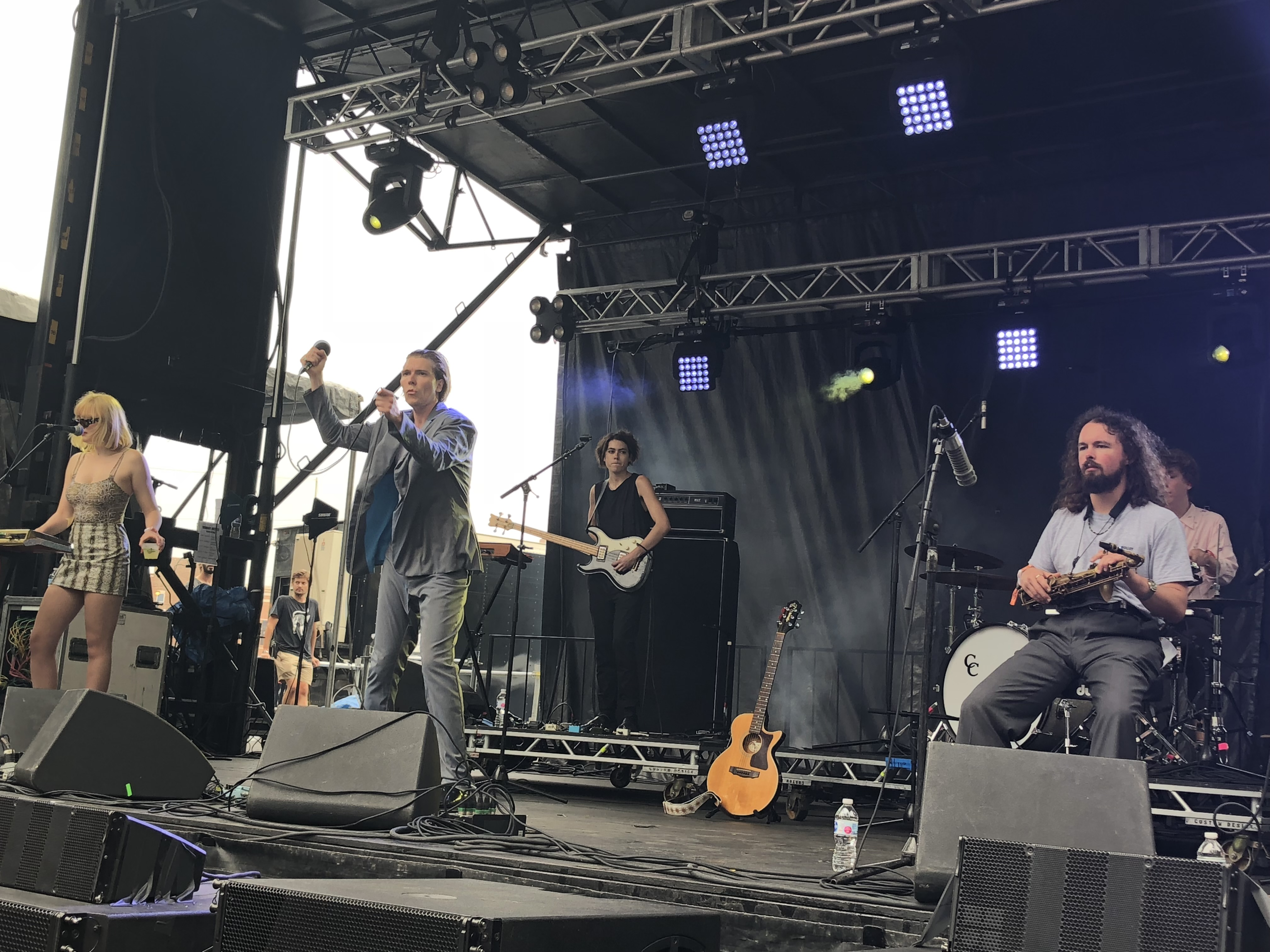
Alex Cameron performing at the Pitchfork Musical Festival 2018

The Pitchfork Music Festival 2018 was held on July 20 to 22, 2018 at the Union Park, Chicago, United States. The festival was headlined by Tame Impala, Fleet Foxes and Ms. Lauryn Hill. Hill performed her entire debut solo record, The Miseducation of Lauryn Hill as the twentieth anniversary of the album.

== Lineup ==
Headline performers are listed in boldface. Artists listed from latest to earliest set times.

Green
Friday, July 20	Saturday, July 21	Sunday, July 22
**Tame Impala**; Syd; Tierra Whack (Note: Earl Sweatshirt was set to perform but cancelled and replaced by Tierra Whack.); Lucy Dacus; The Curls	**Fleet Foxes**; Blood Orange; Moses Sumney; Zola Jesus; Paul Cherry	**Ms. Lauryn Hill**; DRAM; Smino; Kweku Collins; Nnamdi Ogbonnaya

Red
Friday, July 20	Saturday, July 21	Sunday, July 22
Courtney Barnett; Saba; Information Society; Melkbelly	The War on Drugs; Raphael Saadiq; Nilüfer Yanya berhana	Chaka Khan; Noname; Ravyn Lenae; Irreversible Entanglements

Blue
Friday, July 20	Saturday, July 21	Sunday, July 22
Mount Kimbie; Big Thief; Julien Baker; Open Mike Eagle; Julie Byrne	Kelela; This Is Not This Heat; Girlpool; Circuit Des Yeux; Kaitlyn Aurelia Smith	Japandroids (Sandy) Alex G Alex Cameron; Japanese Breakfast; Kelly Lee Owens
