= Love Yes =

Studio album by Teen
- Released: February 19, 2016
- Length: 48:44
- Label: Carpark

Teen chronology
The Way and Color (2014)	Love Yes (2016)	Good Fruit (2019)

Professional ratings
Aggregate scores
Source	Rating
AnyDecentMusic?	7.2/10
Metacritic	75/100
Review scores
Source	Rating
AllMusic	4/5 stars
Consequence of Sound	B-

Love Yes is the third studio album by American band Teen. It was released in February 2016 under Carpark Records.

== Track listing ==
No.	Title	Length
1.	"Tokyo"	3:33
2.	"All About Us"	3:47
3.	"Gone for Good"	3:57
4.	"Another Man's Woman"	4:50
5.	"Example"	4:13
6.	"Animal"	4:19
7.	"Free Time"	3:42
8.	"Superhuman"	4:07
9.	"Please"	4:11
10.	"Noise Shift"	4:06
11.	"Love Yes"	3:46
12.	"Push"	4:13
