= Good Fruit (album) =

Studio album by Teen
- Released: March 1, 2019
- Genre: Synth pop, R&B, jazz, psychedelic
- Length: 42:25
- Label: Carpark

Teen chronology
Love Yes (2016)	Good Fruit (2019)

Professional ratings
Aggregate scores
Source	Rating
Metacritic	71/100
Review scores
Source	Rating
The 405	7.5/10
AllMusic	4/5 stars
DIY	3/5 stars
Exclaim!	6/10
The Guardian	3/5 stars
The Line of Best Fit	8.5/10

Good Fruit is the fourth and final studio album by American band Teen. It was released in March 2019 under Carpark Records.

== Track listing ==
No.	Title	Length
1.	"Popular Taste"	4:03
2.	"Ripe"	3:53
3.	"Only Water"	3:52
4.	"Radar"	4:39
5.	"Connection"	6:58
6.	"Luv 2 Luv"	3:48
7.	"Shadow"	3:28
8.	"Runner"	3:45
9.	"Putney"	3:08
10.	"Pretend"	4:51
