= Emily Reo =

American Musician

- Emily Reo modeling a shirt designed by Noah Britton

Background information
- Instruments: Synth, vocals, keyboard

Emily Elizabeth Reo is an American lo-fi musician from Brooklyn.

== History ==
Reo released her first album in 2009, Minha Gatinha, a collection of songs recorded in her home. Reo released a cassette in 2010 titled Witch Mtn. In 2013, Reo released two songs, including "Peach", on the multi-artist release Clubhouse. In 2013, Reo released her first album with the record label Elestial Sound, titled Olive Juice. The following year, Reo released a remix album of songs from Olive Juice. Reo released an EP in 2016 titled Spell. In 2019, Reo released her third album, Only You Can See It, through Carpark Records, with the lead single "Strawberry."

== Discography ==
Studio albums

- Minha Gatinha (2009, self-released)
- Olive Juice (2013, Elestial Sound)
- Only You Can See It (2019, Carpark)

EPs

- Spell (2016, Orchid Tapes)

Cassettes

- Witch Mtn (2010, Breakfast of Champs)
