= Lesser Known =

Studio album by Adventure
- Released: March 22, 2011
- Genre: Synthpop
- Label: Carpark

Singles from Lesser Known
- 1. "Feels Like Heaven" Released: January 11, 2011; 2. "Rio" Released: February 17, 2011

Lesser Known is the second studio album of Adventure, a project by Baltimore musician Benny Boeldt. Released by Carpark Records in March 2011, Lesser-Known is an anthemic synthpop with non-computer-controlled synthesizers and live instruments; this is a departure from Adventure's previous self-titled album that consisted NES video game-style synthpop. Reviews from music journalists were mixed in general, some critics dismissing it as a record only imitating old music.

== Production and composition ==
In making Lesser Known, Benny Boeldt departed from the instrumental NES video game style of synthpop that was on Adventure's 2008 self-titled debut studio album, and went for commemorative-sounding synthpop using live instruments and maximalist M83-esque non-computer-controlled synthesizers. He described the change as a "shift in consciousness", allowing for more flexible musical creation than working within the style of the project's previous record. He taught himself how to sing while making the album, and went he got to recording the live instruments, he "had developed a nice vocal range", as he said in an interview. The first half of Lesser Known consists of Pet Shop Boys and Yazz-influenced chillwave, while the latter half consists of acid house and rave music.

== Release and promotion ==
Two singles were released from Lesser Known, "Feels Like Heaven" on January 11, 2011, and "Rio" on February 17, 2011.

Boeldt worked with Elena Johnston in creating what was described as the "pretty ominous" cover art for Lesser-Known, whom Johnston chose the pictures and helped him put the chosen images together on the artwork.

== Reception ==
Professional ratings
Aggregate scores
| Source | Rating |
|---|---|
| Metacritic | 61/100 |
Review scores
| Source | Rating |
| The 405 | 6.5/10 |
| AllMusic | 3.5/5 stars |
| NME | 5/10 |
| Pitchfork Media | 7.2/10 |
| Popmatters | 5/10 stars |
| Tiny Mix Tapes | 2.5/5 marks |

Reviews from music journalists upon release were generally mixed. Some reviewers disliked Lesser Known for having the same main problem as Adventure's debut album, that it only focused on recreating old music that was already easy to access both online and retro 1980s music stations without trying to cross over any boundaries or taking any chances. A critic from Under the Radar was one of these reviewers, describing Lesser Known as more "utterly predictable" than "nostalgic". Reviewers from Tiny Mix Tapes and NME were disappointed, writing that there were few tracks on the album that showed hints that it could've been much more than just a retro recreation record.

In more favorable reviews, Pitchfork Media honored Lesser-Known as a "riskily successful work of growth from Boeldt"; the source praised his attempt of singing with "often great success" on the record, writing, " Lesser-Known, then, is about self-exploration in unexplored territory, and how to lose yourself in that void. Boeldt's escaped, and it sounds like he's all the better for it." While finding it not as good as Adventure's previous LP, a The 405 critic wrote that "this can be seen as a transitional release or an experiment to test the waters of this project and for that, I cannot fully say that this fails, because it doesn't." The Line of Best Fit journalist Andrew Hwang wrote that "Boeldt builds castles of Tetris bricks, where each beat hits and clicks right into place. And each time the melody sinks, you feel yourself shrink a little bit from being so awestruck in the face." However, he also criticized the overly-long lengths of some of the tracks, especially the more dancey cuts that are a part of the second half of the record's tracklisting.
