= Teen (band) =

American alternative rock band

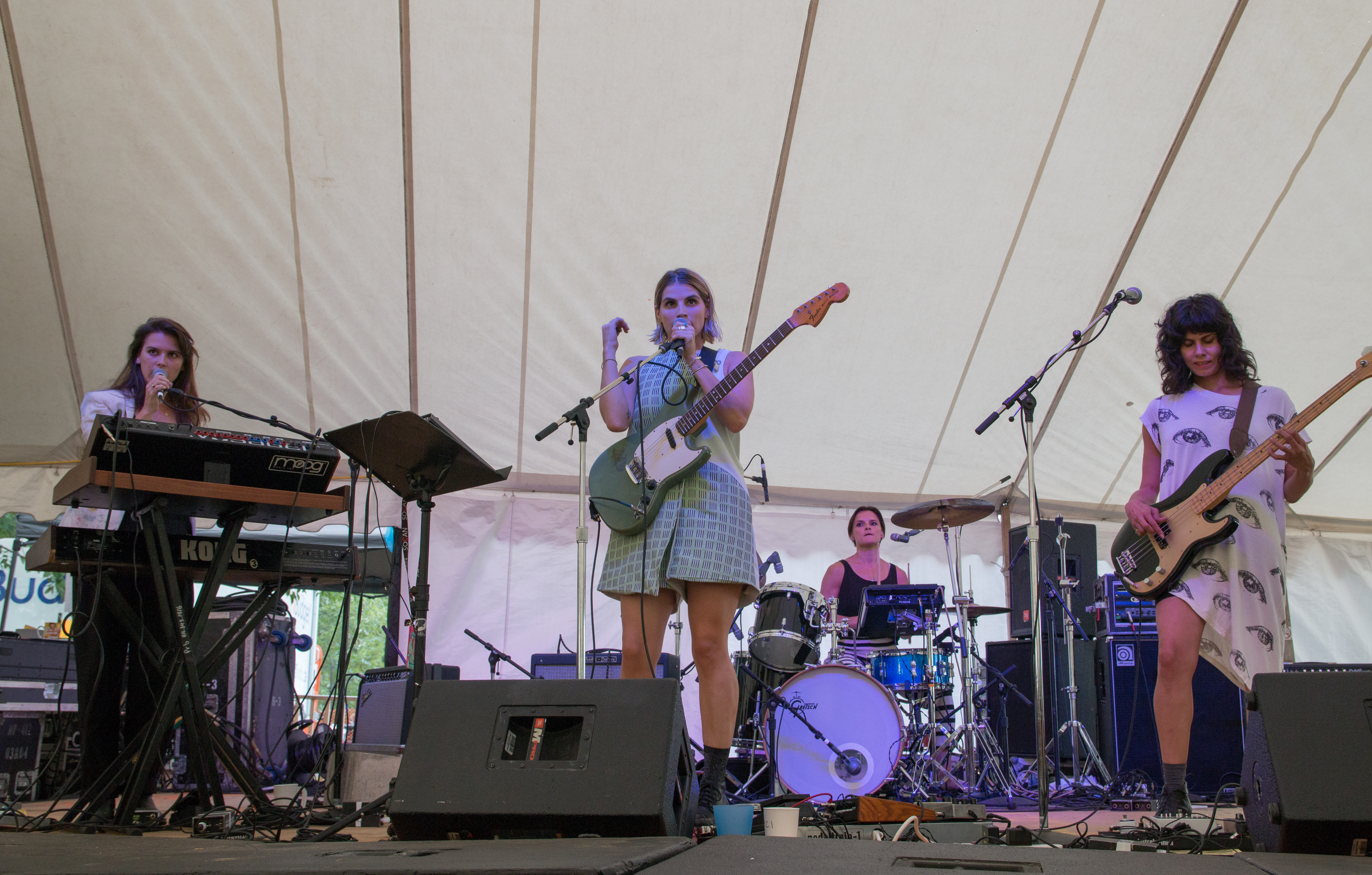
- Teen performing at the 2015 Hillside Festival

Background information
- Origin: Brooklyn, New York, U.S.
- Genres: Alternative rock
- Years active: 2010–2019
- Label: Carpark
- Past members: Kristina Lieberson; Katherine Lieberson; Lizzie Lieberson; Maia Ibar; Jane Herships; Boshra AlSaadi
- Website: teentheband.net

Teen (stylized as TEEN) was an American alternative rock band from Brooklyn, New York, formed in 2010.

The group consisted of Kristina "Teeny" Lieberson, former keyboardist for the Brooklyn band Here We Go Magic, her two sisters Katherine and Lizzie, and Boshra AlSaadi. The Lieberson sisters, daughters of composer Peter Lieberson, hail originally from Halifax, Nova Scotia.

== Career ==
In May 2013, Teen released their EP, Carolina, on Carpark Records.

In 2015, Teen toured with Will Butler of Arcade Fire. The following year, the band toured with of Montreal.

Teen disbanded after two final shows in Chicago and New York in October 2019.

== Band members ==
- Katherine Lieberson
- Kristina Lieberson
- Lizzie Lieberson
- Maia Ibar
- Jane Herships
- Boshra AlSaadi

== Discography ==
=== Albums ===
- 2012: In Limbo (Carpark Records)
- 2014: The Way and Color (Carpark Records)
- 2016: Love Yes (Carpark Records)
- 2019: Good Fruit (Carpark Records)

=== EPs and singles ===
- 2011: Little Doods
- 2013: Carolina (Carpark Records)
