= Mini-humbucker =

Pickup for electric guitars

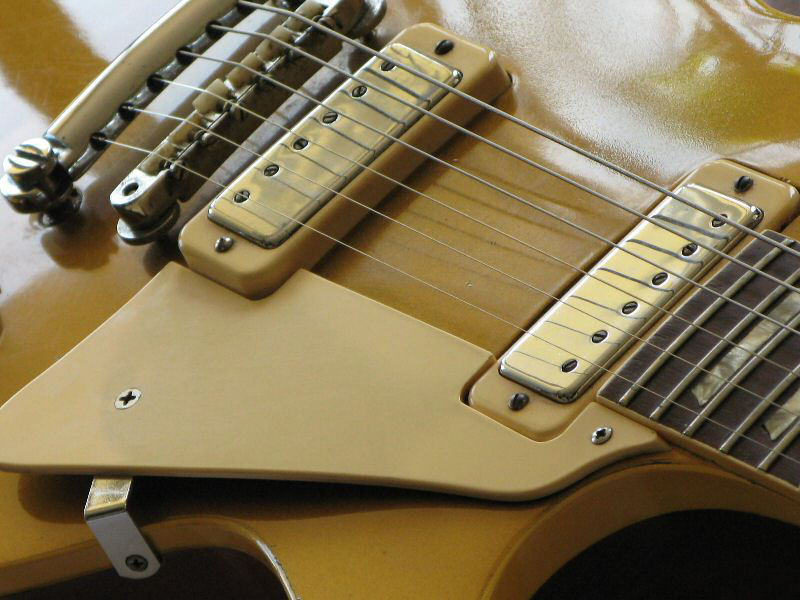
1972 Gibson Les Paul Deluxe

The mini-humbucker is a humbucking guitar pickup (used in electric guitars). It was originally created by the Epiphone company. The mini-humbucker resembles a Gibson P.A.F. humbucker, but is narrower in size and senses a shorter length of string vibration. This produces clearer, brighter tones that are quite unlike typical Gibson sounds. It fits in between single-coils and full-sized humbuckers in the tonal spectrum. It is frequently used in jazz guitars in a 'floating' arrangement, where it's mounted at the end of the fingerboard, or on the pickguard not into the body of the instrument.

The mini-humbucker technology was developed by Gibson when they purchased Epiphone in the late 1950s. After this acquisition, Gibson began using mini-humbuckers in various Epiphone models that were originally routed for Epiphone's New York style single coil pickup. They continued to use them on many Epiphone electric guitars (now manufactured under license for Gibson) and several of Gibson's archtop jazz guitars. A slightly different variation of the mini-humbuckers was used on Gibson Firebird guitars, thus giving them a very distinctive tone.

The Firebird pickup uses a pair of long 'rail' magnets whereas the Les Paul Deluxe mini-humbucker uses a single bar magnet below one ferrous rail and six threaded ferrous pole pieces. The Deluxe mini-humbucker has adjustment screws for the pole pieces; the Firebird mini-humbucker does not.

In the 1970s, mini-humbuckers replaced Gibson's original P-90 single-coil pickups on several of Gibson's budget guitar models, as well as the Les Paul Deluxe: the size and shape meant that it could fit very comfortably into the space occupied by the P-90, so no extra routing was required in the solid body guitars. Only select re-issue Gibson models are still made with mini-humbuckers, as they are less popular than standard humbuckers. In 2011, Gibson released a '70s Tribute line of guitars, offering inexpensive mini-humbucker variants of the Les Paul Studio, Firebird, and SG Special; these use the Firebird style of mini-humbucker pickup. Mini-humbuckers were also used in some models of the Nighthawk.

A mini-humbucker pickup design is also used for the pickups in Rickenbacker 650 guitars and 4004 basses.

Many third-party pickup manufacturers make mini-humbuckers.

== Notable users ==
- Johnny Winter used an Epiphone Wilshire equipped with mini-humbuckers early in his career. He later moved to the very different Gibson Firebird which also features mini-humbucking pickups
- Pete Townshend of The Who used a number of Gibson Les Paul Deluxe guitars in the 1970s that featured the mini-humbucker.
- Scott Gorham (Thin Lizzy) and Barry Bailey (Atlanta Rhythm Section) are users of the mini-humbucker.
- Caleb Followill from Kings of Leon uses a Gibson ES 325 with mini-humbucker, which he only uses when playing live.
- Jeff Carlisi of 38 Special used a 1969 Gibson Les Paul with mini-humbuckers as his primary studio guitar.
- Neil Young is also a user of the Firebird mini-humbucker fitted in his “Old Black” guitar.
- Clarence Gatemouth Brown switched to the Gibson Firebird shortly after it was introduced in 1963 and used its mini-humbuckers and his finger-picking style to create a signature tone for his swing blues.
- As part of Motown's original, 3-guitar, Funk Brothers rhythm section, Eddie "Chank" Willis used a Gibson Firebird with mini-humbuckers to complement the tones of Robert White's Gibson L-5 and ES 335 and Joe Messina's modified Fender Telecaster.
- Paul Gilbert uses the PG-13 mini-humbucker pickups designed for him by DiMarzio, in his signature model Ibanez Fireman guitars.
