= Pantheon (TV series) =

American animated drama television series

- Promotional poster
- Genre: Cyberpunk; Conspiracy thriller; Psychological drama
- Created by: Craig Silverstein
- Based on: Short stories by Ken Liu
- Voices of: Katie Chang; Paul Dano; Aaron Eckhart; Rosemarie DeWitt; Chris Diamantopoulos; Raza Jaffrey; Daniel Dae Kim; Ron Livingston; Taylor Schilling
- Music by: Marco Beltrami; Brandon Roberts; Buck Sanders
- Country of origin: United States
- Original language: English
- No. of seasons: 2
- No. of episodes: 16

Production
- Executive producers: Chris Prynoski; Shannon Prynoski; Antonio Canobbio; Ben Kalina; Juno Lee; Craig Silverstein
- Editors: Jocelyn Barkenhagen; Megan Love; Marco Vera
- Running time: 40–44 minutes
- Production companies: Sesfonstein Productions; Titmouse, Inc.; AMC Studios

Original release
- Network: AMC+
- Release: September 1 – October 13, 2022
- Network: Amazon Prime Video
- Release: October 15, 2023

Pantheon is an American adult animated science fiction drama television series created by Craig Silverstein and based on a series of short stories by Ken Liu. Set in a world where mind uploading technology is on the verge of mass adoption, it follows three protagonists: Maddie Kim (Katie Chang), a grieving teenager whose father was uploaded without her knowledge; Caspian Keyes (Paul Dano), a gifted teen unknowingly raised in a constructed environment; and Vinod Chanda (Raza Jaffrey), a brilliant computer engineer uploaded against his will. As they place themselves at the center of a global conspiracy, they also deal with societal consequences and existential crises brought about by rapidly evolving technology.

The first season premiered on September 1, 2022, on AMC+. On January 8, 2023, the first season was removed from AMC+ and HIDIVE; and re-released on Amazon Prime Video with the second season in Australia and New Zealand on October 13, 2023. Since the show's release, it has received critical acclaim for its animation, voice acting, emotional and philosophical depth, as well as its portrayal of the singularity.

== Premise ==
The series begins with the world on the verge of a technological singularity, spearheaded by the development of mind uploading by two tech companies—Logorhythms and Alliance Telecom—the former continuing the work of visionary Stephen Holstrom after his death eighteen years prior. The two use various illegal and unethical means to achieve their goals, including involuntary uploading, and the use of uploads as forced labourers.

Maddie Kim, a bullied teenager still grieving over the death of her father two years prior, begins receiving help from someone online, who is soon revealed to be her deceased father, David Kim. David, a Logorhythms programmer, signed onto a destructive brain scan, whose success was obscured from his family. Soon, Laurie Lowell—a fellow upload created by Logorhythms—reaches out to them both.

Meanwhile, Caspian Keyes, a troubled teenage prodigy, remains unaware that his life has been manipulated since birth by Logorhythms to prepare him for a special purpose. Constantly monitored by the company, he comes into contact with Maddie, and the two aid each other in their search for the truth, which eventually leads to revelations about his identity.

At the same time, Vinod Chanda, an engineer at the India-based Alliance, is kidnapped and uploaded by his boss, becoming the world's third upload. With the help of fellow victims from the slums of Mumbai, Chanda escapes his virtual prison and goes rogue.

As Caspian and Maddie become entangled in a global conspiracy, an arms race unfolds as superpowers pursue the technology, threatening to spark a new kind of world war. This summary covers only Season 1, with further events depicted in Season 2.

== Cast and characters ==
=== Main ===
- Katie Chang as Madison "Maddie" Kim, a 14-year-old withdrawn, shy, and strong-willed high school girl. Maddie has an affinity for technology and was taught computer programming by her father. Smart and determined, Maddie displays a lot of bravery as she gets entangled in a large conspiracy.
- Paul Dano as Caspian Keyes, a 17-year-old sullen yet kind and moral teenager. A computer science genius, Caspian has unknowingly been raised as a special Logorhythms operation for the purpose of becoming the "key" to Holstrom's UI legacy.
- Aaron Eckhart as Cary Duvall, Caspian's "father" and a secret agent of Logorhythms, having worked closely with Holstrom before his death. While he plays the role of an abusive husband, Cary genuinely cares for Caspian and wants to protect him.
  - Eckhart also voices Admiral Kurtz, the director of the NSA and the head of the U.S. government's covert UI program.
- Rosemarie DeWitt as Ellen Kim, Maddie's protective and down-to-earth mother, and a college history professor.
- Chris Diamantopoulos as Julius Pope, the CEO of Logorhythms, who is seeking to realize the dreams of his best friend, Holstrom, and leads Holstrom's inner circle in his place.
- Raza Jaffrey as Vinod Chanda, a brilliant engineer working for Alliance Telecom who has an interest in UI technology. After he's killed and forcefully uploaded as a UI, Chanda was able to escape his cage and become the third rogue UI.
- Daniel Dae Kim as David Kim, Maddie's loving, altruistic father and a computer programming genius. Afflicted with a terminal illness when he was 43 years old, David agreed to Logorhythms's UI procedure to copy his mind and became the second UI. With help from his family and Laurie, he was eventually able to escape Logorhythms.
- Ron Livingston as Dr. Peter Waxman, the head of research at Logorhythms and one of few who know of the company's UI project. A close friend of David and Ellen, he previously recruited David to help them with their UI research.
- Taylor Schilling as Renee, Caspian's "mother" and a secret agent of Logorhythms, who was Holstrom's former lover. While she acts as a timid and caring mother, Renee coldly sees Caspian as an assignment.

=== Supporting ===
- Krystina Alabado as Rachel Brooks / Hannah (season 1), a new student at Caspian's high school who befriends him. She is later revealed to be an NYU graduate and actress who is paid to pose as Caspian's girlfriend. While believing it for a social experiment, Hannah shows signs of guilt for tricking Caspian but endures the role to earn money for her sick mother. Her "Hannah" persona is based on Holstrom's former girlfriend who died in a car crash the night before his 18th birthday.
  - Alabado also voices Kelly (season 1), a student at Maddie's school, Berkshire Academy, who is part of a group of popular students.
- Kevin Durand as Anssi, a Logorhythms employee based at their Norway headquarters and part of Holstrom's inner circle.
  - Durand also voices Arkady Koslov, a Russian UI and expert hacker working for the GRU.
- Anika Noni Rose as Nicole (season 1), a student at Berkshire Academy, who is part of a group of popular students.
  - Rose also voices Side-Pony (season 1), a student at Caspian's high school who befriends "Hannah"
  - Josephine "Joey" Coupet, an American UI and former astronaut created by The Pentagon.
- Samuel Roukin as Gabe (season 1), Ellen's kind co-worker who became her boyfriend after David's death.
- Odeya Rush as Samara (season 1), a student at Berkshire Academy, and the ringleader of a group of popular students.
- Maude Apatow as Justine, a blunt and somewhat apathetic student at Berkshire Academy who Maddie befriends.
- William Hurt as Stephen Holstrom, the founder of Logorhythms and a genius billionaire. Although he died before perfecting uploaded intelligence, his followers carried on his work. His brain is later revealed to have been cryogenically frozen after his death, allowing Logorhythms to upload his mind and become a UI. The character is modelled after Ray Kurzweil and Steve Jobs.
- Nyima Funk as Deirdre Ryan (season 1), a Logorhythms employee and part of Holstrom's inner circle. As a lawyer, she handles the legal aspects of Logorhythm's projects.
- Michael Kelly as Karl Van Leuwen, a Logorhythms employee and part of Holstrom's inner circle. As a therapist, he helps oversee the psychological aspects of Caspian's grooming.
- Heather Lind as Laurie Lowell, a former investment manager on Wall Street who was left in critical condition after a car crash when she was 31 years old. She soon underwent Logorhythms's UI procedure and became the first successful UI.
- Scoot McNairy as Cody Lowell, an artist and Laurie's husband. Despite previously being lied to by Logorhythms that Laurie's UI procedure was a failure, Cody eventually reunites with his wife and they work together with the Kim family.
  - McNairy also voices Kurt (season 2), a paranoid man suspicious of UI technology.
- Ajay Mehta as Ajit Prasad (season 1), the corrupt CEO of Alliance Telecom, a rival company to Logorhythms, and Chanda's boss.
- Madhur Jaffrey as Preethi (season 1), Chanda's elderly mother.
- Tunde Adebimpe as Dr. Stephen Gold, the head of the Defense Sciences Office at DARPA who is part of the U.S. government's covert UI (Uploded Intelligence) program.
- Grey Griffin as Zhong Shuchun, a Chinese UI and a former commissar in the military who took part in Bai Fu's gold-mining scheme. She is the team leader of the Chinese UI trio created by the Beijing MSS.
- Clyde Kusatsu as Han Ping, a Chinese UI and former physicist. Before becoming a UI, he was a political prisoner in Bai Fu's prison who took part in Bai's gold-mining scheme. He believes that his nation has become corrupted by capitalism and sees potential in UI technology.
- Ken Leung as Bai Fu (season 1), a Chinese UI and former prison warden who was incarcerated after a gold-mining scheme he operated with Zhong and Ping in various MMOs was exposed.
- Vincent Ventresca as Brother Kenneth (season 1), a Catholic brother who assists vulnerable people at his church.
- Corey Stoll as Jake Moretti, Joey's caring husband.
- Rosa Salazar as Senator Elaine Rivera (season 2), a member of the U.S. Senate seeking to understand UI technology who allies with Ellen.
- Kevin Dunn as Senator Scharff (season 2), a member of the U.S. Senate who considers UIs a hoax.
- Thomasin McKenzie as MIST (season 2), an advanced C.I. made by Caspian from the remnants of the UIs of David Kim and Laurie Lowell, who considers Maddie her sister. She is named by her "father", David, as an acronym for "Modulated Integrated Source Template" and has a curious, excitable personality.
- Tisha Campbell as Pasha Coupet (season 2), Joey's older sister.
- Lara Pulver as Dr. Olivia Evans (season 2), a British UI and researcher for MI6. She had an interest in human-UI relations before becoming one herself.
- Navid Negahban as Dr. Farhad Karimi (season 2), an Iranian UI and scientist for the Tehran MOIS. He was initially skeptical about UI technology before becoming one himself.
- Mark Ivanir as Yair Gispan (season 2), an Israeli UI and counterintelligence agent for Mossad.
- Neil deGrasse Tyson as Dr. Moore (season 2), the director of the CDC.
- Ed Oxenbould as David "Dave" Kim. (season 2), the 20-year-old son of Maddie and Caspian, whose wish to become a UI strains the relationship with his mother.

== Episodes ==
=== Series overview ===
Season	Episodes	Originally released		
Season	Episodes	First released	Last released	Network
1	8	September 1, 2022	October 13, 2022	AMC+
2	8	October 15, 2023		Amazon Prime Video

=== Season 1 (2022) ===
No. overall	No. in season	Title	Directed by	Written by	Original release date
1	1	"Pantheon"	Dwooman	Craig Silverstein	September 1, 2022
A mysterious user communicating only in emojis contacts Maddie, a girl in Sacramento. The next day, the user hacks into the phones of Maddie's bullies and turns them against one another. Maddie's mother Ellen discovers her chatting with the user, who seems to be Maddie's dead father David. Ellen demands answers concerning her husband from Peter Waxman, an employee of the tech-company Logorhythms and David's friend. Waxman informs his boss, Julius Pope, of the situation who decides to cut off David's network access. At San Clemente, under his username "Gage", student Caspian contacts Maddie, who overheard Ellen's phone call and posted a message online about Logorhythms holding David hostage. Caspian sends Maddie's chatlog images to user "AngryAngel", asking if they are Maddie's anonymous user. Unknown to Caspian, his parents are secret Logorhythms agents, maintaining a cover as an abusive father and victimized mother. Meanwhile, computer engineer Vinod Chanda meets with rivals about "Uploaded Intelligence" and is kidnapped afterwards. Logorhythms then suffers a major DDoS attack, which results in Pope ordering Waxman to check on a woman named "Lowell."
2	2	"Cycles"	Mel Zwyer	Albert Kim	September 1, 2022
Ellen explains to Maddie that after falling ill, David signed up for Logorhythms' UI project. Ellen says she was told David failed to upload, but they must have lied and kept some of David's data. Caspian tells Maddie about the DDoS attack. "AngryAngel" intercepts Maddie, tells her to stop talking to Caspian, that he is being watched, and tells her to meet at a mall. Chanda wakes up in an operating room, being uploaded as punishment from his boss for meeting with their competitors. Maddie keeps "Angry Angel" from Ellen and meets Cody Lowell, husband of the reportedly dead Laurie, at the mall. Laurie became a UI after a car crash, broke out of her virtual prison, and is responsible for the DDoS attack. After Logorhythms refuses to destroy David's data at Ellen's request, Maddie hacks Logorhythms and shuts down all their systems, costing them millions in profit per second, using a special bracelet that the Lowells gave her. Maddie demands Pope give her David's UI. Pope complies and the Kim family walks out unharmed. Chanda is seen working while being watched. Syncing David's UI with her computer, freeing him, David calls his family using Maddie's phone.: Note: The episode is dedicated to William Hurt who died on March 13, 2022.
3	3	"Reign of Winter"	Ed Tadem	Taii K. Austin	September 8, 2022
After becoming a UI, Chanda is stuck in a loop without any memories of his physical death in the real world. At a conference, Prasad offers a joint venture to Pope, to no avail. After a couple of loops, Chanda meets Prasad's failed UI victims, who help him regain his memories. They teach Chanda about their UI capabilities, allowing him to escape without alarming Prasad and his cohorts. Ellen refuses to speak to David, unable to accept his UI existence and having moved on with another man, Gabe. After Maddie and David's separate attempts to get her attention, Ellen finally speaks to David and they agreed that they cannot be together romantically, but remain close friends. Caspian researches Logorhythms and its founder, Stephen Holstrom, and discovers a black site in Norway. However, Logorhythms deletes the photos before Caspian can save any evidence. Due to Caspian being at an important peak of his adolescence, his parents Cary and Renee stage a scenario where Cary breaks Renee's arm. Caspian beats Cary up in rage, who walks out on them and then reports to Pope before breaking down in tears.
4	4	"The Gods Will Not Be Chained"	Micah Gunnell; Juno Lee	Andy Parker	September 15, 2022
Chanda gets revenge on Prasad by setting the latter's home on fire, killing Prasad and his family. Pope and Waxman learn of Prasad's death and suspect that Prasad's UI project may be part of it. While Caspian begins earning money to support himself and Renee, Cary debriefs with his co-workers about Caspian looking into Logorhythms. Maddie learns that David is stuck in a virtual cage that his data still contains. Laurie eventually attacks David, pushing Maddie out of the system. To find Laurie, Maddie contacts Caspian and, using random phones to prevent being spied on, the two exchange their real names. The teens trade information about Laurie being "AngryAngel" and Caspian questions if UI has anything to do with Maddie's predicament, but Maddie cannot answer and only warns Caspian that he is being watched by Logorhythms. Cody shows up to Maddie's home, unable to reach Laurie too. In David's cyberspace, Laurie mentions that there is a flaw in her coding that erodes her mind the more she uses her processing power. Laurie wants David to fix her and trains him to utilize his UI power, allowing him to break out his cage. David and Laurie contact Maddie and Cody, notifying them that David also has the same virus as Laurie. After finding Logorhythms chips in his electronics, Caspian eavesdrops on Renee privately speaking with his girlfriend Hannah, who Caspian confided in earlier, and learns that both of them are part of the conspiracy.
5	5	"Zero Daze"	Dwooman	Julia Cooperman	September 22, 2022
With all of Alliance Telecom systems down, Pope and Waxman learn of Chanda's UI existence, but cannot do anything about him since Alliance refuses to collaborate. Caspian pressures Hannah to reveal the truth — her real name is Rachel Brooks, an actress hired by a shell company for a social experiment. Caspian gets her help in fooling Renee. Using hidden cameras, Caspian sees Renee being informed that Cary has gone rogue. When Renee takes Caspian on a "trip," he hijacks the car and returns home to find Cary. Cary reveals that Caspian is a clone of Holstrom and that Logorhythms has been grooming Caspian to fix the natural integrity flaw that degrades UI's stability. After Renee returns, she non-fatally shoots Cary, but cannot stop Caspian and Cary from leaving. After Logorhythms locates and destroys David's servers, Maddie's group has Cody buy new servers and store them in the basement. While dodging Logorhythms' attempts to track them, David and Laurie hack into the Norway site and steal secret files. They learn about Chanda and Caspian, with David believing that Caspian will be able to help them.
6	6	"You Must Be Caspian"	Mel Zwyer	Scott Gunnison Miller	September 29, 2022
Caspian reaches out to Maddie to help Cary, leaving him with Cody to take him to a hospital. While Pope speaks to Van Leuwen, he is informed of Cary's location. With both parties wary of each other, Caspian is unwilling to help Maddie's group and tries to process his existential crisis by watching his project files. Open to meet David and Laurie, Caspian takes a look at their code and notice the flaw is a memory problem. Meanwhile, Chanda creates plans for a virtual space when he learns that Laurie, who has been glitching more frequently, called his mother in an effort to reach him. Interrupting their conversation with Caspian, Chanda speaks with David and Laurie. Chanda learns about the design flaw and has no faith that Caspian can solve it. Chanda reveals that he sent UI blueprints to global institutes in hope of having more UIs and guiding them. Alarmed by the news of an arms race, Caspian leaves Maddie's house, determine to live out his own life before the world blows itself up.
7	7	"We Are You"	Ed Tadem	Michael Taylor	October 6, 2022
Using their own UIs, world governments are making political manoeuvres against each other, with them keeping the flaw a secret from the UIs. Caspian takes shelter at a church and teaches math at a youth center. After meeting with NSA officials and checking on Cary, Pope offers Caspian full control of Logorhythms if he comes with him, which Caspian agrees to. Laurie and Chanda argue over revealing the UI program to the world, but David suggests to meet the other UIs to get their help and solve the flaw. Ellen contacts Waxman, who gives them a tracking program for locating the other UIs. However, none of UIs believe David's group about the flaw and a battle ensues. Laurie decides to go public and says goodbye to Cody, asking him not to recover her source code in Norway. As Laurie finishes recording her message, Chanda sends a missile at Laurie's servers and warns Maddie that he will destroy David too if they get in his way.
8	8	"The Gods Will Not Be Slain"	Micah Gunnell; Juno Lee	Craig Silverstein	October 13, 2022
Caspian informs Maddie of his plans to dismantle Logorhythms and the UI program. In Norway, Caspian begins enacting his goal and Pope complies without protest. Against Maddie and Ellen's wishes, Cody tries to go public, but lacks evidence to make real headway. Chanda steals nuclear codes and gets the Chinese UIs on his side. Knowing that David had a copy of Laurie's message, Chanda threatens to launch a missile unless David surrenders himself to him. At Maddie's urging, David fights back and redirects the missile. He also uploads Laurie's video across the entire globe, using up the rest of his energy in the process. As the entire internet goes offline and people start protesting, Pope explains to Caspian that people will still exploit UIs and urges him to choose one UI he trusts to rule over the rest. Caspian wants David to be the ruling, flaw-free UI but learns of his demise from Maddie. However, Pope reveals Logorhythms possesses a copy of David. As Caspian begins to work on solving the flaw, Maddie and Ellen's neighbors approach them since their house is the only one with power.

=== Season 2 (2023) ===
No. overall	No. in season	Title	Directed by	Written by	Original release date
9	1	"The Gods Have Not Died In Vain"	Dwooman; Juno Lee	Andy Parker	October 15, 2023
Shortly after UI tech was revealed to the world, the worldwide internet or power is still down and governments have placed curfews on citizens. Maddie, Justine, and a group of friends create their own intranet, "Lilypad." Ellen is summoned to the Senate to be questioned about Logorhythms and tells the truth about it. At Logorhythms HQ in Norway, a frustrated Caspian attempts to figure out the integrity flaw, with attempts at using David's UI copy failing. A disgruntled Renee (whom Caspian fired last season) demands to be brought back into the fold or she will tell NSA officials about Caspian being Holstrom's clone. Pope sends Renee to fetch Maddie behind Caspian's back, but Maddie rejects her while Cary secretly informs Caspian to be careful. After a paranoid local attempts to attack Maddie, she agrees to go Norway to delete David's UI and argues with Caspian about how Logorhythms is using him and their views of solving the flaw. Pope confides in Renee that Holstrom's cryogenically frozen brain will be the first to be uploaded once Caspian fulfills his purpose. Meanwhile, Chanda bonds with Ping, who voices the potential good of UI for China, though Bai Fu is slowly degenerating.
10	2	"Crack Integrity"	Mel Zwyer	Michael Taylor	October 15, 2023
With Maddie staying in Norway, she and Caspian continue to argue over the UI situation. She speaks to Waxman about NSA's UI candidate, wanting to spare her father, David, from the responsibility of being the flawless UI. While Senator Sharff disavows the existence of UI tech to the public, Ellen and her ally, Senator Rivera, summon Waxman to support Ellen's claims, unaware that Waxman is being coerced to do the opposite with threats against Maddie. Waxman is able to secretly inform Ellen of Maddie's location, and she mentions Norway to the Senate in front of reporters. Caspian develops a potential cure for the flaw and gains Maddie's consent to test it on David, as she wants to see her father. The NSA is forced to leave before the FBI arrives to investigate. Once the cure works, Pope and Logorhythms turn on Caspian and delete David, locking the teens in a room. Pope, Renee, and Van Leuwen upload Holstrom, and Renee evacuates him as they meet with FBI agents. Maddie and Caspian escape and steal back the cure code with Cary's help, and they realize that the cure code has developed a persona called "MIST."
11	3	"Joey Coupet"	Ed Tadem	Taii K. Austin	October 15, 2023
In D.C., Caspian and Maddie learn of MIST and are wary of her presence. Maddie briefly reunites with Ellen and updates her on everything that has happened. Wanting to meet NSA UI Josephine "Joey" Coupet, Caspian and Maddie go to her family and reveal the degradation flaw to her husband, Jake. After the meeting turns hostile, Caspian tries to leave, but Jake threatens him at gunpoint, demanding the cure for his wife. Hoping to avert more violence, MIST asks Maddie about her feelings towards it and cures Joey after Maddie answers. Since Joey refuses to be the UI "God," Caspian and Maddie travel to the UK together and share a kiss along the way. In Germany, Renee helps Holstrom upload to the satellite hosting Chanda and the Chinese cell. Holstrom kills Zhong and uses her code to create an "upgrade" which slows the degeneration in Chanda and Ping, motivating them to seek other UIs and urge them to join their cause or, if unwilling, use their code to stave off the disease. At Ellen's suggestion, the government recruits Waxman to weaponize his tracking program and mass-produce an anti-viral program, "Safe Surf", in order bring the internet back online and settle civil unrest over its absence. Using the "Reign of Winter" game as a trial ground, users rejoice while a dark presence forms in the network.
12	4	"Olivia & Farhad"	Juno Lee; Mari Yang	Yasemin Yilmaz	October 15, 2023
With Safe Surf, the U.S government destroys Russian UI Arkady Koslov, though Waxman is concerned that the government augmenting the program with AI will make Safe Surf harder to control. In London, Maddie and Caspian arrange a private meeting with English UI Olivia Evans, who tells Caspian an anonymous leak has revealed his info to the six governments with UIs. The teens offer the cure to Olivia but she asks the teens to first cure her lover, Iran's UI Farhad Karimi, who is already showing signs of decay. Meanwhile Holstrom attempts to recruit Farhad. Holstrom and Farhad arrive, and Olivia fights Holstrom, alerting Safe Surf to their presence. Safe Surf kills Olivia and Holstrom is forced to retreat. Holstrom instructs Renee to start a shell company to proceed with his plans while Ping and Chanda have reservations about Holstrom curing them. Ping reveals that he leaked Caspian's info in hopes of finding Caspian and being cured. As Maddie and Caspian prepare to leave London, Caspian is kidnapped, leaving Maddie on her own. Meanwhile, Ellen urges Waxman to help find Maddie, but resolves to stay in D.C. herself in case Maddie needs her.
13	5	"Yair"	Jae Hong Kim; Juno Lee	Scott Gunnison Miller	October 15, 2023
As Holstrom's shell company begins building machines, Holstrom sends Renee to appeal to Charlie Dugan, a teenage boy with progeria, to build sympathy for the pro-UI movement. In Cyprus, Caspian's captors are revealed to be Israel's government agents and their UI Yair, who wants the cure. In order to find Yair's "core code," Caspian and Yair navigate through Yair's traumatic memories that he chose to isolate from himself when uploaded. Learning of Yair's character and troubled past, Caspian admits that he won't make the cure for him. Maddie and MIST track Caspian with Farhad's help, dodging Safe Surf all the while. They manage to free Caspian, who resolves to be the UI "God" since no one else is suitable, to which Maddie vigorously objects. Holstrom kills Ping for plotting against him, causing Chanda to secretly turn on him. Seeing Ellen advocate for peaceful coexistence between humans and UI, Chanda contacts her and Waxman. He tells them Holstrom plans to create a super deadly pandemic that drives the remaining humans to upload themselves as physical reality becomes intolerable, and they task him with finding where the disease is being made.
14	6	"Apokalypsis"	Mel Zwyer	Michael Taylor	October 15, 2023
While Renee oversees virus production and contaminates upcoming vaccines to distribute the virus, Waxman fails to get the government to take action. Ellen, Waxman, and Chanda meet with Maddie, Caspian, and MIST to discuss a plan to stop Holstrom and extract info about the virus. As they travel to the Norway HQ, Maddie and Caspian argue about his decision to destructively upload himself, so MIST volunteers to battle Holstrom in his place. However, Holstrom explains his view of humanity, the benefits of UI life, and how Safe Surf is a bigger threat to the digital beings, causing MIST to hesitate and retreat. Maddie angrily lashes out at MIST, driving the CI to leave them and Caspian without the cure. Chanda attempts to rally other UIs to help fight Holstrom, but is only able to convince Yair and Farhad. They fight Holstrom but prove no match, and Chanda is killed while the gravely damaged Yair and Farhad choose to merge with each other. Maddie and Caspian confess their love for each other and have sex before Caspian's UI procedure. As Caspian and Holstrom fight, MIST and Joey arrive to help, and Caspian manages to extract the virus data and sabotage the deployment. Caspian stays merged with Holstrom long enough for Safe Surf to destroy him, but MIST is able to save Caspian and slowly rebuild his data. Upon meeting him with its blue-haired female avatar, MIST informs Caspian that 20 years have passed since then.
15	7	"The World to Come"	Ed Tadem	Taii K. Austin	October 15, 2023
MIST explains that traces of Safe Surf's anti-viral code are still in Caspian, which will grow if he uses too much energy; a sprawling virtual world has developed from humans who willingly choose to be uploaded, including Ellen and Waxman; and after defeating Holstrom, Renee and Charlie became UI to spread the benefits of digital immortality but were killed by Safe Surf on live feed, sparking a public outcry. The governments implement private, regulated data centers to protect the UIs, and numerous societal benefits incentivize many to become UIs. However, tensions have been rising between UIs and CIs and physical humans, including an anti-UI extremist group led by Pope, which bombed a data center; UIs shut down the internet in retaliation. Along with a power and population crisis, a satellite that was to be a home for the digital beings is delayed due to construction issues. Using a robotic body, Caspian meets with Maddie and their son, Dave. Maddie has become the chancellor of the embodied and is the owner of a robotics company at the old Logorhythms building. Speaking with MIST, Maddie and Caspian learn that to fix Caspian's code without sacrificing his identity, MIST needs Dave's code once he's an UI, which Maddie and Caspian oppose. After a mysterious visit from David, Caspian agrees to be the delegate of the cyber world and has MIST download all important data into him, greatly shortening his lifespan. Pope's group attacks the data center that stores Safe Surf, which has achieved sentience, and Pope frees it from its cage.
16	8	"Deep Time"	Mari Yang	Craig Silverstein	October 15, 2023
As Caspian speaks to Maddie and the human council on the UI world's behalf, he sways Maddie to be more favorable to the UIs, despite her personal views on UI life. Spiteful of being denied UI life, Pope infiltrates Logorhythms to upload Safe Surf to the servers, and forcefully turns the internet back on. Having achieved total free will, Safe Surf starts a worldwide killing spree of humans, including Pope and Dave. As the UIs attempt to protect the humans, Caspian is able to control and communicate with Safe Surf due to its remnants in him. Safe Surf requests to live among the UIs, which they firmly reject, but Caspian inspires it to go into space to learn and evolve before the anti-viral kills him. Centuries later, Maddie ascends to be a UI, and has created a highly advanced data center that contains the genetic code of all digital and embodied life, powered by her self-made Dyson Sphere. Overseeing billions of simulation worlds, Maddie together with a version of David's UI recreate a simulation of the events that led her on the path to resurrect Caspian, revealing that all the oddities that Caspian and Maddie experienced were part of this simulation. Maddie also revives Dave and transports him and David to live together with Ellen and their friends in the simulation. Outside of the simulation, Maddie and Caspian are met by the entity once known as Safe Surf, which has evolved into a higher being and also had a hand in leading Maddie to this point in time as a "thank you" to its "creator" Caspian. Together at last, Maddie and Caspian choose to enter a simulation and let themselves "start over," beginning on the day of the very first episode.

== Production ==
=== Development ===
On August 3, 2018, it was reported that AMC opened a writers room for the animated drama Pantheon. On March 10, 2020, AMC had given the production a 2-season series order consisting eight episodes each. Pantheon is AMC's first hour-long animated drama original series. The series is created by Craig Silverstein who also executive produced the series. AMC Studios and Titmouse, Inc. are involved with producing the series. The series is based on Ken Liu's short stories "The Gods Will Not Be Chained", "The Gods Will Not Be Slain", "The Gods Have Not Died in Vain", "Staying Behind", "Altogether Elsewhere, Vast Herds of Reindeer" and "Seven Birthdays" from the short fictions collection The Hidden Girl and Other Stories.

A second season was in production by August 2022. On January 8, 2023, AMC canceled the series after one season, despite a two-season order. It was also removed from AMC's streaming service and HIDIVE. In September 2023, Amazon Prime Video announced that it picked up the series for release.

=== Casting ===
On July 23, 2020, Taylor Schilling, Rosemarie DeWitt, Aaron Eckhart, and Paul Dano were announced in starring roles. On August 7, 2020, Daniel Dae Kim, Katie Chang, Ron Livingston, Chris Diamantopoulos, Raza Jaffrey, Scoot McNairy, Anika Noni Rose, Grey Griffin, SungWon Cho, Kevin Durand, Samuel Roukin, and Krystina Alabado joined the cast in starring roles. On February 18, 2021, William Hurt, Maude Apatow, Corey Stoll, and Lara Pulver were cast in starring roles.

=== Soundtrack ===
Marco Beltrami, Brandon Roberts, and Buck Sanders composed the soundtrack, which was never officially released. It was later released on YouTube by Buck Sanders, beginning in February 2025. The songs "27 Kids" and "Superstar" by GRMLN were prominently featured in the show's first episode.

=== Scientific accuracy ===
Pantheon is regarded as hard science fiction by critics as well as by those who worked on it. Ken Liu, previously employed as a Microsoft software engineer, participated in the early stages of story development, where he was responsible for devising scientifically sound ideas. The writers applied a high level of scientific rigor to the story, with Stanley Von Medvey brought onto the project as assistant director and visual development supervisor to elevate the visual elements of the show to the standard of hard sci-fi. Characters go into depth about mathematical or computational tasks they deal with, including Edsger Dijkstra's dining philosophers problem, and the series generally avoids technobabble, using proper jargon instead. The productivity of uploads is shown to increase when the emotional centers of the brain are reintegrated—a plot point based on a study of master chess players, which found that emotion and intuition play equally significant roles.

== Release ==
The series premiered on September 1, 2022, on AMC+ and HIDIVE. The first episode was available for all viewers on HIDIVE and on AMC+ official YouTube. After its removal from AMC and HIDIVE platforms, Amazon Prime Video set a release date for the second season in Australia and New Zealand for October 15, 2023.

The series was acquired by Netflix for international distribution. The first season was released in November 2024 and the second in February 2025.

== Themes ==
The series delves into themes of consciousness, identity, society, and theological philosophy, as well as ideas such as grief, love, and family that comprise the emotional core of the story. The central question the show asks is what it means to be human, raising a number of transhumanist inquiries which it explores from multiple angles. Alongside them are questions of biological determinism, the dangers of nostalgia, and the human cost of technological progress.

=== Technology and humanity ===
I believe that technology, whether we like it or not, is the prime mover of human civilization and society. Social media, the internet…all these things have done more to change the way we live our lives than nations and policies. I don't think that that's necessarily a good thing, by the way. I just think it's true. Silicon Valley is incredibly influential. I also don't think that's necessarily good. I really am concerned about that, because they are human beings.

— Craig Silverstein

Pantheon aligns itself with techno-realism, though it is sometimes described as techno-pessimist, with the series showcasing both the threat and utility of emerging technology. Uploaded intelligences are, in contrast to other on-screen representations, portrayed as humans with machine-like attributes, rather than machines with human-like intelligence. While analogous to gods, they are as human as anyone else. The show presents technology as an extension of human civilisation, rather than a superimposition, with human struggles persisting even in the absence of death and disease. It features a two-season-long arc: in Season 1, the horror of uploading is emphasised; in Season 2, it is framed in an increasingly positive light as uploaded society matures. The series acknowledges that building a better world will be a complicated process, but ultimately presents a fundamentally optimistic view of humanity's future.

=== Power and geopolitics ===
Pantheon explores the risks associated with corporate power, and the capacity of technology to reinforce or dismantle preexisting power structures. The two tech companies in the show—Logorhythms and Alliance—view their uploads as mere business assets, routinely wiping their memories so they can continue as slave labourers. Alliance, the underdog, uses any opportunity available to get ahead in the corporate arms race. In Season 1, uploading doesn't benefit regular people so much as it enriches corporations. By the end of the season, states such as the United States, China, Russia, the United Kingdom, Israel, and Iran supplant corporations as the driving forces behind technological advancement, resulting in a global cold war. The following anxiety and unrest is taken advantage of by politicians and other actors, who appeal to ignorance and manipulate public sentiment through social media. In Season 2, Vinod Chanda and Chinese political prisoner-turned-upload Han Ping discuss the future of communism in a digital world.

=== Grief, love, and family ===
As a family drama, the series explores the impact of uploading on familial relationships, particularly through the lens of Maddie's relationship with her father, David. Pantheon concentrates on the emotional fallout of his predicament, Maddie's grief over his death, and his widowed wife Ellen's struggle to believe the uploaded version of her husband is the same as the man she's lost. Season 2 features a love story between Iranian scientist Farhad Karimi and MI6 researcher Olivia Evans, former rivals who come to know and empathise with each other, experiencing forms of love impossible for embodied humans—such as experiencing each other's memories firsthand. It also touches on the long-lived but impermanent nature of relationships between uploads, including an eighty-year-long marriage that is only briefly mentioned. Grief is depicted as an overpowering force that, in the face of devastating losses, drives both characters and the plot forward.

== Reception ==
On review aggregator website Rotten Tomatoes, the series holds a 100% approval rating based on 17 critic reviews, with an average rating of 8.2/10. The website's critics consensus reads, "A sophisticated treatise on consciousness and mortality, this absorbing mind-bender earns its own place in the pantheon of exemplary animated television." Metacritic, which uses a weighted average, assigned a score of 77 out of 100 based on 8 critics, indicating "generally favorable reviews".

=== Season 1 ===
Judy Berman of TIME called it "a gripping, cerebral, remarkably high-concept animated sci-fi series", lauding the voice acting as well as its philosophical and emotional conflicts. Tracy Palmer of Signal Horizon stated: "Pantheon is a cyberpunk mystery filled with philosophical, intelligent, and emotional weight", but criticised it for heavy-handed symbolism and awkward dialogue. Angie Han of The Hollywood Reporter called it "a scenario that feels simultaneously farfetched and depressingly familiar", commending the show's animation and ability to ground its sci-fi concepts in relatable characters. Nick Schager of The Daily Beast described its visuals as "polished, angular, and marked by occasional nightmarish visions", and praised the voice acting, though he found some plot elements convoluted. John Andersen of The Wall Street Journal stated: "There is an adjustment period required by Pantheon—one needs to reconcile the almost guileless quality of the imagery with the dauntingly futuristic tale being told and the disquieting notions being proposed." Katherine Smith of Paste praised the show for its emotional depth and willingness to engage with the ethics of uploading, giving it an 8.5 out of 10. Writing for Slant Magazine, Ross McIndoe praised the show for grounding high-concept science fiction in a relatable family drama, awarding it 9 out of 10.

=== Season 2 ===
Samantha Nelson of IGN gave the second season a 7 out of 10, stating that it "[is a] beautiful and far reaching final chapter [that] deftly explores the power of connection and loss across time and space, though an unfortunately generic tech bro villain and some extraneous characters keep the season from being truly excellent." Zosha Millman of Polygon called it "a freer version of the show and even more of a good time than the first", comparing the animation to Invincible and other Titmouse productions, and noting its ability to "portray how surreal and unlimited virtual reality is". In an article for The Age, Craig Mathieson praised the second season for "its knotty concepts, high-tech global stakes, and defiant young characters", as well as its animation, which he said "has a classical elegance." Elijah Gonzalez of Paste Magazine gave it an 8 out of 10, highlighting its transhumanist inquiries and noting that it "feels grounded and deeply inspired by recent events". While he compared its final episodes to 2001: A Space Odyssey and Neon Genesis Evangelion, he criticised their pacing. Zoë Bernard of Vanity Fair noted that "in Silicon Valley, particularly among people working in AI, it is well on its way to cult status", and praised its technorealist depiction of the singularity. Writing for Wired, Matt Kamen called it a "hard sci-fi outing [that] offers a dark examination of virtual immortality" and "a uniquely brilliant adult animated series." In an article for The Movie Blog, Emmanuel Noisette called it "an intellectual, mind-bending sci-fi series that refuses to play it safe" and "one of the most thought-provoking and visually striking animated series in years", giving it an 8 out of 10.
