= Gibson Little Lucille =

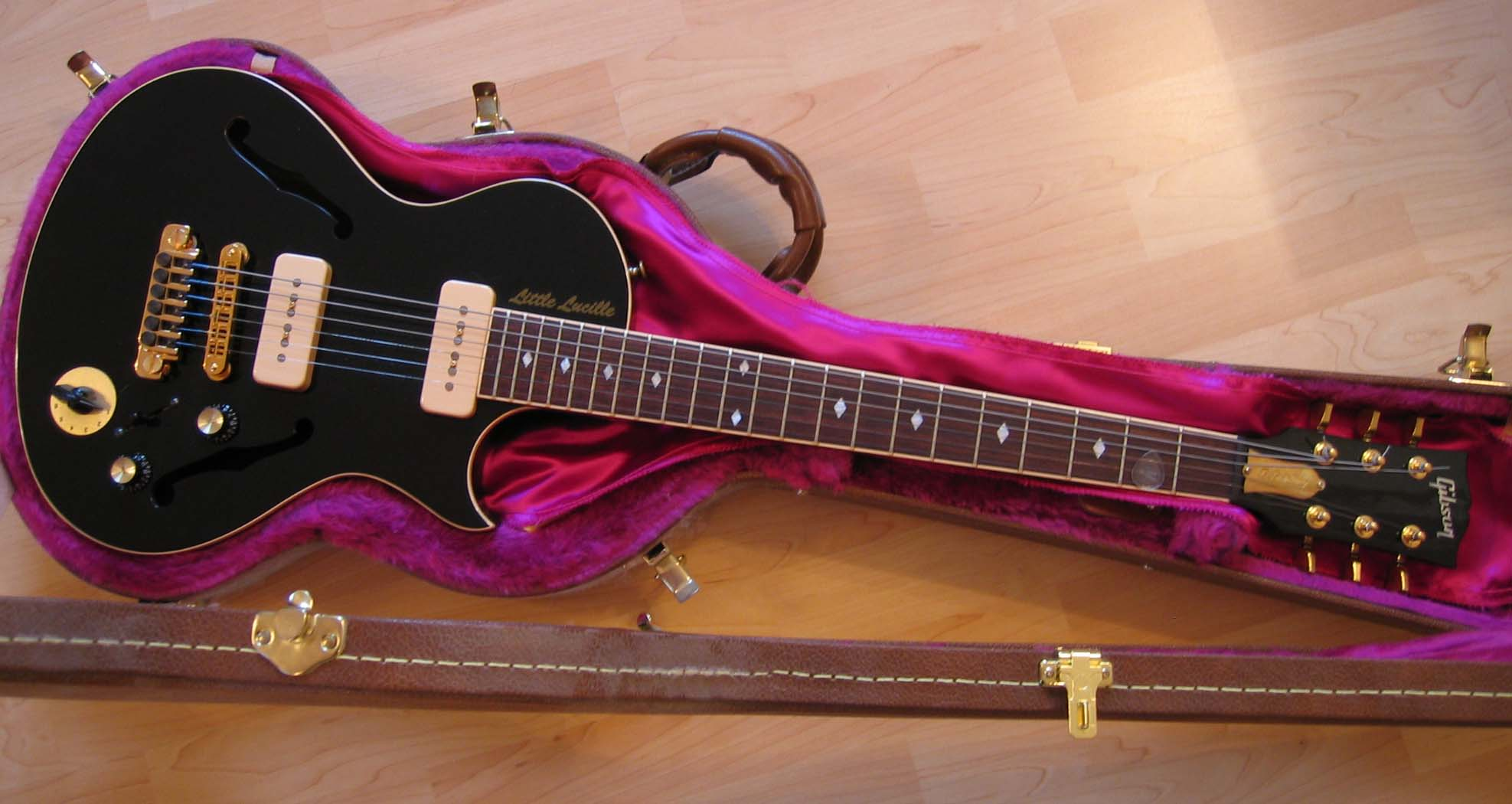
- Manufacturer: Gibson
- Period: 1996-2006

Construction
- Body type: Semi-solid – two sound cavities with f-holes
- Neck joint: Set

Woods
- Body: Maple cap over Poplar
- Neck: Mahogany
- Fretboard: Rosewood

Hardware
- Bridge: Gibson Tune-o-matic Bridge, TP6-tailpiece with fine tuners
- Pickup(s): Blues 90 – neck & bridge

Colors available
- Ebony (black)

The Little Lucille is a semi-hollow bodied electric guitar made by Gibson between 1996 and 2006 and was designed mainly for blues players. It superficially resembles the Les Paul in that the body outline is similar. The Little Lucille was discontinued by Gibson in 2006. The Little Lucille is a variant on the Blueshawk that features a stop tailpiece and tune-o-matic bridge. The Little Lucille was endorsed by B. B. King.

== Construction ==
The Little Lucille has a number of distinctive features that distinguish it from virtually all other Gibsons. The Little Lucille's body outline is the same as a slightly earlier range of guitars, the Nighthawks (1993–1999), but unlike the Nighthawks, the Little Lucille is a semi-hollow bodied guitar with twin f-holes and a flat (uncarved) top.

Other distinctive / innovative features include:

- 25.5 inch scale length (the same as many Fenders, Gibson's more typically have a 24.75 inch scale length)
- Blues 90 pickups (a modified version of the P-90 pickup)
- noise reduction circuitry which employs a dummy coil
- a Varitone circuit (similar to that used on the Gibson ES345) – the Varitone circuit is a mid-cut/band-stop filter with a choice of five center frequencies
- a light guitar – the body is made from poplar, capped with maple – the body is small and relatively thin and has two cavities
- simple control set – master volume, master tone, three-way pickup selector, six-way rotary Varitone control switch
