= Belong (band) =

American experimental music duo

- Origin: New Orleans, Louisiana, U.S.
- Genres: Experimental, avant-garde, minimal, electronic, ambient, drone, noise, shoegaze, ethereal wave, post-punk, Gothic
- Years active: 2002–present
- Labels: Carpark; Geographic North; Kranky; Spectrum Pools (Editions Mego/Mego); Table of the Elements

Belong is an American experimental music duo composed of Turk Dietrich and Michael Jones. The group formed in New Orleans in 2002. Their debut album, October Language, was recorded in 2004 and released in 2006. The duo's sound blends ambient styles, with a focus on guitar textures. Reviews made comparisons to current electronica artists like Fennesz and Tim Hecker, as well as the early 1990s shoegazing sound attributed to bands such as My Bloody Valentine and The Jesus and Mary Chain. Guitars and synthesizers are run through various effects to produce the band's sound.

In January 2008, their Tour EP, (recorded in 2005, sold as a CDr at live shows in February 2006) surfaced in 128 kbit/s quality, ripped by a fan. Belong directly offered it to fans in MP3 for free, at a higher quality 192 kbit/s. This was also done for their latest EP, Same Places, this time in 320 kbit/s.

In 2009, October Language was released on vinyl by Geographic North Records, a label based out of Atlanta, Georgia.

In 2011, the band released its second album, Common Era, through Kranky, introducing elements of post-punk and Krautrock, distinguishing it from the drone and ambient textures of October Language.

In 2024, after more than a decade in the making, Belong released their third full-length LP, Realistic IX.

== Discography ==
=== Albums ===
- October Language (2006)
- Common Era (2011)
- Realistic IX (2024)

=== EPs ===
- Tour (2006)
- Colorloss Record (2008)
- Same Places (2008)
