= Hundred Waters =

American band

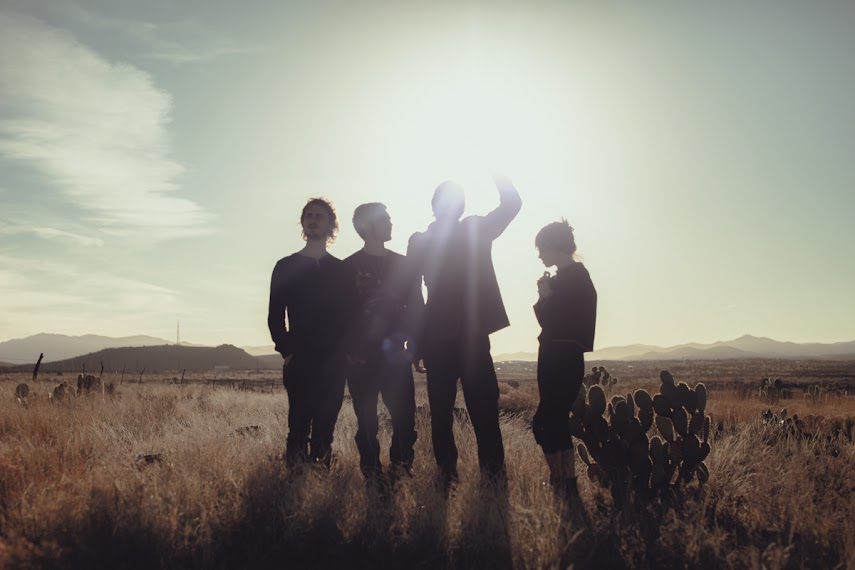

Background information
- Origin: Gainesville, Florida
- Genres: Indie rock, electronic, art rock, folk
- Years active: 2011–present
- Label: Owsla
- Members: Nicole Miglis; Trayer Tryon; Zach Tetreault
- Past members: Paul Giese; Samantha Moss
- Website: hundred-waters.com

Hundred Waters is an American band formed in Gainesville, Florida in October 2011, composed of Nicole Miglis (vocals, piano, production, flute), Trayer Tryon (production, electronics, bass) and Zach Tetreault (drums, percussion, trumpet). The group came to prominence in 2012 with the release of their first self-titled album and an unexpected partnership with Skrillex's predominantly electronic Owsla record label. Hundred Waters wrote and produced most of their second album, The Moon Rang Like a Bell, while on tour with alt-J, The xx, Julia Holter and others; it was released on May 27, 2014.

== Band members ==
- Nicole Miglis – vocals, piano, flute, songwriting, production
- Trayer Tryon – production, electronics, bass
- Zach Tetreault – drums, percussion, trumpet

== History ==
=== Formation and early years ===
Hundred Waters members Trayer Tryon, Paul Giese, and Zach Tetreault became friends and musical collaborators while attending middle school together in Orlando, Florida. Their personal and musical ties continued from high school to college at the University of Florida in Gainesville, Florida where they shared a home together. During this period, the trio performed under several different projects and organized local shows in their backyard. Tryon released two solo albums and original artwork on Porter Records between 2010 and 2011 featuring contributions from Zach and Paul.

Tetreault befriended Nicole Miglis after he attended her convocation performance at the University of Florida's School of Music. Miglis, raised in Melbourne, Florida, began her educational and musical pursuits from an early age. She has described her childhood self as quiet and introspective, often spending hours playing her family's piano. She started songwriting at a young age but did not receive vocal training. Leading up to the formation of Hundred Waters, Nicole earned a degree in piano performance at University of Florida while performing globally as a concert pianist. Miglis self-released a solo EP in March 2012 containing a collection of songs she wrote from 2008 to 2010.

In 2011, Miglis moved into the house Tetreault, Giese, and Tryon had been living and collaborating in since moving to Gainesville. Miglis began dating Tryon, and would later discover that the house was formerly a karate dojo where her parents had first met as aspiring martial artists. During this time, the four were backing fellow Gainesville musician and friend David Levesque's live sets during early tours for his project Levek. After returning home from a tour with Levek, Hundred Waters and their eponymous debut album began to take shape over the summer of 2011. Despite working day jobs and attending classes, the roommates convened at night to listen and discuss developing songs together.

=== Hundred Waters (Album) ===
Hundred Waters first album, Hundred Waters, was first released by independent label, Elestial Sound on February 29, 2012. Elestial also provided them with a vegetable-oil powered school bus used as transportation on their first US tour and SXSW performance during Spring of 2012.

The album's initial release on Elestial Sound was well received by critics, with Pitchfork giving it an 8.1/10 rating, praising it for its "unapologetic, real-time virtuosity, compositional refinement, and vision."

Following the album's release the band was invited to take part on Skrillex's Full Flex Express Canadian Train Tour, which featured Skrillex, Diplo, Grimes, and Pretty Lights. Upon returning, the band signed a record deal with Owsla in August 2012 releasing a remix EP for Thistle featuring remixes from Araabmuzik, Star Slinger and others. One month later on September 25, 2012, OWSLA rereleased Hundred Waters' self-titled album, this time reaching a larger and more diverse audience.

Following the OWSLA re-release, Hundred Waters debuted in the Top 50 on the CMJ 200 radio charts, resulting in a growing fanbase among college-aged listeners and inclusion in Spin Magazine’s 25 Must-See Acts at CMJ 2012. Stereogum included Hundred Waters in their 40 Best New Bands of 2012 and Top 10 Sets of CMJ 2012, stating, "Their arpeggios are classical, their sense of drama and space and volume is post-rock, their time signatures are prog, their delicate and interweaving vocal harmonies are choral. Live their beats were fat, with pockets deep enough to allure the hip-hop heads filtering in and out of whatever room I was watching them in."

Hundred Waters toured their first album extensively throughout 2012 to 2013, playing over 200 shows including direct support domestically and internationally for Alt-J and The xx. They also co-headlined a US tour with Julia Holter. The New York Times described Hundred Waters live performance as "a watercolor wash of possibilities, a suspension of time, an embrace of textural experiment and open-ended expectations."

=== The Moon Rang Like a Bell ===
Hundred Waters second album, The Moon Rang Like a Bell, was released May 27, 2014 on Owsla in the US and Canada, !K7 Records in Europe, and Traffic in Asia.

The Moon Rang Like a Bell was written and recorded over three years, with the band composing and producing over 60 songs in the process. Tryon said, "We made a lot of music over the last 3 years. There are about 60 songs, in a few separate groups. One of those groups is much more organic, pretty much acoustic. This one, The Moon Rang Like a Bell, covers the biggest range emotionally and is probably the most argumentative. It had the greatest attraction for us to finish, so we did."

The Moon Rang Like a Bell was primarily written in Hundred Waters van while touring their first record. It was inspired by being on the road for long periods of time and being in remote locales, downtown Los Angeles and their home of Gainesville. When the band finished an American and Canadian tour with The xx, Tetreault and Giese moved into The Nest, an OWSLA-owned warehouse in Los Angeles’ Chinatown where they continued to finish the record. Miglis and Tryon rented a cabin two hours North of Los Angeles where they lived, wrote and recorded. All members returned to their management company's Downtown Los Angeles’ headquarters to record vocals and mix the album, continuing to experiment with unconventional production techniques. Tryon said, "Paul went out with big speakers on Skid Row at like 3:30 a.m. We went up on the roof with microphones and set off the building alarm, and the cops came—that’s the alarm that you hear on Murmurs." Likewise Broken Blue was recorded via a Skype call between Miglis and Tryon. The poor wireless internet reception broke up to the audio of a piano, which the band kept on the album.

The first two singles Down From The Rafters and Cavity were both awarded Pitchfork's Best New Music designation and the latter premiered on NPR alongside a video directed by acclaimed experimental filmmaker, Michael Langan. NPR commentator Jacob Ganz called the album's first singles “dense" and "hypnotic".

Several days before the release of The Moon Rang Like a Bell, Hundred Waters and their management company, Family, produced FORM: Arcosanti, a music festival held at Arcosanti an experimental town and molten bronze bell casting community founded in 1970 by Italian architect Paolo Soleri in central Arizona. The band had previously stayed at the facility; Giese had studied the town while earning a master's degree in architecture at University of Florida. The festival was meant for the friends, family and residents of the Arcosanti community, but it became a three-day event celebrating the May 27th release of The Moon Rang Like a Bell. Performers included Majical Cloudz, How To Dress Well, ESKMO, Kodak To Graph, Julie Byrne, Suno Deko, Alvin Risk and others.

Reception to the album was positive. Pitchfork gave the album 8.3 out of 10 and a Best New Music pick, calling it a "refinement" to their debut. Rolling Stone gave the album a 3.5 out of 5. It peaked at No. 18 on CMJ's Top 200 chart, leading to in-studio performances including an on-air interview and performance at Seattle's KEXP. BitTorrent also released a BitTorrent Bundle for the album featuring a selection of the songs and bonus materials which has been downloaded 984,000 times.

The band performed The Moon Rang Like a Bell live, headlining a tour with Mas Ysa, GEMS, and Pure Bathing Culture from June to July 2014. It was also for the Pitchfork Music Festival, performing to a live and online live-streaming audience on July 18, 2014.

Following their US tour dates, Hundred Waters began a European headline tour. On July 14, 2014, Hundred Waters and Interpol announced that they would be touring the United States and Canada together during Fall 2014.

=== Communicating ===
The band announced its third full-length album, Communicating, on July 12, 2017. The album was released September 14, 2017 on Owsla.

== Discography ==
Title	Details	Track list
Thistle EP	Released: August 21, 2012; Label: Owsla; Formats: Digital download	Thistle; Thistle (Star Slinger Remix); Thistle (AraabMuzik Remix); Thistle (TOKiMONSTA Remix); Thistle (Lockah Remix); Thistle (Different Sleep & Troublemaker Remix)
Hundred Waters LP	Released: September 25, 2012; Label: Owsla; Formats: Digital download	Sonnet; Visitor; Me & Anodyne; Thistle; Caverns; . . . _ _ _ . . .; Boreal; Wonderboom; Theia; Are/Or; Gather; Hydrodictyon
Boreal Remix EP	Released: March 26, 2013; Label: Owsla; Formats: Digital download	Boreal; Boreal (Blood Diamonds Remix); Boreal (Brillz Remix); Boreal (Phantoms Remix); Boreal (Daedalus Remix); Boreal (Teebs Remix)
Cavity	Released: March 3, 2014; Label: Owsla; Formats: Digital download	Cavity
Xtalk	Released: April 16, 2014; Label: Owsla; Formats: Digital download	Xtalk
The Moon Rang Like A Bell LP	Released: May 27, 2014; Label: Owsla; Formats: Digital download	Show Me Love; Murmurs; Cavity; Out Alee; Innocent; Broken Blue; Chambers (Passing Train); Down From The Rafters; [Animal]; Seven White Horses; Xtalk; No Sound
Down From The Rafters Remixes EP	Released: November 6, 2014; Label: Owsla; Formats: Digital download	Down From The Rafters (Huxley Remix); Down From The Rafters (The Field Remix); Down From The Rafters (Tim Hecker Remix)
The Moon Rang Like A Bell Remixed	Released: February 27, 2015; Label: Owsla; Formats: Digital Download	Show Me Love (Nicole Miglis Acoustic); Murmurs (Brandt Frick Remix); Cavity (Shigeto Remix); Out Alee (Plaid Remix); Innocent (Illangelo's Confessional Remix); Broken Blue (Dirty Beaches Remix); Chambers (bvdub's Two Hearts Apart); Down From The Rafters (Huxley Remix); [Animal] (Siriusmo Remix); Seven White Horses (Trayer's Last Mix); Xtalk (Kodak To Graph Remix); No Sound (Paul & Zach's Waltz)
Forgive Me For Giving Up	Released: February 26, 2016; Label: Owsla; Formats: Digital download	Forgive Me For Giving Up
Show Me Love (Skrillex Remix)	Released: March 22, 2016; Label: Owsla; Formats: Digital download	Show Me Love (feat. Chance the Rapper, Moses Sumney & Robin Hannibal) (Skrillex Remix)
Particle	Released: May 8, 2017; Label: Owsla; Formats: Digital download	Particle
Currency EP	Released: May 12, 2017; Label: Owsla; Formats: Digital download	Jewel in my Hands; Particle; Takeover; Everywhere; Currency
Blanket Me	Released: July 12, 2017; Label: Owsla; Formats: Digital download	Blanket Me
Fingers	Released: August 14, 2017; Label: Owsla; Formats: Digital download	Fingers
Wave To Anchor	Released: September 8, 2017; Label: Owsla; Formats: Digital download	Wave To Anchor
Communicating LP	Released: September 14, 2017; Label: Owsla; Formats: Digital download	Particle; Wave To Anchor; Prison Guard; Parade; At Home & In My Head; Firelight; Re: Fingers; Communicating; Blanket Me; Better
Spotify Singles	Released: February 28, 2018; Label: Owsla; Formats: Digital download	Blanket Me (Live); I Don't Believe in the Sun (Live Cover)
Mushroom Cloud	Released: April 18, 2018; Label: Owsla; Formats: Digital download	Mushroom Cloud
Towers	Released: June 14, 2024; Formats: Digital download	Տալ; Towers; Mark My Words; What Is It Going to Take

=== Remixes ===
Track	Original Artist	Release	Label
"Haven"	Neil Davidge	October 22, 2012	Microsoft Studios
