= GRMLN =

Japanese-American musician

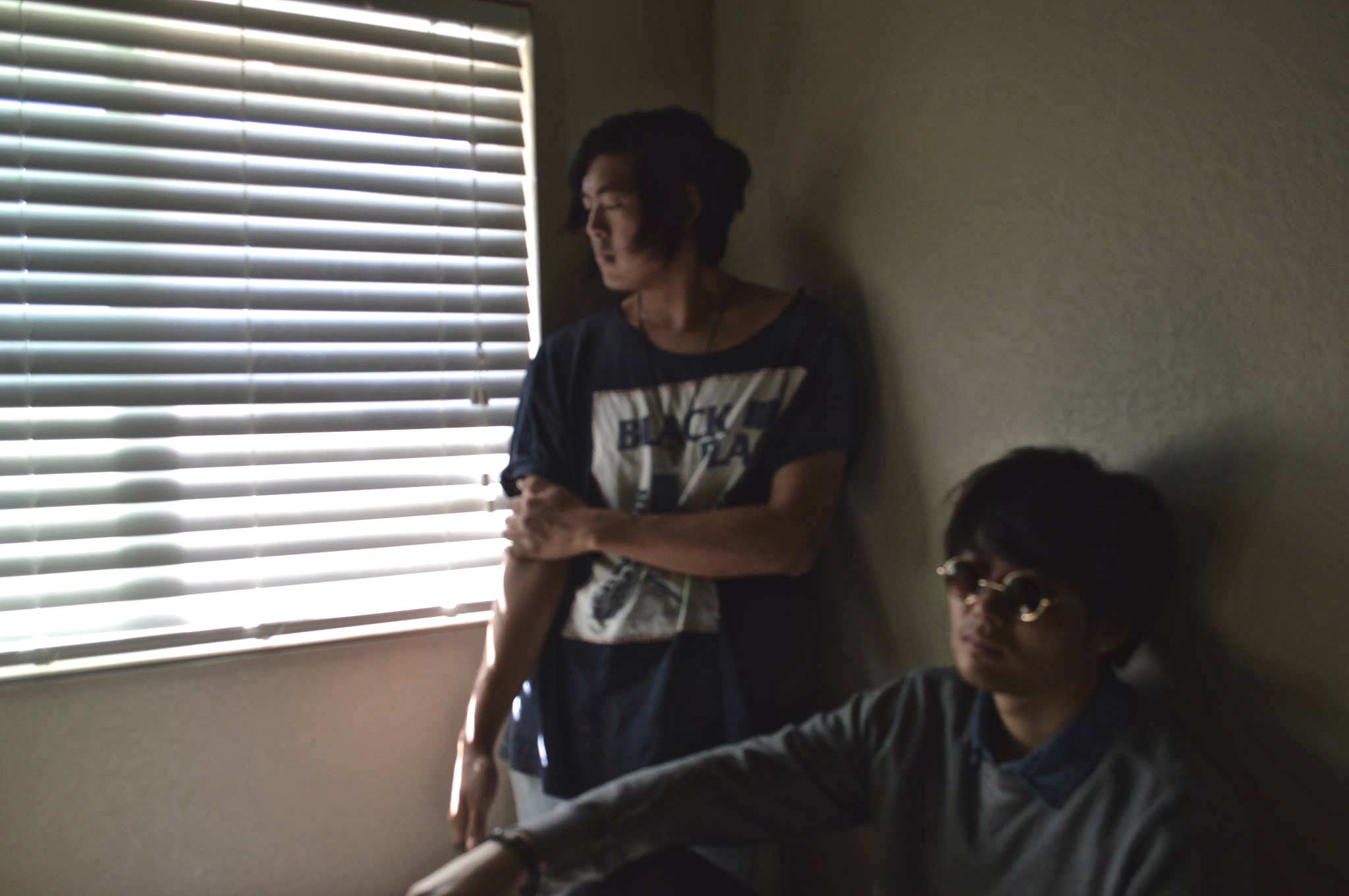

Background information
- Also known as: GRMLN
- Born: Yoodoo Park; Kyoto, Japan
- Origin: California, United States
- Genres: Punk, Lo-fi, Garage, Singer-Songwriter
- Occupations: Producer, Guitarist, Songwriter
- Years active: 2012–present
- Label: Carpark
- Members: Yoodoo Park

Yoodoo Park, known by his stage name GRMLN, is a Japanese-American musician.

== Early life and career ==
Park was born in Kyoto, Japan and raised in Southern California. Park started recording and producing music during his early years under the moniker GRMLN. Even though the project started off as an experiment for recording, Park's songs quickly picked up internet buzz, getting written up by many popular music blogs in the US and the UK, including DIY Magazine. (interview with Prefix Magazine) Park was signed to Carpark Records (Washington, D.C.) during his first year in college (at the age of 18) with the release of Park's first EP Explore. GRMLN's first album, Empire, was recorded at Different Fur Studios in San Francisco, California. Empire was released on June 4, 2013 via Carpark Records. GRMLN's second album, Soon Away, was released on September 16, 2014 also via Carpark Records.

GRMLN has toured and supported popular acts in the indie/rock scene including Geographer, Yuck, Born Ruffians, and Tijuana Panthers. After signing to Carpark Records, Park has released Explore (2012), Empire (2013) and Soon Away (2015) with the release of singles that were never released through vinyl ("Night Racer", "Void"). Park has since self-released Discovery, Out of Disorder, Afraid Of..., Explore II, Impressions From The Dark, Year of Isolation, Heavenly Bodies, Is It Really That Strange?, Non Classical, Goodbye, World, Morning Star, and Oni. Park has been cited as producer and mixer for all GRMLN albums released so far. Park's songs have been used in shows some including ABC's Revenge, Netflix's Shadowhunters, AMC+'s Pantheon, and Hulu's Difficult People. The most notable appearance of his work was included in the major gaming franchise 'Forza Horizon 2' which used the song "Teenage Rhythm" from GRMLN's album Empire (2013).

GRMLN is now based in America, Japan, and Australia.

== Discography ==
=== Studio albums ===
- Explore (EP) – October 2012 (Carpark Records)
- Empire (LP) – June 4, 2013 (Carpark Records)
- Soon Away (LP) – Sept 16, 2014 (Carpark Records)
- Discovery (LP) – April 7, 2017 (Self-Released)
- Out of Disorder (LP) – August 7, 2017 (Self-Released)
- Afraid Of... (LP) – March 18, 2018 (Self-Released)
- Discovery//Afraid Of... (Double LP) – May 11, 2018 (Self-Release)
- Explore II (LP) – May 24, 2018 (Self-Released)
- Demos//B-Sides (LP) – (Self-Released)
- Impressions From The Dark (LP) – August 28, 2018 (Self-Released)
- Year Of Isolation (LP) – October 29, 2018 (Self-Released)
- Heavenly Bodies (LP) – January 17, 2019 (Self-Released)
- Oni (LP) – February 10th, 2019 (Self-Released)
- Is It Really That Strange? (LP) – March 18, 2019 (Self-Released)
- Listening To Your Nightmares (EP) – June 22, 2019 (Self-Released)
- Non Classical (LP) – September 20, 2019 (Self-Released)
- Goodbye, World (LP) – March 1, 2020 (Self-Released)
- Morning Star (LP) – July 6, 2020 (Self-Released)
- Dark Music In The Sun (LP) – March 30, 2021 (Self-Released)
- Laughing Shadow (LP) – October 1, 2021 (Self-Released)
- American Boy (LP) – February 10, 2022 (Self-Released)
- Dark Moon (LP) – January 4, 2023 (Spirit Goth Records)
- Lost Days In Lake Biwa (LP) – March 15, 2023 (Self-Released)
- New World (LP) – June 21, 2024 (Self-Released)
- Another Being (LP) - January 30, 2025 (self-released)
- A Beautiful Place To End (LP) - December 10, 2025 (self-released)

== Appearance in media ==
- "Teenage Rhythm" appeared in video game Forza Horizon 2.
- "Dear Fear" appeared on ABC's 'Revenge'.
- "27 Kids" appeared on Netflix's 'Shadowhunters'. and AMC's Animated Series Pantheon
- "Superstar" also appeared on AMC's Animated TV Series Pantheon.
- "Coral" and "Void" appeared on Hulu's 'Casual'.
- "Evil Baby" and "Don't You Wanna" appeared on CW's 'Republic of Sarah".
