= Gibson Nighthawk =

Model of electric guitar

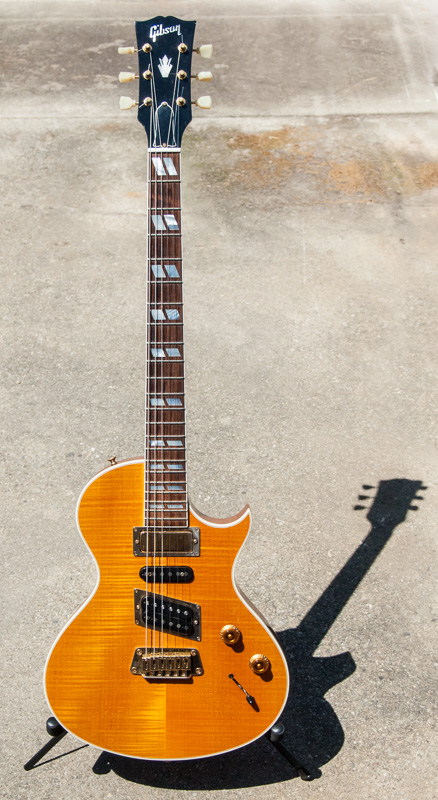
- 1993 Nighthawk ST3 in translucent amber.
- Manufacturer: Gibson
- Period: 1993–1998; 2009–c. 2020

Construction
- Body type: Solid
- Neck joint: Set neck

Woods
- Body: Mahogany with a maple top
- Neck: Mahogany
- Fretboard: Rosewood

Hardware
- Pickup(s): Humbucker + mini-humbucker Optional middle single-coil

The Gibson Nighthawk was a family of electric guitars manufactured by Gibson. Introduced in 1993, the Nighthawk represented a radical change from traditional Gibson designs. While its maple-capped mahogany body and set neck were reminiscent of the classic Gibson Les Paul, the Nighthawk incorporated a number of characteristics more commonly associated with Fender guitars. The Nighthawk was not a commercial success; production of all models was discontinued in 1998 after only five years.

In July 2009, Gibson revived the Nighthawk with the Nighthawk 2009 limited edition. Current production models include the Nighthawk Studio, the 20th Anniversary Nighthawk Standard, and the 2013 Nancy Wilson Nighthawk Standard. Some of these newer models are faithful to the design of the original Nighthawk, but others are only cosmetically similar.

== Models ==
=== Original models ===
- The Nighthawk Custom (CST or CST3) has a decorated flame maple top. The headstock, body, and neck are bound, and the neck has crown-shaped inlays + ebony fretboard. The color options were antique natural, fireburst, and translucent amber.
- The Nighthawk Standard (ST or ST3) has a more plain flame maple top, with binding only on the body and neck. The fingerboard has split-parallelogram inlays. The color options were fireburst, translucent amber, and vintage sunburst.
- The Nighthawk Special (SP or SP3) was a low-end model, with some cosmetic features omitted to reduce cost. The Special has the same components as the Standard and Custom, but is bound only on the body. The neck has plain dot inlays and the headstock does not have a holly crest adornment. The color choices were ebony, heritage cherry, and vintage sunburst. The Nighthawk Special was priced about $200 below the Nighthawk Standard.

All of these models were available with either two or three pickups. The two-pickup models (CST, ST, and SP) have an M-series mini-humbucker in the neck position and an M-series slanted humbucker at the bridge. The three-pickup models (CST3, ST3, and SP3) have the same pickups as the two-pickup models, plus a third NSX single-coil pickup in the middle position. The photo above shows an original three-pickup Nighthawk ST3.

Pickup selection map for original 1990s Gibson USA Nighthawks.

The five-position knife switch common to all Nighthawks provides five tone settings (or pickup combinations), but on the three-pickup models, the tone knob includes a push-pull feature that provides access to a second set of five, for a total of ten tones. It is often said that when the knob is pulled out, the humbuckers' coils are split, but this is somewhat misleading. All Nighthawks have a mixture of humbucking and split-coil tones whether or not they have the push-pull feature. On the two-pickup models, only positions two and five use both coils of the same pickup; the other three positions are split-coil. On the three-pickup models, one or both humbuckers are split in positions one, two, four, and five with the tone knob pulled up, and in position five with the tone knob pushed down. (See the graphic at right.)

The pickup selections on the reissue Nighthawks of later years (see below) are usually different from the original models of the 1990s.

=== Special editions ===
- The Landmark Series are Nighthawks with paint and finishes meant to represent United States national parks and monuments. Each Landmark guitar is marked "Landmark Series" on the back of the headstock and included a decal identifying the park or monument it commemorated. The Landmark Series uses two M-Series mini-humbuckers instead of the standard Nighthawk combination of one mini-humbucker and one slanted humbucker.
- In 1994 a numbered limited edition of 100 Nighthawks was released. This model is basically a Nighthawk ST3 with a chocolate-burst finish. On the trussrod cover are the words "Limited Edition" and the guitar's number/100.

=== Other related models ===
- The Hawk was a low-cost alternative to the Nighthawk. It has conventional Alnico humbuckers instead of the M-series pickups used in the Nighthawk, and it is cosmetically even more plain than the Nighthawk Special.
- The Blueshawk and Little Lucille, introduced in 1996, are blues-oriented guitars modeled on the Nighthawk. They have partly hollow bodies with F-holes and two single-coil Blues 90 pickups.

=== Modern revival models (no longer in production) ===
- The Nighthawk 2009 was a limited edition released in 2009. It features a maple-capped mahogany body in translucent amber finish and two pickups (a P-90 in the neck position and an Alnico humbucker in the bridge position), and a fixed bridge.
- The Nighthawk Standard 2010 was a limited edition with a quilted maple cap (in the Chicago blue, Memphis mojo and St. Louis sauce finishes) over a chambered poplar body. Some sellers claimed that only one hundred of each color were made, but Gibson has never confirmed this. The Nighthawk 2010 came with gold hardware, a granadillo fretboard, a fixed bridge, and three pickups (a splittable BurstBucker 1, a Gold Blade single-coil, and a splittable BurstBucker 2). The five-way selector switch plus the coil-splitting option provide a total of nine pickup combinations.
- The Nighthawk 2011 is nearly identical to the 2010 model, but it was offered only in the vintage sunburst finish and its MSRP was $300 higher. The production run was not limited.
- The Nighthawk Studio was introduced in 2011. It features a solid mahogany body (without a maple cap) and two humbucking pickups (a BurstBucker 1 and a BurstBucker 2). It was available in the goldtop, Pelham blue, and silverburst finishes.
- The Epiphone Nighthawk Custom Reissue was introduced in 2011. It was a low-cost model based on the original Nighthawk CST3, but with only a veneer (rather than a solid cap) of flame maple over a mahogany body. It was available in the honey burst, fireburst, trans amber, and trans black finishes. Like all modern Epiphones, it was manufactured in the Far East.

=== Later models ===
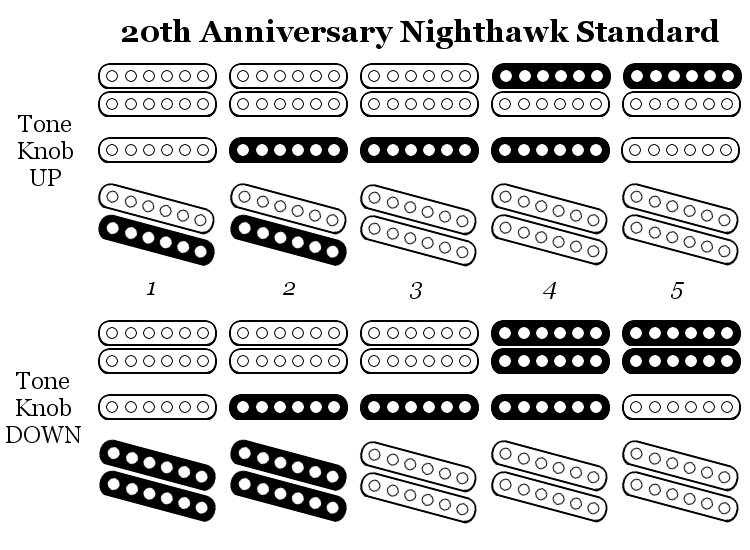
Pickup selection map for Gibson 20th Anniversary Nighthawk Standard.

- The 20th Anniversary Nighthawk Standard was introduced in 2013. Its construction and features are very similar to the original Nighthawk ST3, but its pickup selections are different (see graphic), and it was available only in the antique natural and fireburst finishes.
- The Nancy Wilson Nighthawk Standard was introduced in 2013. It is a two-pickup model with a mini-humbucker, similar to the original Nighthawk ST. It was available only in the fireburst finish. It was based on a prototype that Wilson had designed in collaboration with Gibson years earlier.

== Similarities to Fender guitars ==
With its set neck and maple-capped mahogany body, the Nighthawk is structurally and aesthetically a Gibson, but certain key aspects of its design take it into Fender territory. The slanted bridge humbucker has less gain than the regular Gibson humbucker and has a bright, sharp tone which in single-coil mode is similar to that of Fender's Telecasters and Stratocasters. The mini-humbucker neck pickup has a mellower and warmer tone than the bright bridge pickup, and in single-coil mode is also similar to the sound of the neck pickup in a Stratocaster. The middle pickup (available as an option) is a single-coil design similar to the middle pickup of the Stratocaster. The Nighthawk's scale length (the distance from the nut to the bridge) is Fender's standard 25½" rather than Gibson's usual 24¾". This important difference, which requires greater tension for a given gauge of strings, makes the guitar feel more like a Fender from a playing perspective and adds to the tonal similarities. The Nighthawk's body is closer in mass to a Fender guitar than a typical Gibson Les Paul, and the string-through-body bridge is similar to that of the Telecaster.

Some Nighthawk Customs use a Floyd Rose locking vibrato unit instead of the Gibson Vibrola or Bigsby vibrato tailpiece more commonly found on Gibson guitars.

== Notable Nighthawk players ==
- Robe Iniesta of the Spanish rock band Extremoduro
- Joe Louis Walker
- Nancy Wilson
- Michael Ward (Wallflowers)
- Shaun Verreault (Wide Mouth Mason)
- John Esparza (Pickup 6)
- Louise Wener (Sleeper)
- Eduardo Alquinta (Los Jaivas)
- Dave Davies, formerly of The Kinks, has been seen playing a Nighthawk on stage in recent years
- Roberto Bucci (La Bocca della Verità), italian progressive band
- Piras Antonio Giulio "Tully" (VamPiras), Italian Punk Metal
- Buick Audra has been seen playing a Nighthawk on stage. She has at least two of the guitars.
- Peter Frampton on "Frampton comes alive II" 1995 playing a Nighthawk ST with 2 Pus in translucent amber on stage.
- Troy Grady, from “Cracking the Code” series on YouTube
- Eivør Pálsdóttir, played throughout her album 'Live in Tórshavn', recorded in 2017, and regularly around this period.
- Barry Blair (Audio Adrenaline)
