= Geographer (band) =

American synth pop/indie rock band

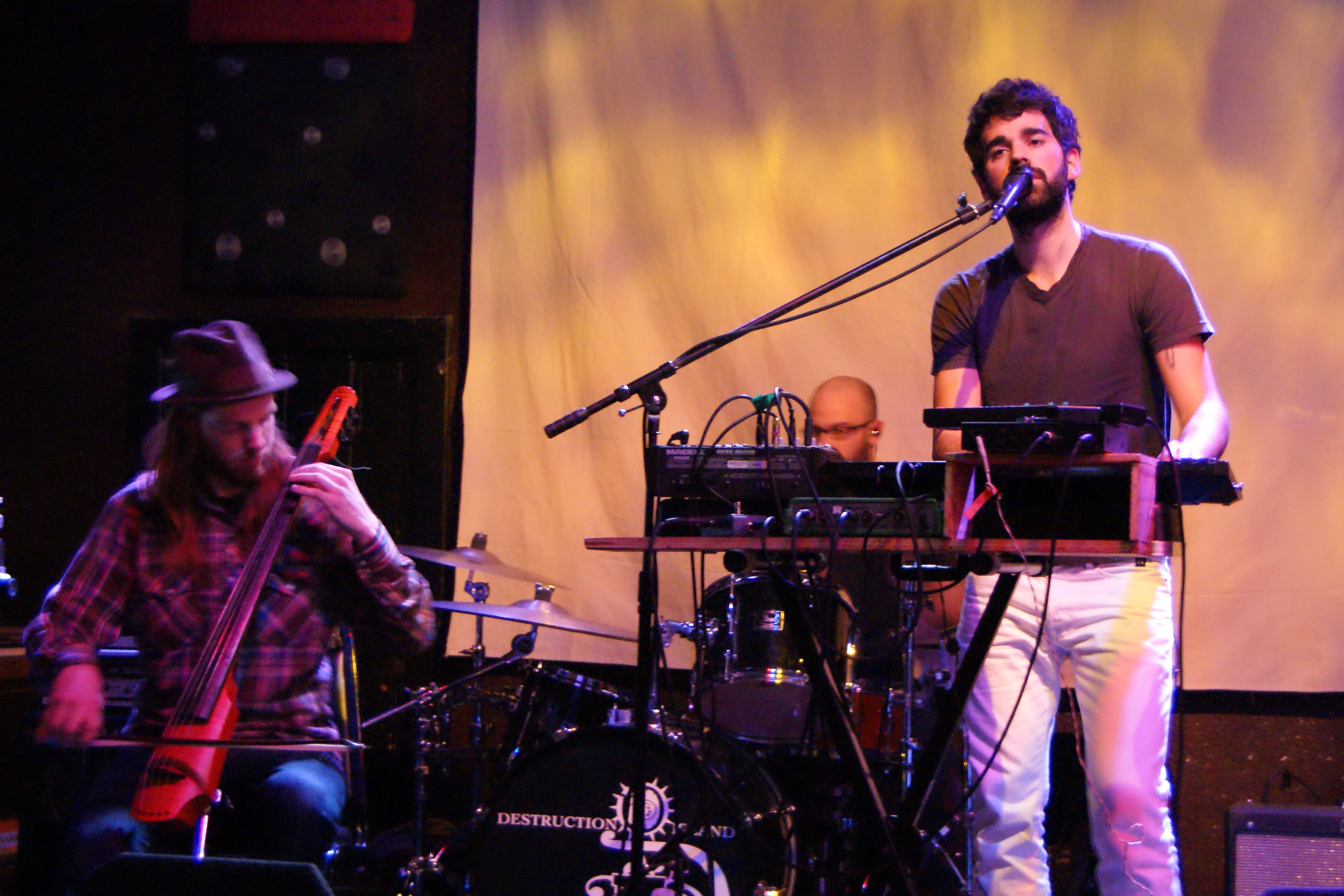
- Mike Deni and Geographer (2009) at Skylark Cafe

Background information
- Origin: San Francisco, California, U.S.
- Genres: Indie rock, dream pop, electronic rock
- Years active: 2007–present
- Labels: Roll Call, Modern Art, Tricycle, Geographer Music
- Members: Mike Deni
- Past members: Nathan Blaz; Brian Ostreicher
- Website: www.geographermusic.com

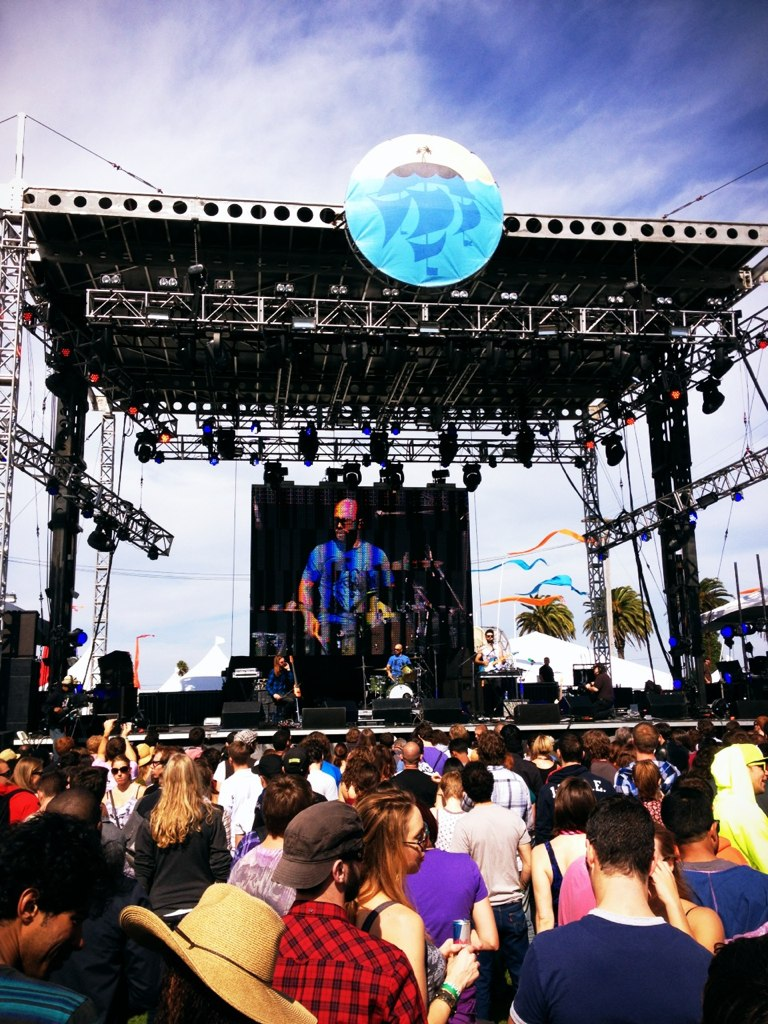
Geographer (2011) at Treasure Island Music Festival

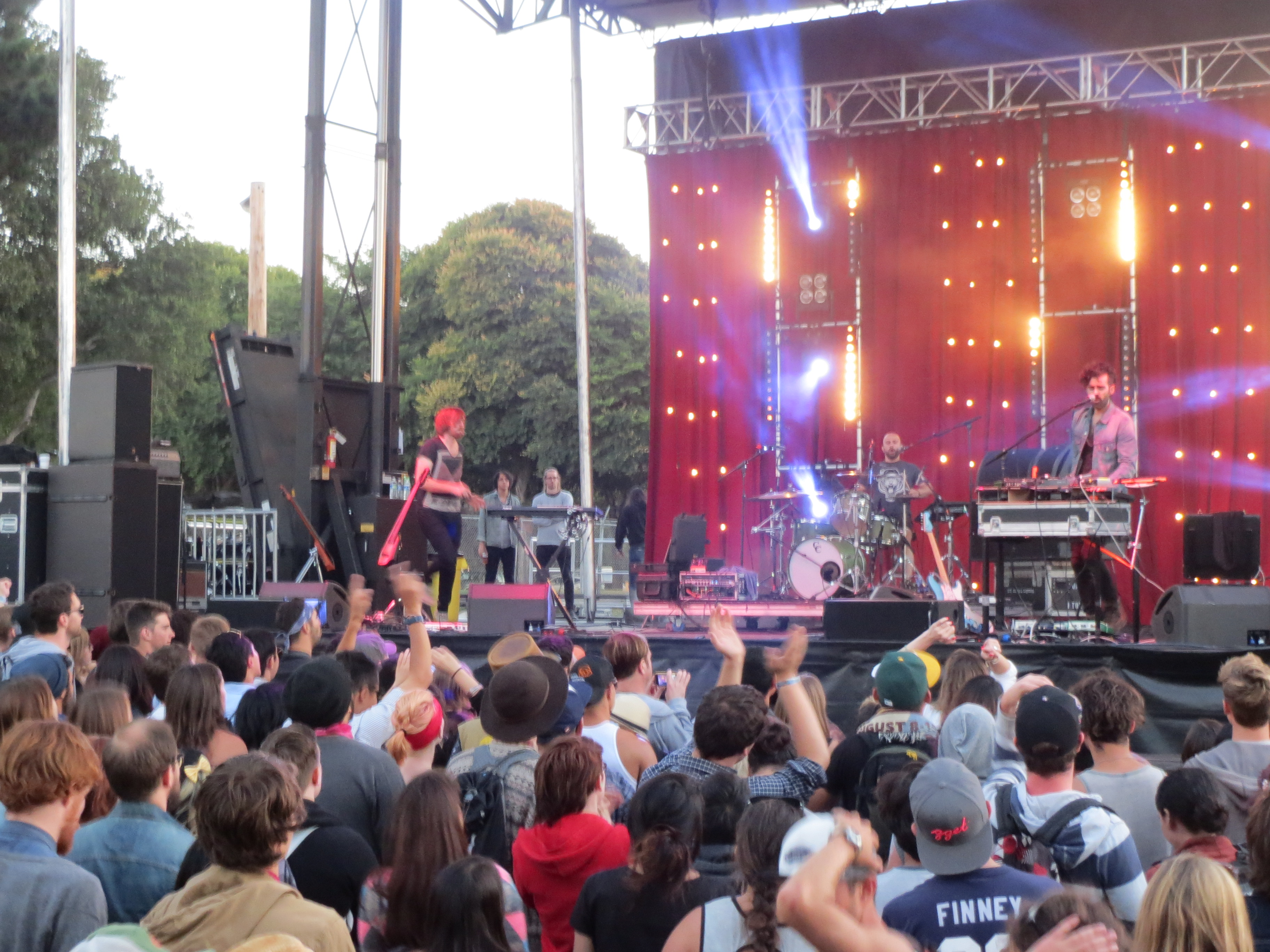
Geographer (2014) First Cities Fest, Monterey, California

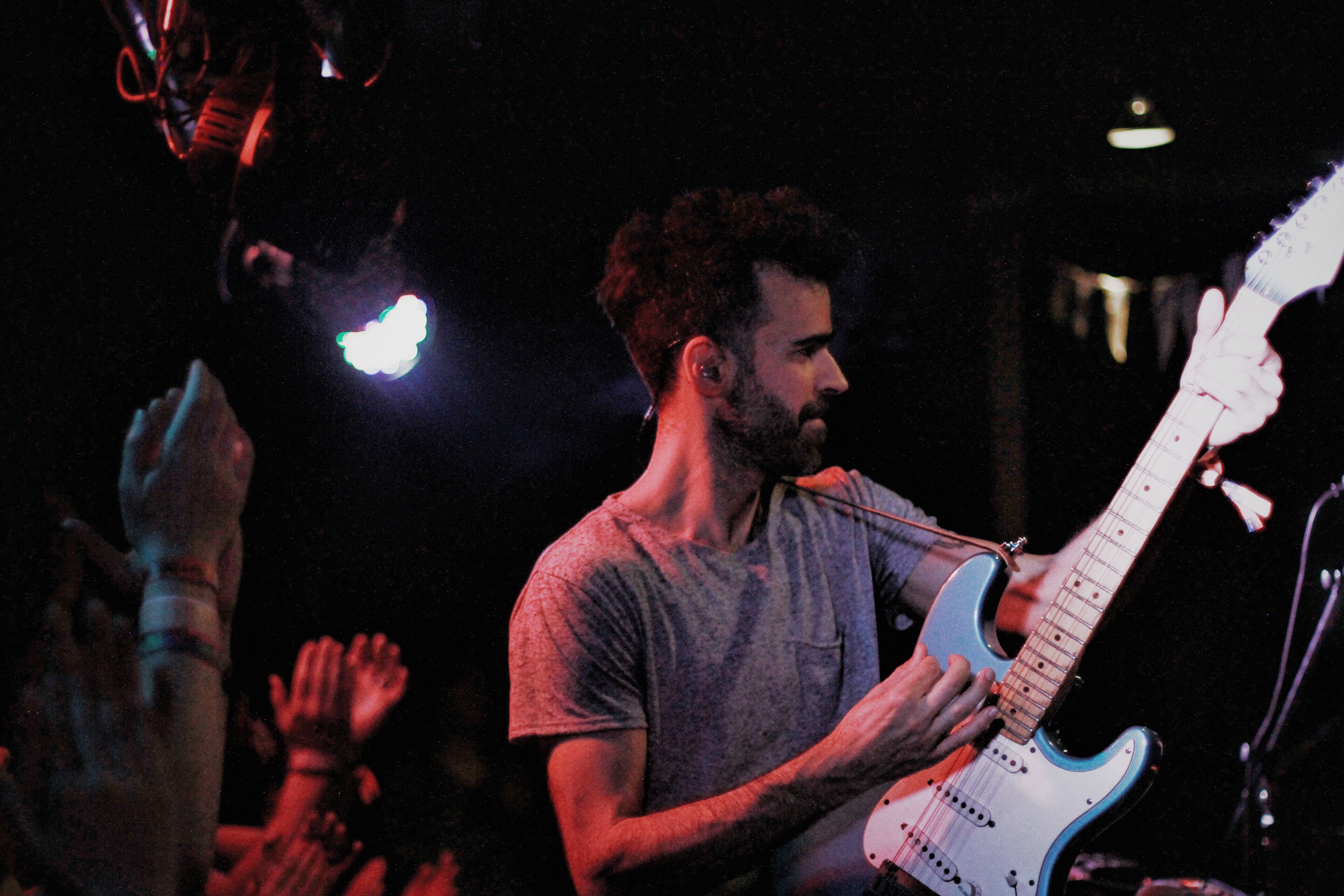
Geographer (2016) Treefort Music Fest

Geographer is an American synth-pop/indie rock band founded in 2007 by Mike Deni in San Francisco, California.

Deni has described his sound as being "soulful music from outer space"; using analog, electronic and acoustic elements to craft dense layers and unique sound textures. As Geographer, Deni has released multiple albums, including Innocent Ghosts in 2008, Myth in 2012, and Ghost Modern in 2015; along with two EPs, Animal Shapes in 2010, Endless Motion in 2015; and a number of 7-inch singles including, "Kites" in 2010.

== Early history ==
Deni relocated to San Francisco from New Jersey in 2005. After finding a synthesizer on the street, he began to channel his experiences into the songs that would become Innocent Ghosts. He began playing his songs locally in San Francisco at open mic nights—most notably the Hotel Utah, where he met cellist Nathan Blaz and drummer Brian Ostreicher. Blaz and Ostreicher originally met while attending the Berklee College of Music, in Boston, Massachusetts, before moving to San Francisco. After being introduced to Deni at an open mic night by mutual friend Kacey Johansing, the two would join Deni's live band.

On August 17, 2008, Deni released Innocent Ghosts independently and the band began playing around the San Francisco Bay Area. The release garnered local and national attention, with Spin magazine voting the band "[o]ne of the three undiscovered bands you need to hear now".

== Career ==
Deni signed with local Bay Area label Tricycle Records, and in December 2009, released a 7-inch single for the song "Kites" with a cover of the English rock band New Order's "Age of Consent" as the B-side.

In 2010, he followed up the single with the release of the six-song EP Animal Shapes. The digital-download version of the record also contained two bonus remixes of the songs "Kites" and "Paris" by fellow Bay Area artists Wallpaper and The Limousines. The album received favorable reviews, landing the band a "Best of" award by the SF Weekly. November 2010 marked the first major tour for the band, supporting Stars on dates across the United States beginning in the Bay Area and ending in Buffalo, NY.

In March 2011, the band signed with Modern Art Records, based in New York City, New York.

In December 2011, Paste magazine released the single "Life of Crime" from the forthcoming full-length album Myth, to be released by Modern Art Records.

O February 28, 2012, Deni released Myth. In March of the same year, the band embarked on a five-week U.S. tour with labelmate indie-pop band Miniature Tigers. On 11 August 2012, the band played a set on the Twin Peaks Stage at the Outside Lands Music and Arts Festival, in San Francisco, the largest audience for which the band had thus far performed. The set featured new songs "Life of Crime," "Lover's Game" and "Kites".

In September 2012, the band announced that it would head out on a 21-date U.S. tour with indie-rock band Freelance Whales. The tour began 4 October at Lincoln Hall in Chicago, Illinois, and ended 3 November at the Paradise Rock Club in Boston.

The band embarked on their first headlining tour of the western United States in 2013 with the band On An On. The tour began 12 January at Doug Fir Lounge in Portland, Oregon, and ended 1 February at The Echo in Los Angeles, California. The tour was a success for the band, selling out venues across the U.S. including their homecoming show at the historic Fillmore West on 31 January. The band continued touring throughout 2013 in the U.S. and Canada with support from GRMLN and Royal Bangs.

The band announced on its website in March 2014 that they would be supporting Tokyo Police Club on their North American tour. On 20 January 2015 Paste magazine premiered the single "I'm Ready" and announced his forthcoming full-length LP Ghost Modern to be released in March 2015. Prior to the release of Ghost Modern, the band headlined a sold-out show at the Fox Theater in Oakland, California as part of the Noise Pop Festival. The show debuted new songs including "Need" and "I'm Ready" which would appear on the upcoming full-length album.

Ghost Modern, Deni's third album, was released on 23 March through Roll Call Records. The album featured the previously released single "I'm Ready" as well as recently released singles "Need" and "The Guest". Prior to the release of Ghost Modern, Blaz and Osteicher stepped down as the touring band to pursue other projects that prevented them from maintaining the band's rigorous touring schedule. Deni then recruited cellist Joyce Lee, guitarist and bass player Duncan Nielsen and drummer Cody Rhodes as his touring band, headlining shows throughout the United States and South by Southwest.

Deni released a cover of Paul Simon's "I Know What I Know" through Billboard on October 26, 2015, announcing the release of the covers EP Endless Motion, which features additional covers of Kate Bush's "Cloudbusting", New Order's "Age of Consent", Felix da Housecat's "Ready 2 Wear" and Arthur Russell's "This Is How We Walk on the Moon".

On December 16, 2016, Deni independently released the Geographer single "I Want It All".

In 2018, Deni moved away from San Francisco with plans to settle in Los Angeles.

== Live ==
In live performances, Deni is known to sample and loop his vocals, saxophone, and synthesizers using an Akai Professional MIDI controller. During performances, the cellist uses an NS Designs electric cello, often combined with effects pedals to create unique sounds.

== Discography ==
=== Albums ===
- Innocent Ghosts (2008), Geographer Music
- Myth (2012), Modern Art Records
- Ghost Modern (2015), Roll Call Records
- Down and Out in the Garden of Earthly Delights (2021)
- A Mirror Brightly (2024)

=== Extended plays ===
- Animal Shapes (2010), Tricycle Records
- Endless Motion: Vol. 1 (2015), Roll Call Records
- Alone Time (2018)
- New Jersey (2019)

=== Singles ===
- "Kites" 7" (2010)
- "Life of Crime" (2012)
- "Lover's Game" (2012)
- "I'm Ready" (2015)
- "Need" (2015)
- "The Guest" (2015)
- "I Want It All" (2016)
- "Read My Mind" (2017)
- "So Low" (2017)
- "Summer of my Discontentment" (2019)
- "Love is Wasted in the Dark" (2019)
- "When Will I Belong" (2020)
- "Slave To The Rhythm" (2020)
- "Love Is Madness" (2020)
- "Alibi" (2020)
- "Keep Running" (2020)
- "The Other Side" (2020)
- "Kyoto" (2022)
- "The Reason" (2022)
- "When Will I Belong" (2022)
- "I Don't Remember It Starting" (2023)

== Song usage ==
- "The Morning" was used in the official trailer for the film New York, I Love You (2009).
- "Paris" was sampled in the hip-hop song Impossible by G-Side.
- "Kites", "Verona", and "Paris" were featured in Season 2 (2010) of MTV's reality-television series The Buried Life.
- "Can't You Wait" was featured in Pixar's It Gets Better anti-gay bullying campaign video.
- "Original Sin" was featured in MTV's teen comedy television series Awkward.
- "Original Sin" was featured in Buuteeq's DMS Hero Video.
- "Age of Consent" was used in Apple's iPad Mini feature spot on Apple's website.
- "Original Sin" was used in The CW's Star-Crossed.
- "Lover's Game" was featured in the Lionsgate film Date and Switch (2014).
- "Kites" was used in Valo 4life (2009), a team video for aggressive inline skate company Valo, during a montage section.
- "Blinders" was sampled in the hip hop song Blinderz by ST 2 Lettaz (2013).
- "When Will I Belong" was featured in New Amsterdam "Liftoff" (2020).
- "Get There Soon" was featured on CBS's God Friended Me in 2020 and ABC's The Rookie "The Q Word" in 2020.
- "The Reason" was used on the television series Grey's Anatomy.

== Remixes ==
- Waters - "Got to My Head" (2014)
- Vacationer - "Good As New" (2013)
- Blondefire - "Where The Kids Are" (2013)
- Bogan Via - "Kanye" (2013)
- Rubblebucket - "Oversaturated" (2012)

== See also ==
- Culture of San Francisco
- List of bands from the San Francisco Bay Area
- List of dream-pop artists
- List of indie-rock musicians
- Music of California
