= Marumari =

- Origin: Albany, New York
- Genres: IDM; electronic; electronica; hip hop; ambient; glitch; downtempo
- Years active: 1998–present
- Labels: Carpark Records; Cunsanto Records; Audiobot Records
- Members: Josh Presseisen; Sasha Presseisen
- Website: marumari.com

Marumari is an American intelligent dance music band consisting of Josh and Sasha Presseisen, and is based in Albany, New York.

== Discography ==
- Story of the Heavens (1999 · Cunsanto Records)
- Ballad of the Round Ball (1999 · Carpark Records)
- The Wolves Hollow (2000 · Carpark Records)
- Supermogadon (2001 · Carpark Records)
- 4876 (2001 · Audiobot Records)
- The Remixes (2002 · Carpark Records)
- Path scrubber EP (2005 · Self-release)
- Pegasys (2019 · Self-release)
- Hidden Tracks and Rarities 2001-2005 (2025 · Carpark Records)
