= Popstrangers =

Musical group

Popstrangers are a rock band formed in 2009 by Joel Flyger (guitar/vocals/synthesiser), Adam Page (bass), and David Larson (drums), three native New Zealanders who now reside in London. Popstrangers formed after meeting through mutual friends, sharing an interest in 80's New Zealand punk bands and a desire to create music with like-minded people.

After releasing several singles on New Zealand independent label Flying Nun, Popstrangers delivered their debut album Antipodes in 2013. Recorded in the basement of a 1930s dancehall, Antipodes features dissonant, claustrophobic melodies, anchored by the languid affectations of Flyger's vocals. Their sophomore project Fortuna soon followed in 2014, further developing the band's psychedelic pop sound and receiving much critical acclaim upon release.

Following a disappearance that lasted several years, Popstrangers returned in June 2022 and released a 10 track album, In Spirit, via Rice Is Nice Records.
