= Elestial Sound =

American Music label Company

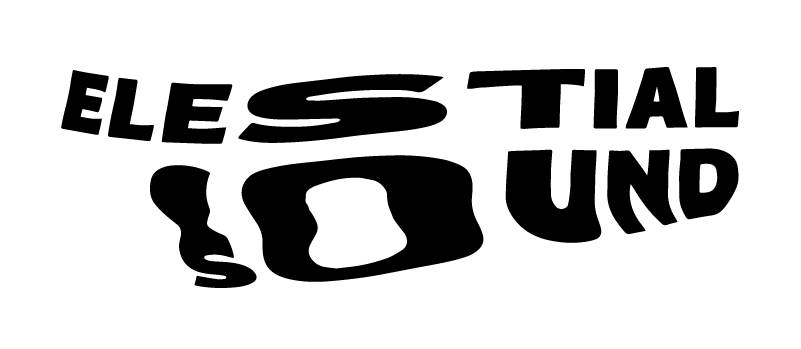
- Founded: 2011
- Founder: Davis Hart, Gabriel Ortiz
- Genre: Electronic, experimental
- Country of origin: United States
- Location: Gainesville, Florida
- Official website: www.elestialsound.com

Elestial Sound is an art collective and record label based in Gainesville, Florida, US.

Founded in 2011, the label focused on printing and distributing Florida-based electronic and experimental music. It then became an artist cooperative. The cooperative structure accommodates a fluctuating number of member-owners: twenty to thirty individuals who operate the company's marketing, video, live production, A&R, and sales departments. The label is known in the region for its live production consisting of site-specific art installations that serve as immersive performance environments for its artists.

== History ==
=== Formation ===
Elestial Sound began as an amalgamation of the many elements and people involved in the North Florida music scene. An art studio in Gainesville, Florida, called the Church of Holy Colors, run by Evan Galbicka and collaborators Joey Fillastre and Felici Asteinza, became a nexus for many of the future Elestial Sound members and served as a DIY venue space for the thriving experimental and electronic music scene in the region. The fusion of art installation and musical performance by the community of artists and musicians in the area helped shape the aesthetic and direction of the label in the following years.

=== Early years ===
Established in September 2011 by Gabriel Ortiz, the label celebrated its first two releases with an artist showcase in their hometown of Gainesville. In December 2011, Ortiz partnered with Davis Hart, a native to the Florida music scene. As a result, the company expanded its vision to include comprehensive artist development and support, providing in-house marketing, video production, and tour support with waste vegetable oil-powered buses.

Within the first three months of 2012, Hundred Waters' debut album was released and two touring buses were converted to run on vegetable oil, providing support to bands Jane Jane Pollock, Levek and Hundred Waters on nationwide tours. During these initial tours, Elestial Sound simultaneously curated showcases at South by Southwest and Florida-based festival Total Bummer 3D featuring headliners Prince Rama and Hundred Waters.

In May 2012, Hart acquired a warehouse in Gainesville which served as a venue for the label and multipurpose workshop for stage construction and bus maintenance. The Elestial Sound Headquarters would go on to host a number of label showcases throughout 2013 and 2014, featuring Hundred Waters, Quintron and Miss Pussycat, Levek, Jane Jane Pollock, the Dewars, MSNRA, Ghost Fields, Euglossine and others. These early shows in their own space helped build a reputation for the label in Gainesville as a live production company capable of combining fine art and live music into a cohesive experience.

=== Transition to cooperative structure ===
In late 2013, Ortiz and Hart decided to restructure the company into a cooperative. Without any real precedent for a cooperative record label, Hart took ideas from producer and worker cooperatives in the grocery industry to write the company's bylaws. Since 2013, the cooperative has continued to release records, provide artist development and construct site-specific art installations around the Southeast.

The cooperative consists of a fluctuating cast of worker and producer member-owners. A board of directors guides the label in its artist selection and financial decisions and its worker owners carry out the company's day-to-day logistics. The cooperative uses a dynamic equity split system in which the owners earn equity in the company based on their individual contributions to the cooperative.

In July 2014, a new property was acquired in order to construct a recording studio and house the different departments of the company. Renovations began shortly after the acquisition and the facility is expected to be fully operational by 2017.

== Discography ==
- ES000 - Arbol Transmissions/Floating Split - Arbol Transmissions, Floating
- ES001 - City - Floating
- ES002 - Self Titled - Orchal and Vir
- ES003 - Self Titled - Jane Jane Pollock
- ES004 - Chefs Volume I - He Dog, High Rule
- ES005 - Self Titled - Hundred Waters
- ES006 - Elestial Sound 2013 Compilation
- ES007 - Olive Juice - Emily Reo
- ES008 - Tristaria - Euglossine
- ES009 - Nocturnal - MSNRA
- ES010 - Self Titled - Chromadadata
- ES011 - Chefs Volume II H2O - Orchal & Vir, Floating
- ES012 - Lustrous - Euglossine
- ES013 - Pontchartrain Beach - Danny
- ES014 - Hyper Pollen Temple - Kane Pour
- ES015 - Elestial Sound 2015 Compilation
- ES016 - Self Titled - Woset
- ES017 - Rise and Fall - Mariama Ndure
- ES018 - Stress Dreams - Jacob Silver
- ES019 - Fruit - AAA
- ES020 - Elestial Sound 2016 Compilation
- ES021 - Bhsaaveaegi - Jeffry Astin
