= Gibson Blueshawk =

Hollow body electric guitar (1996–2006; 2015)

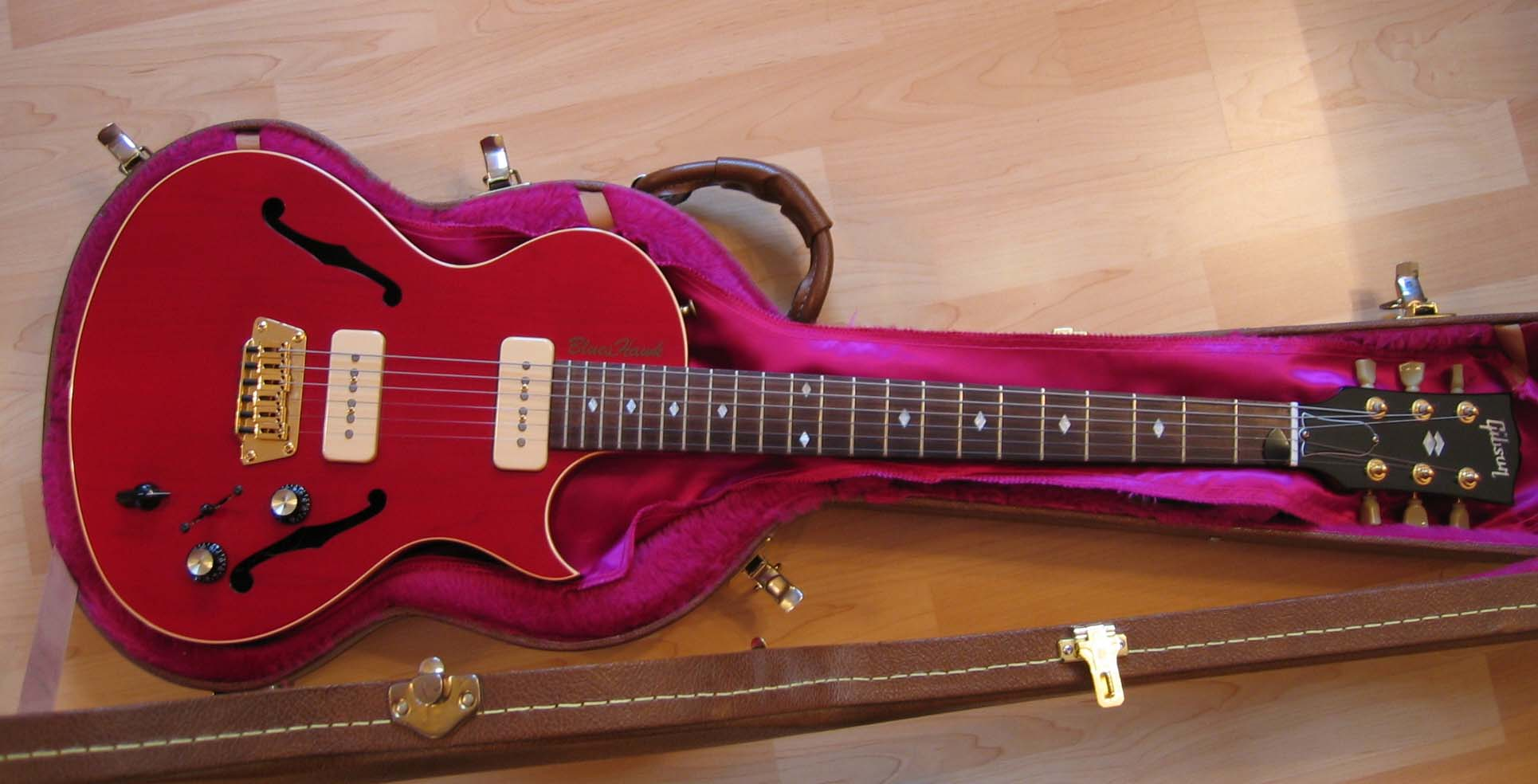
- Manufacturer: Gibson, Epiphone
- Period: 1996–2006 (Gibson), 2015 (Epiphone)

Construction
- Body type: Semi-solid - two sound cavities with f-holes
- Neck joint: Narrow with slight V shape

Woods
- Body: Maple cap over Poplar (Gibson) Maple cap with a Flame Maple veneer over Mahogany (Epiphone)
- Neck: Mahogany
- Fretboard: Rosewood

Hardware
- Bridge: Low-profile string-through-body system with Maestro tremolo option
- Pickup: Two Blues 90 with hum canceling dummy coil (Gibson) Two Epiphone P-90 Pros (Epiphone)

Colors available
- Heritage Cherry (transparent red), Chicago Blue (transparent blue), Ebony (black)

The Gibson Blueshawk is a discontinued model of semi-hollow body electric guitar. It was available between 1996 and 2006 as a Gibson model designed mainly for blues players (hence the name). It superficially resembles the Les Paul in that the body outline is similar. The Blueshawk was discontinued by Gibson in Spring 2006, and returned in 2015 under the Epiphone brand.

Carl Perkins received the first prototype Blueshawk in 1996. A variant on the Blueshawk is named Gibson Little Lucille and features a stop tailpiece and tune-o-matic bridge.

== Construction ==
The Blueshawk has a number of distinctive features that distinguish it from virtually all other Gibsons. The Blueshawk's body outline is the same as a slightly earlier range of guitars — the Nighthawks (1993–1999) — but unlike the Nighthawks, the Blueshawk is a semi-hollow bodied guitar with twin f-holes.

Other distinctive / innovative features include:

- 25.5 inch scale length (the same as many Fenders, Gibsons more typically have a 24.75 inch scale length).
- Through-body stringing and bridge construction - similar to the Fender Telecaster
- Blues 90 pickups (superficially resembling a P-90 pickup)
- Noise reduction circuitry which employs a dummy coil
- A Varitone circuit (similar to that used on the Gibson ES-345) - the Varitone circuit is a mid-cut/band-stop filter with a choice of five center frequencies
- The Blueshawk is a light guitar (less than 7lbs) - the body is made from poplar, capped with maple - the body is small and relatively thin and has two cavities - the hardware is minimal.
- The Blueshawk has a contour carved into the back - similar to the Fender Stratocaster.
- Simple control set - master volume, master tone, 3-way pickup selector, 6 way rotary Varitone control switch.
- Just above the fingerboard and parallel to it, between the front (neck) pickup and the front strap pin, there is a cursive-writing emblem using paint, saying “Blues Hawk.”

== Epiphone version ==
During the 2015 Winter NAMM Show, Epiphone revealed a "reissue" of the Gibson Bluehawk called the Epiphone Blueshawk Deluxe. While it has similar specifications to the original Gibson version, the Blueshawk Deluxe features a flamed maple veneer on top of a solid maple top, Epiphone's own PRO-90 single-coil pickups, a bound fingerboard, and no option for a Maestro tremolo, instead of a non-figured maple top, Blues 90s single coils, unbound fingerboard, and option for a tremolo.
