= Melkbelly =

American noise rock band

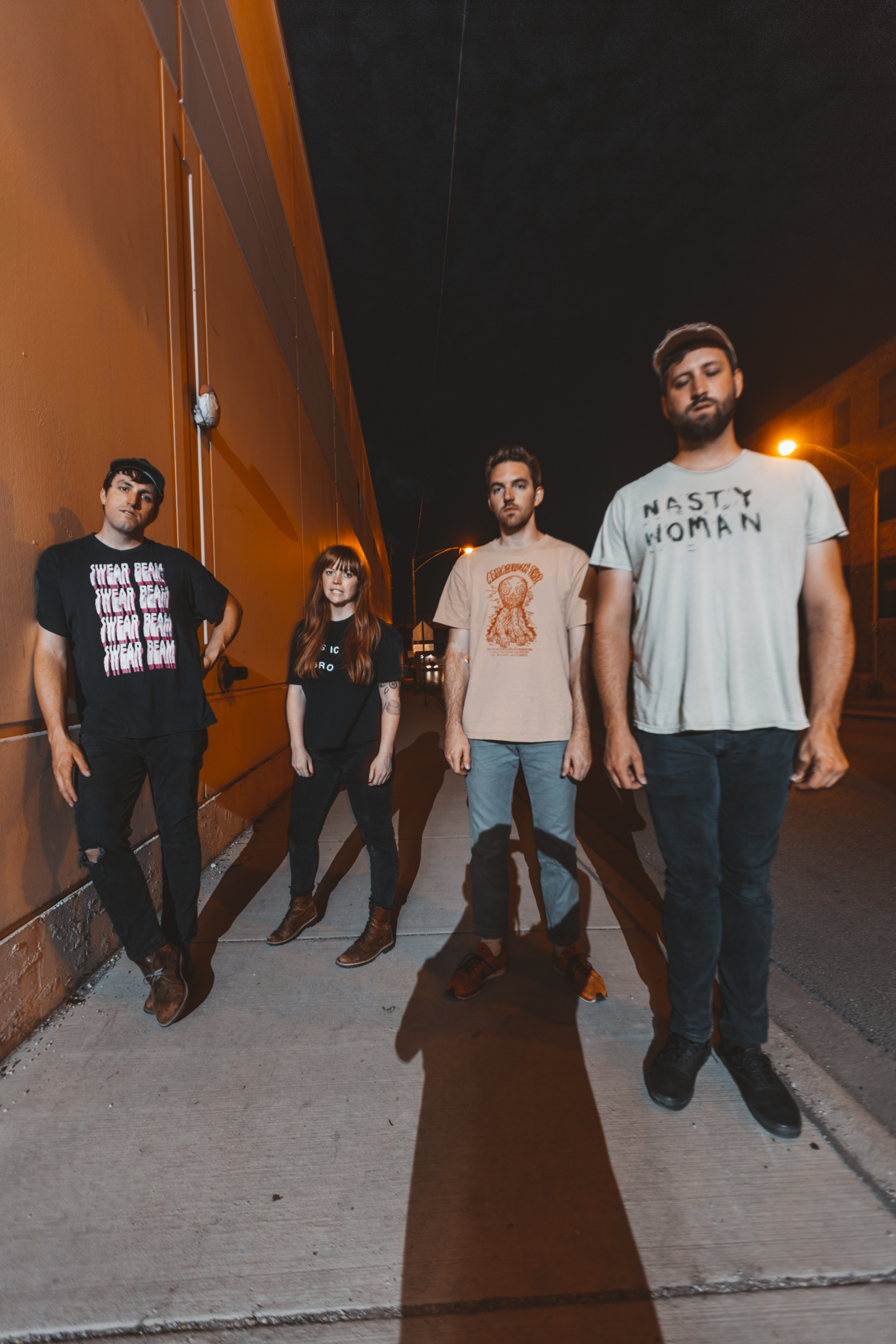

Background information
- Origin: Chicago, Illinois, U.S.
- Genres: Noise rock
- Years active: 2014–present
- Labels: Wax Nine Records / Carpark Records
- Members: Bart Winters; Liam Winters; Miranda Winters; James Wetzel

Melkbelly is an American four-piece noise rock band from Chicago, Illinois, United States, made up of Liam Winters (bass), Miranda Winters (guitar/vox), Bart Winters (guitar), and James Wetzel (drums). They are known for their frantic arrangements, toothed melodies, and blaring live show. The group has toured extensively across the US in the last couple of years, and Stereogum called them the "Most Exciting Rock Band at SXSW". They released an album titled Nothing Valley on October 13, 2017, on Wax Nine Records, a subsidiary of Carpark Records.

Their latest album, PITH, was issued in April 2020.

== Discography ==
=== EPs ===
- 2014: Pennsylvania

=== LPs ===
- 2017: Nothing Valley
- 2020: PITH

=== 7"s ===
- 2015: "B.A.T.B."
- 2016: "Mount Kool Kid" / "Elk Mountain"
