= Carpark Records =

American independent record label

- Founded: 1999
- Founder: Todd Hyman
- Distributor: Alternative Distribution Alliance
- Country of origin: United States
- Location: Washington, D.C.
- Official website: carparkrecords.com

Carpark Records is an independent record label based in Washington, D.C.

== History ==
Carpark Records was established by Todd Hyman in 1999 in New York City. In 2005, the label relocated to Washington, D.C.

Carpark has subsidiary labels. Acute Records, established in 2002, reissues obscure post-punk records under the guidance of Dan Selzer. Paw Tracks, established in 2003, releases music by Animal Collective and associated solo acts Avey Tare and Panda Bear. Wax Nine is another partner label.

Company Records, an imprint of Carpark, was established in partnership with Chaz Bear from Toro Y Moi.

In 2015, Carpark held a 16-year anniversary celebration accompanied by a basketball-themed picture disc compilation.

== Artists ==
- Agung Gede
- @
- 242.pilots
- Adventure
- Baldi/Gerycz Duo
- Beach House
- Belong
- Benny Boeldt
- The Beths
- Casino Versus Japan
- Chandos
- Chelsea Jade
- Class Actress
- Cloud Nothings
- Dan Deacon
- Dean Wareham
- Dent May
- Dinky
- Dog Bite
- Ducks Ltd.
- EAR PWR
- Ecstatic Sunshine
- Ed Schrader's Music Beat
- Emily Reo
- Erin Anne
- Evan Gipson
- Fat Tony
- GEMS
- Greg Davis
- Greys
- GRMLN
- Hans Pucket
- Introverted Dancefloor
- Jake Mandell
- Keith Fullerton Whitman
- Kid 606
- Kit Clayton
- Laumė (fka MADEIRA)
- Les Sins
- Lesser Gonzalez Alvarez
- Lexie Mountain Boys
- Light Pollution
- Madeline Kenney
- Marumari
- Melkbelly – on Wax Nine Records (subsidiary)
- Memory Tapes
- Miranda Winters – on Wax Nine Records (subsidiary)
- Montag
- Ogurusu Norihide
- Over the Atlantic
- Palm
- Popstrangers
- Prince Rama
- Remy
- Rituals of Mine
- Sad13
- Safety Scissors
- Samuel Muzaliwa
- Signer aka Bevan Smith
- Skylar Spence
- So Takahashi
- Speedy Ortiz
- Takagi Masakatsu
- TEEN
- Wendyfix
- WZT Hearts
- Young Magic

== See also ==
- Carpark Records artists
- Carpark Records albums
- List of record labels
