= Beach House discography =

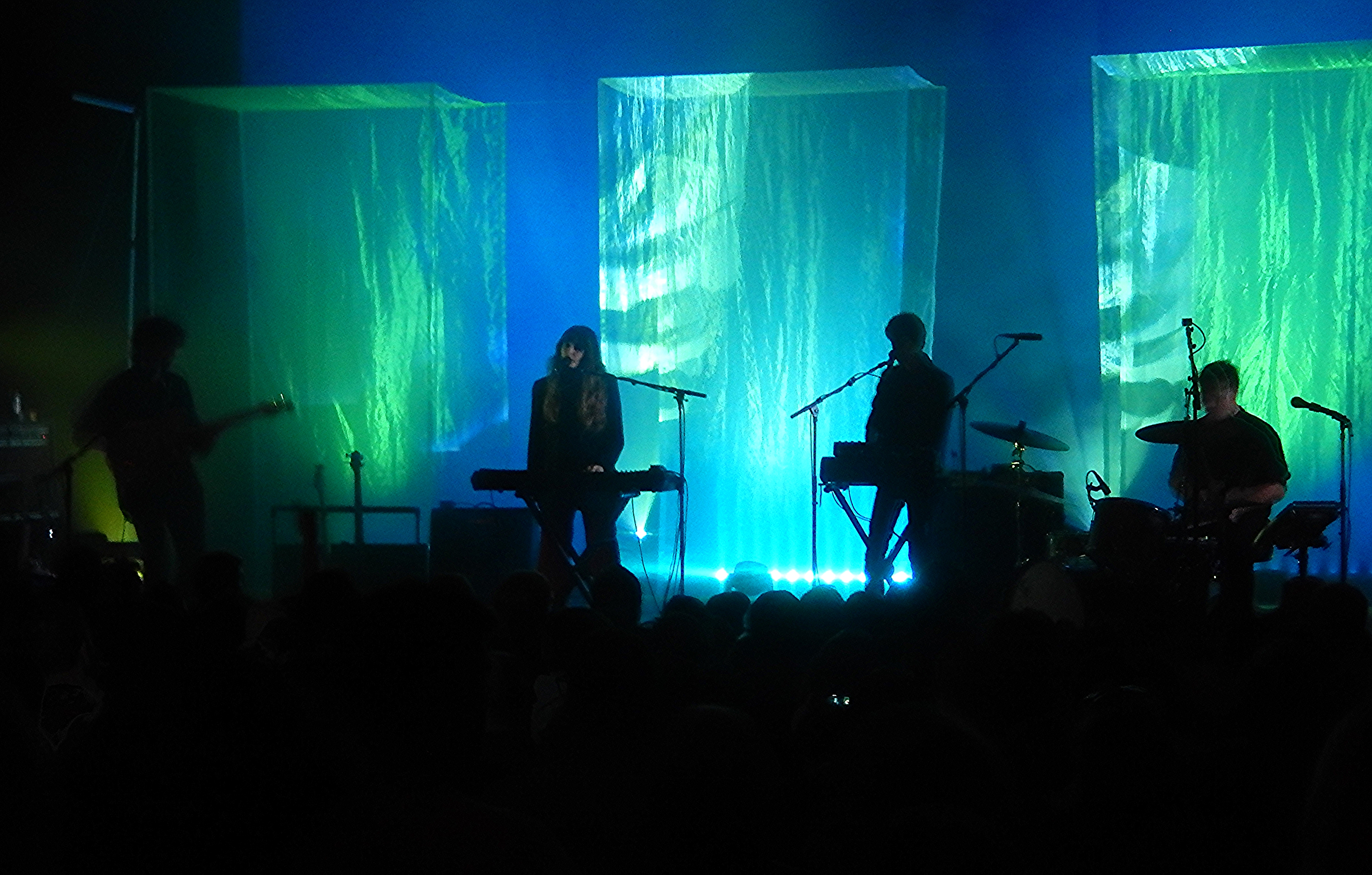
- Beach House performing live in 2015
- Studio albums: 8
- EPs: 7
- Compilation albums: 1
- Singles: 17
- Music videos: 16
- Promotional singles: 9

The discography of dream pop band Beach House consists of eight studio albums, one compilation album, seven extended plays, 17 singles, nine promotional singles and 16 music videos. The band was formed in 2004 in Baltimore, Maryland, by sole members Victoria Legrand and Alex Scally, who met each other in the city through a mutual friend in 2004, originally part of college-formed band Daggerhearts.

On October 3, 2006, they would release their self-titled debut album through Carpark Records, Beach House, which was recorded on a budget of reportedly about $1,000. On February 26, 2008, they released their second studio album Devotion, which would become the band's first album to appear on the US Billboard 200 chart, debuting at number 195 with 3,000 copies sold within its first week. Announced in August 2008, they released their debut single, "Used to Be", on October 21, as a 7-inch vinyl release, which included a 4-track demo of "Apple Orchard" as its B-side. In September 2009, it was announced that the duo had signed onto Sub Pop, marking their departure from Carpark, along with a confirmation that the duo were recording their third studio album, for which they released its lead single "Norway" in November of that year. The band's third studio album, Teen Dream, was released on January 26, 2010, to critical acclaim, and debuted at number 43 on the Billboard 200. By April 2012, according to Nielsen SoundScan, their self-titled album had sold 24,000 copies, with Devotion selling 49,000 and Teen Dream selling 137,000.

They released fourth studio album, Bloom, was released on May 15, 2012, to similar acclaim as Teen Dream. It was supported by two acclaimed singles, "Myth" and "Lazuli". The album debuted at number seven on the US Billboard 200, selling 41,000 copies in its first week; this is the duo's best selling album and highest entry on the chart. It also debuted at number 15 on the UK Albums Chart. By 2013, Bloom had sold over 100,000 copies worldwide. On August 28, 2015, their fifth studio album Depression Cherry was released, and debuted at number eight on the Billboard 200, selling over 27,000 copies within its first week. On October 16 of the same year, they released their sixth album Thank Your Lucky Stars, which debuted at number 39 on the chart, selling 10,000 copies in its first week. On June 30, 2017, the band would release the 14-track compilation album B-Sides and Rarities, which would serve as a "cleaning out the closet" process in order to make room for a new creative process. On May 11, 2018, Beach House released their seventh studio album, 7, with support of the singles "Lemon Glow", "Dive", "Dark Spring", "Black Car" and "Lose Your Smile", the latter being released as a 7-inch single with "Alien" as its B-side. "Alien" was later released as a standalone single on October 23, 2018.

In 2021, six years after its initial release, "Space Song", the third track from their fifth studio album Depression Cherry, became a sleeper hit when it went viral on TikTok and experienced a resurgence in streams, later receiving a platinum certification by the Recording Industry Association of America (RIAA) in January 2022. After its appearance on the third episode of the Netflix-original television series Wednesday (2022), the song earned over four million streams in the United States, within the November 25–December 1, 2022, tracking week. With the support of the streams, the song debuted at number 20 on the US Hot Rock & Alternative Songs chart, marking their first appearance on the chart, later peaking at number 13 on the chart the following week. Their eighth studio album, Once Twice Melody, was released in four chapters starting November 2021. The entire album was also released in full, and was issued in physical formats on February 18, 2022.

== Albums ==
=== Studio albums ===
List of studio albums, with selected chart positions
| Title | Details | Peak chart positions | | | | | | | | | | Sales | Certifications |
| Title | Details | US | AUS | BEL | FRA | IRE | NL | POR | SPA | SWI | UK | Sales | Certifications |
|---|---|---|---|---|---|---|---|---|---|---|---|---|---|
| Beach House | Released: October 3, 2006; Label: Carpark; Formats: LP, CD, cassette, digital download | — | — | — | — | — | — | — | — | — | — | US: 24,000 (Note: US album sales for Beach House as of April 2012.) | |
| Devotion | Released: February 26, 2008; Label: Carpark; Formats: LP, CD, cassette, digital download | 195 | — | — | — | — | — | — | — | — | — | US: 49,000 (Note: US album sales for Devotion as of April 2012.) | |
| Teen Dream | Released: January 26, 2010; Label: Sub Pop; Formats: LP, CD, cassette, digital download | 43 | — | 36 | 48 | — | — (Note: Teen Dream did not enter the Dutch Album Top 100, but entered the Dutch Alternative Top 30 chart at number 14.) | — | — | — | 78 | US: 137,000 (Note: US album sales for Teen Dream as of April 2012.) | RIAA: Gold; BPI: Silver |
| Bloom | Released: May 15, 2012; Label: Sub Pop; Formats: LP, CD, cassette, digital download | 7 | 40 | 10 | 59 | 10 | 54 | 10 | 22 | 33 | 15 | US: 41,000 (Note: US first week album sales for Bloom.); WW: 100,000 (Note: Global sales for Bloom as of March 2013.) | RIAA: Gold |
| Depression Cherry | Released: August 28, 2015; Label: Sub Pop; Formats: LP, CD, cassette, digital download | 8 | 34 | 13 | 30 | 27 | 16 | 12 | 37 | 58 | 17 | US: 27,000 (Note: US first week album sales for Depression Cherry.) | RIAA: Platinum |
| Thank Your Lucky Stars | Released: October 16, 2015; Label: Sub Pop; Formats: LP, CD, cassette, digital download | 39 | — | 43 | 108 | — | — | 29 | 89 | — | 145 | US: 10,000 (Note: US first week album sales for Thank Your Lucky Stars.) | |
| 7 | Released: May 11, 2018; Label: Sub Pop; Formats: LP, CD, cassette, digital download | 20 | 39 | 10 | 87 | 28 | 31 | 17 | 19 | 54 | 16 | | |
| Once Twice Melody | Released: February 18, 2022; Label: Sub Pop; Formats: LP, CD, cassette, digital download, streaming | 12 | 68 | 18 | 138 | 78 | 64 | — | 81 | 22 | 65 | US: 20,300 (Note: US first week album sales for Once Twice Melody.) | |
"—" denotes a recording that did not chart or was not released in that territory.

=== Compilation albums ===
List of compilation albums, with selected chart positions
| Title | Details | Peak chart positions | | | | | | |
| Title | Details | US | US Alt. | US Indie | US Rock | BEL | SPA | UK Indie |
|---|---|---|---|---|---|---|---|---|
| B-Sides and Rarities | Released: June 30, 2017; Label: Sub Pop; Formats: LP, CD, cassette, digital download | 137 | 17 | 5 | 27 | 159 | 79 | 26 |

== Extended plays ==
List of extended plays, with selected chart positions
| Title | Details | Peak chart positions | | | | |
| Title | Details | US Sales | US Indie | SCO | UK Sales | UK Indie |
|---|---|---|---|---|---|---|
| Daytrotter Session - Feb 1, 2010 | Released: February 1, 2010; Label: Daytrotter; Formats: Digital download | — | — | — | — | — |
| Zebra | Released: April 17, 2010; Label: Sub Pop; Formats: LP, digital download | — | — | — | — | — |
| iTunes Session | Released: August 24, 2010; Label: Sub Pop; Formats: Digital download | — | — | — | — | — |
| Once Twice Melody: Chapter 1 – Pink Funeral | Released: November 10, 2021; Label: Sub Pop; Formats: Digital download | — | — | — | — | — |
| Once Twice Melody: Chapter 2 – New Romance | Released: December 8, 2021; Label: Sub Pop; Formats: Digital download | — | — | — | — | — |
| Once Twice Melody: Chapter 3 – Masquerade | Released: January 19, 2022; Label: Sub Pop; Formats: Digital download | — | — | — | — | — |
| Become | Released: April 22, 2023; Label: Sub Pop; Formats: LP, CD, cassette | 24 | 37 | 79 | 74 | 22 |

== Singles ==
List of singles, with selected chart positions, showing year released and album name
| Title | Year | Peak chart positions | | | | | | | Certifications | Album |
| Title | Year | US AAA | US Sales | BEL | MEX | POR | UK Sales | UK Indie | Certifications | Album |
|---|---|---|---|---|---|---|---|---|---|---|
| "Used to Be" | 2008 | — | 13 | — | — | — | — | 27 | | Teen Dream |
| "Norway" | 2009 | — | — | — | 12 | — | 41 | — | | Teen Dream |
| "Zebra" | 2010 | — | 14 | — | — | — | 96 | — | | Teen Dream |
| "Myth" | 2012 | — | — | 106 | 41 | 42 | — | 40 | RIAA: Platinum | Bloom |
| "Lazuli" | 2012 | — | — | 124 | — | — | 45 | — | | Bloom |
| "Sparks" | 2015 | — | — | — | — | — | — | — | | Depression Cherry |
| "Chariot" | 2017 | — | — | — | — | — | — | — | | B-Sides and Rarities |
| "Lemon Glow" | 2018 | — | — | — (Note: "Lemon Glow" did not enter the Flanders Ultratop Top 50, but charted as an "extra tip" on the Flanders Ultratop Bubbling Under chart.) | 47 | — | — | — | | 7 |
| "Dive" | 2018 | — | — | — | — | — | — | — | | 7 |
| "Dark Spring" | 2018 | — | — | — (Note: "Dark Spring" did not enter the Flanders Ultratop Top 50, but charted as an "extra tip" on the Flanders Ultratop Bubbling Under chart.) | — | — | — | — | | 7 |
| "Black Car" | 2018 | — | — | — (Note: "Black Car" did not enter the Flanders Ultratop Top 50, but charted as an "extra tip" on the Flanders Ultratop Bubbling Under chart.) | — | — | — | — | | 7 |
| "Drunk in LA" | 2018 | — | — | — | — | — | — | — | | 7 |
| "Lose Your Smile" | 2018 | — | — | — | — | — | — | — | | 7 |
| "Alien" | 2018 | — | — | — | — | — | — | — | | Non-album single |
| "Once Twice Melody" | 2021 | 15 | — | — | — | — | — | — | | Once Twice Melody |
| "Hurts to Love" | 2022 | — | — | — | — | — | — | — | | Once Twice Melody |
| "Superstar" | 2022 | — | — | — | — | — | — | — | | Once Twice Melody |
| "April Suzanne" | 2026 | — | — | — | — | — | 31 | — | | Music and Dreams: 50th Anniversary Edition |
"—" denotes a recording that did not chart or was not released in that territory.

== Promotional singles ==
List of singles, with selected chart positions, showing year released and album name
| Title | Year | Peak chart positions | | | | | | Certifications | Album |
| Title | Year | US Rock | BEL | CAN | LTU | UK Indie | WW | Certifications | Album |
|---|---|---|---|---|---|---|---|---|---|
| "Master of None" | 2007 | — | — | — | — | — | — | BPI: Silver | Beach House |
| "Lover of Mine" | 2010 | — | — | — | — | — | — | | Teen Dream |
| "10 Mile Stereo" | 2010 | — | — | — | — | — | — | | Teen Dream |
| "Wild" | 2012 | — | 102 | — | — | — | — | | Bloom |
| "Other People" | 2012 | — | — | — | — | — | — | | Bloom |
| "PPP" | 2015 | — | — | — | — | — | — | RIAA: Gold | Depression Cherry |
| "Beyond Love" | 2015 | — | — | — | — | — | — | | Depression Cherry |
| "Space Song" | 2015 | 13 | — | 81 | 72 | 32 | 184 | RIAA: 6× Platinum; BPI: Platinum | Depression Cherry |
| "Majorette" | 2016 | — | — | — | — | — | — | | Thank Your Lucky Stars |
"—" denotes a recording that did not chart or was not released in that territory.

== Other certified songs ==
List of songs, showing certifications
| Title | Year | Certifications | Album |
|---|---|---|---|
| "Silver Soul" | 2010 | RIAA: Gold; BPI: Silver | Teen Dream |
| "Wildflower" | 2015 | RIAA: Gold | Depression Cherry |
"—" denotes a recording that did not chart or was not released in that territory.

== Guest appearances ==
List of guest appearances, showing year released and accompanying album
| Title | Year | Album |
|---|---|---|
| "Play the Game" (Note: "Play the Game" was included as an iTunes-exclusive bonus track from Dark Was the Night.) | 2009 | Dark Was the Night |
| "Saturn Song" | 2014 | The Space Project |
| "Sanctuary" | 2022 | For the Birds: The Birdsong Project, Vol. I |

== Music videos ==
List of music videos, showing release year and director(s)
| Title | Year | Director(s) | Ref. |
|---|---|---|---|
| "Master of None" (version 1) | 2007 | Justin Durel | |
| "Master of None" (version 2) | 2007 | Dan Sully | |
| "You Came to Me" | 2008 | Skyzz Cyzyk | |
| "Heart of Chambers" | 2008 | Alistair Legrand | |
| "Gila" | 2008 | Jon Irone | |
| "Used to Be" | 2008 | Matt Amato | |
| "Lazuli" | 2012 | Allen Cordell | |
| "Wild" | 2012 | Johan Renck | |
| "New Year" | 2013 | Beach House | |
| "Wishes" | 2013 | Eric Wareheim | |
| "The Traveller" | 2016 | Jennifer Juniper Stratford | |
| "Chariot" | 2017 | Beach House | |
| "Dark Spring" | 2018 | Zia Anger | |
| "Black Car" | 2018 | Alistair Legrand | |
| "Drunk in LA" | 2018 | Peter Kember | |
| "Pay No Mind" | 2018 | Michael Hirsch | |
