= ITunes Session (Beach House EP) =

iTunes Session
- Current cover

EP by Beach House
- Released: August 24, 2010
- Recorded: 2010
- Length: 25:22
- Label: Sub Pop
- Producers: Beach House; Chris Coady

Beach House chronology
Teen Dream (2010)	iTunes Session (2010)	Bloom (2012)

Alternative cover
- Original cover

iTunes Session is an extended play by American dream pop band Beach House. It was released on August 24, 2010, through Sub Pop. It features a new song, "White Moon", as well as live versions of four songs from their third studio album Teen Dream, released on January 26 of that same year, and "Gila", from their second studio album Devotion (2008). All tracks are written, produced and mixed by the band, with contributions from Chris Coady, who produced Teen Dream.

== Background and recording ==
In September 2009, it was announced that Beach House had signed onto independent record label Sub Pop, marking their departure from Carpark, where they released their first two albums, along with a confirmation that the duo were recording their third studio album. In October of that same year, the duo announced their third studio album, Teen Dream. With the record deal, they were able to produce a DVD version of the album, meeting their expectations, as well as hire a producer, Chris Coady. The album was recorded at Dreamland Studios in Hurley, New York. Despite Teen Dream being leaked on the Internet at the near-end of 2009, it later saw an official release on January 26, 2010, becoming their first album release through Sub Pop, and was met with critical acclaim upon release.

It was announced in August 2010 that the band would release an iTunes Session EP. Alex Scally stated that they were hesitant on recording session since iTunes requested that they would record a "stripped-down" live session. The EP was produced by the band and Chris Coady, whom Scally felt that with him, they would "be able to make [the session] meaningful". Among the six tracks, "White Moon" is a new track and was not previously released in any of the band's previous studio albums. The track, as described by Alex Young from Consequence, starts with a "twinkling organ [... and] Legrand quickly lays down the first verse, and Scally adds dreamy guitar picking just as Daniel J. Franz’s sample-esque drumming kicks in".

== Release and reception ==
Professional ratings
Review scores
Source	Rating
Beats Per Minute	81%

iTunes Session was released on August 24, 2010, through Sub Pop. On May 6, 2010, three months prior to the EP's release, "White Moon" was performed at the band's show at Webster Hall in New York City. Alex Phillimore of Beats Per Minute gave the EP an 81% rating, and stated that "the strength of the material on offer from their later – and better received – releases makes the Beach House iTunes Session EP a triumphant success." The EP's live renditions of "White Moon" and "Norway" were later released onto the band's compilation album B-Sides and Rarities (2017). In a press release about its inclusion of the album, the band stated that "White Moon" was recorded and "mixed very hastily" and remastered it to "better match [their] current aesthetics", while the remastered live rendition of "Norway" features a different bridge than the original.

== Track listing ==
All tracks are written by Beach House.

No.	Title	Length
1.	"Walk in the Park"	5:09
2.	"White Moon"	4:20
3.	"Norway"	3:18
4.	"Silver Soul"	4:40
5.	"Gila"	4:07
6.	"Real Love"	3:48
Total length:		25:22

== Personnel ==
Credits adapted from The Line of Best Fit and Apple Music.

Beach House

- Victoria Legrand – vocals, keyboard, production, mixing
- Alex Scally – guitar, backing vocals, bass pedals, production, mixing

Additional credits

- Daniel Franz – drums
- Chris Coady – production, mixing
