= B-Sides and Rarities (Beach House album) =

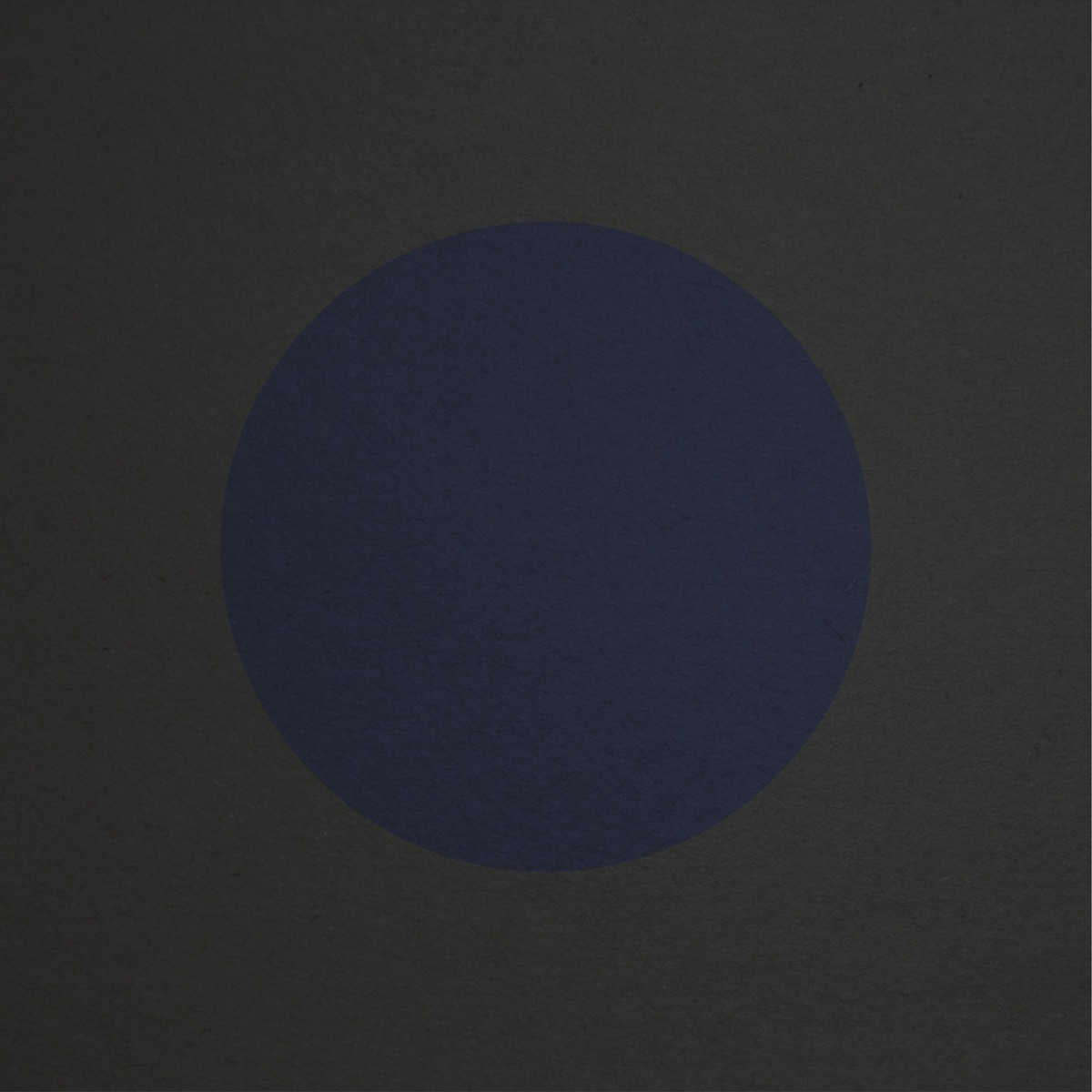

Compilation album by Beach House
- Released: June 30, 2017
- Recorded: 2005–2016
- Studios: Beach House's practice space (Baltimore); Lord Baltimore (Baltimore); Pan American (San Francisco); Dreamland (Hurley, New York); Magic Shop (New York City); Sonic Ranch (Tornillo, Texas); Studio in the Country (Bogalusa, Louisiana); Wright Way (Baltimore)
- Genres: Dream pop; indie rock
- Length: 56:27
- Label: Sub Pop
- Producers: Beach House; Chris Coady; Rob Girardi; Jason Quever

Beach House chronology
Thank Your Lucky Stars (2015)	B-Sides and Rarities (2017)	7 (2018)

Singles from B-Sides and Rarities
- 1. "Chariot" Released: May 17, 2017

B-Sides and Rarities is a compilation album by American dream pop duo Beach House, released on June 30, 2017, through Sub Pop in North America, Bella Union in Europe, and Mistletone Records in Australia. The compilation album features rare tracks from the duo that were initially difficult to find, now making them easily accessible for fans. The album's separate tracks feature production, though not collectively, from the duo themselves, Chris Coady, Rob Girardi and Jason Quever.

Following the release of their fifth and sixth studio albums Depression Cherry and Thank Your Lucky Stars, which were both released within a two-month period in 2015, the duo had thoughts on releasing B-Sides and Rarities once they had realized how many songs not included in any of their albums were recorded over the years, and how difficult it was to find any of them. They also explained that those specific songs did not fit into the context of their main albums, and were included onto B-Sides and Rarities to fit as a cohesive record and as "a final scrapbook of the last 12 years" of their career

B-Sides and Rarities contains several B-sides and rare songs released by the band, which were all written and recorded separately from 2005 to 2016, though listed in a non-chronological order. The album includes two previously unreleased tracks, "Chariot" and "Baseball Diamond", which were recorded during the recording sessions of Depression Cherry and Thank Your Lucky Stars (2015). It also features B-sides, re-mixed and alternate versions of original tracks, previously-hidden tracks, the non-album single "I Do Not Care for the Winter Sun" and a cover of Queen's "Play the Game".

"Chariot" was released as the lead single from B-Sides and Rarities on May 17, 2017, with the album being available for pre-order on the same day. An accompanying music video for the track was released on June 14. The album received generally favourable reviews from critics, and it peaked at number 137 on the US Billboard 200. The compilation album allowed the band to move forward with a new creative process, which was the development of their seventh studio album, 7 (2018).

== Background ==
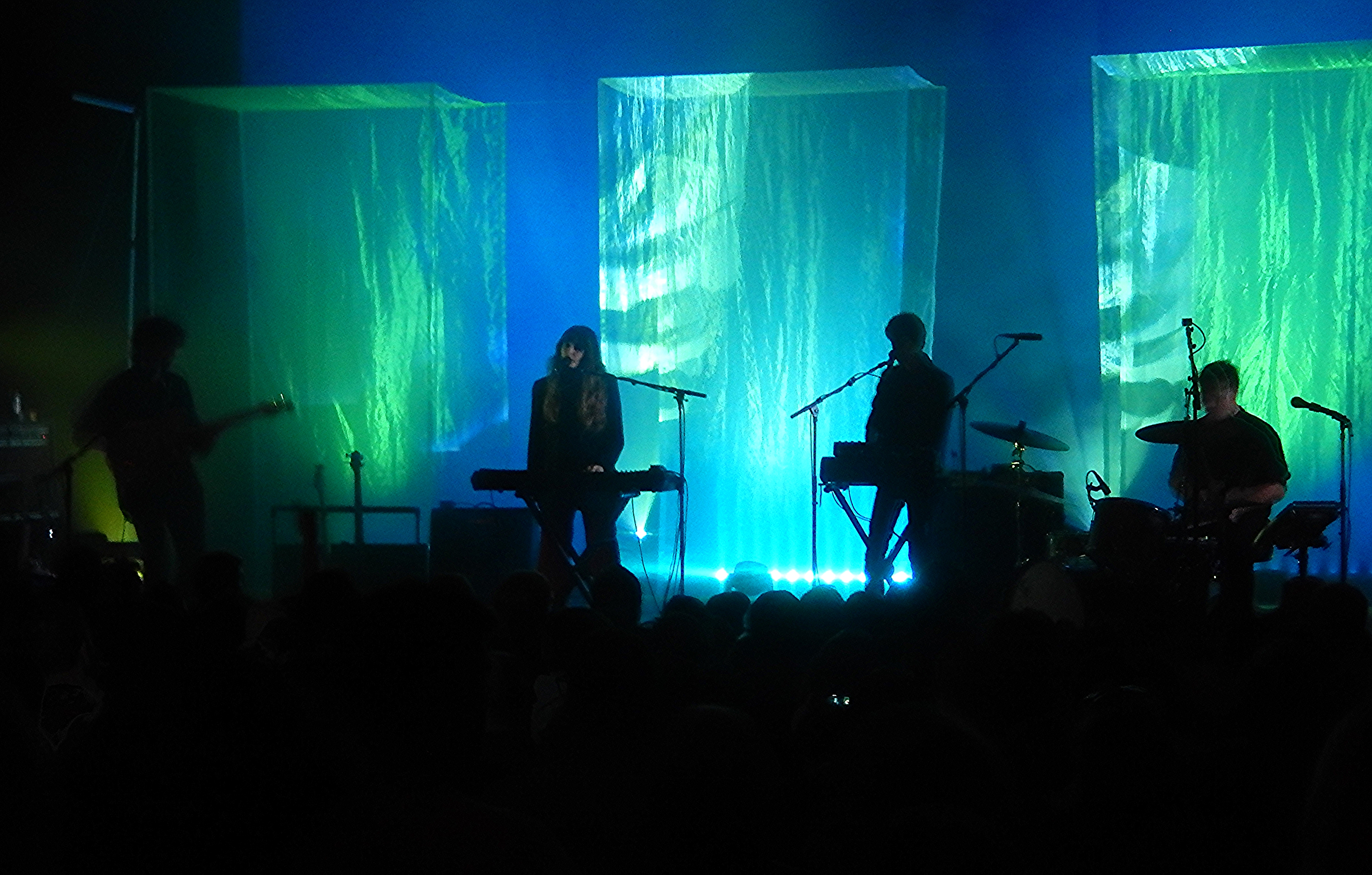
Beach House performing at the Depression Cherry tour in Milwaukee in September 2015.

On August 28, 2015, Beach House released their fifth studio album Depression Cherry, which marked the band's return to a simpler style of dream pop. The album debuted at number eight on the US Billboard 200, selling 27,000 copies in its first week, becoming their second top-10 entry on the chart. On October 7, 2015, about two months after its release, they announced their sixth studio album Thank Your Lucky Stars, which was stated to be a follow-up, but not a companion, to Depression Cherry or a "surprise or B-sides". That album debuted at number 39 on the Billboard 200 and at number four on the Top Rock Albums chart, with 10,000 copies sold in its first week.

In January 2017, the duo announced that they were putting together a collection of B-sides and rare cuts. In a press release, they explained that the idea of developing such a record came up when the band realized they had several recorded songs that have not been included in any of their studio albums, and how they were difficult to find. Guitarist Alex Scally further explained, in an interview with Under the Radar, that these certain tracks were included in this album to make them easily accessible for their listeners, critiquing how these tracks cannot be accessible "without being a YouTube super-fan". Initially, the duo thought that releasing this compilation seemed "natural" to them, however, they later admitted that doing this at around this period felt unusual.

In response to a comment by a user on Twitter, who said that the duo's "A-sides are like B-sides", they stated their goal was never creating any "explicitly" commercial music, adding that B-Sides and Rarities consists of tracks that did not fit in the context of their main albums, though only fit to make the compilation "a cohesive work". Lead vocalist Victoria Legrand stated that they saw this compilation album as "a final scrapbook of the last 12 years" of their career; they released it in order to move forward into "the future". Releasing this compilation album also allowed them to "clean the creative closet" to pave the way for a new creative process, which was the development of their seventh studio album, simply titled 7 (2018), in which they wanted to reassess their old recording methods.

== Content ==
B-Sides and Rarities is a compilation of 14 tracks, with 12 of them being previously released. Set in a non-chronological order, all of the songs from this compilation were separately recorded within a ten-year period, from 2005 to 2015, with some additions of live drums and remastering to tracks in 2016. The oldest recorded song on the compilation is "Rain in Numbers", a lo-fi track, which was recorded during the summer of 2005 when the band was formed. Initially appearing as the hidden track from their self-titled debut album, the duo used a friend's detuned piano and a four-track recording tape to record it, along with Legrand's vocals. "Used to Be" was originally released on October 21, 2008, as their first commercial single. After completing the writing of the track, they were "so excited" about it that they immediately began recording it so they could release it as a 7-inch single, in support of their fall tour with the Baltimore Round Robin. In that same session, they recorded their "fun and ridiculous" cover of British rock band Queen's "Play the Game". It was originally recorded for its inclusion on Dark Was the Night (2009), a compilation album benefiting AIDS research, but was pulled from the album by Queen's record label, who does not "do charity stuff". It was later released as the album's bonus track, though only as an iTunes-exclusive track.

Many of the songs on the compilation were written between 2009 and 2010. "10 Mile Stereo" (Cough Syrup Remix) was recorded in July 2009, during the Teen Dream recording sessions, in which they utilized a recording tape to slow down the original song, hence why they named it a "Cough Syrup Remix". They later wrote and recorded "Baby" in October 2009 with the band's friend Jason Quever, while "The Arrangement" and "White Moon" were both songs that the band did not believe conceptually fit on Teen Dream. The first three mentioned tracks during this period were initially released as the B-sides to their single "Zebra" (2010), which was released on April 17, 2010. The latter originally appeared on the band's live iTunes Session EP, stating that it was originally recorded "very hastily" and remixed it to suit their "current aesthetics". They also remixed and included the version of "Norway" they performed at that same session, with their main reason for its remixing being that it has "a very different bridge" than the original. "I Do Not Care for the Winter Sun" is a holiday song that the band released in 2010. It was written and recorded in 2010 while taking a break from touring after Beach House felt "incredibly grateful" to their fans, and was released for free on the internet, unmastered.

"Wherever You Go" was recorded between 2009 and 2011. The band stated that they "always loved" it, but thought it sounded similar to their previous works. They finished it during the Bloom recording sessions, which took place in 2011. Guitarist Alex Scally explained that they did not want the song to be part of the album and instead serves as "a wink at the end of [Bloom]", denoting its status as the album's hidden track. Another song written during the Bloom sessions was "Equal Mind", which was initially released as the B-side to the 7-inch single release for "Lazuli", the second single from Bloom. It did not appear on the album and was instead released as the B-side to "Lazuli" after realizing that it had instrumental similarities to "Other People", specifically its tempo, thus stating that it "did not fit" on the album. They had originally confirmed that the song would "never exist" in a digital format. The Bloom sessions also led to the creation of "Saturn Song", which was originally released in 2014 as the band's contribution to The Space Project, a compilation album by various artists, released through Lefse Records. This track contains sounds recorded in space and was based on a piano loop that the band wrote while recording Bloom. Previously unreleased, "Chariot" and "Baseball Diamond" were recorded a year later and were finished during the recording sessions for Depression Cherry and Thank Your Lucky Stars (2015).

== Release and reception ==
Professional ratings
Aggregate scores
Source	Rating
Metacritic	75/100
Review scores
Source	Rating
The 405	7/10
AllMusic	4/5 stars
Daily Express	4/5 stars
Dork	2/5 stars
Drowned in Sound	7/10
Paste	6.9/10
Pitchfork	6.9/10
PopMatters	7/10
Record Collector	4/5 stars
Under the Radar	6.5/10 stars

B-Sides and Rarities was made available for pre-order on May 17, 2017. On the same day, "Chariot" was released as the album's lead single, with an official music video being uploaded to the band's official YouTube channel on June 14. B-Sides and Rarities was released on June 30, 2017, through Sub Pop in North America, Bella Union in Europe, and Mistletone in Australia, on various formats including CD, LP, cassette and as a digital download. At Metacritic, which assigns a normalized rating out of 100 to reviews from critics, the album received an average score of 75, based on 9 reviews, indicating "generally favorable reviews". AllMusic said "B-Sides and Rarities points out the similarities and differences in Beach House's music over the years, even if its tracks aren't in chronological order," adding that it is "a collection that's lovely in its own right, and in its own way, is just as representative of Beach House's music as a traditional best-of would be." Daily Express called it the best album of the week, while stating that the songs "paint a fascinating picture of a band slowly building from the delicacy of earlier tracks." Drowned in Sound stated that "what the record lacks in atmosphere, it more than makes up for in discrete bursts of quality."

Pretty Much Amazing stated that Beach House "might be clearing the deck before a major label deal, or a shift in sound, or a next step in the band, but I have yet to hear a weak Beach House song, here's to hoping for seven more." Paste said "B-Sides and Rarities is a career-spanning collection, but Beach House's sound has remained so consistent that, without the band's extensive notes, it's nearly impossible to guess which songs stem from which era," further stating that: "There is nothing remotely bad on here, but there is also nothing that finds the duo lightening up or straying too far from the warm glow of their trademark sound. Nothing outlandish or self-indulgent or uncharacteristically loud." Under the Radar wrote: "this is the archetypical B-sides and rarities album. Thankfully, Beach House's B-sides are equivalent to most bands' A-sides, yet we are still left with a mixed bag," concluding that "ultimately, this B-sides and rarities album includes some intriguing material that will keep fans entertained until the next album, but most likely will have them returning to their favorite album tracks for a more satisfying fix." Pitchfork wrote: "It's a testament to the band's consistency that B-Sides and Rarities plays nearly as smoothly as a proper Beach House album, even though one of these tracks—scattered non-chronologically through an hourlong playtime—is more than a decade old."

== Track listing ==
All songs written by Victoria Legrand and Alex Scally, except where noted.

1. "Chariot" – 5:16
  - Previously unreleased song from the Depression Cherry and Thank Your Lucky Stars sessions (2015)
2. "Baby" – 3:02
  - B-side to "Zebra" (2010)
3. "Equal Mind" – 3:43
  - B-side to "Lazuli" (2012)
4. "Used to Be" (2008 Single Version) – 4:06
  - Single version of the song from Teen Dream (2010)
5. "White Moon" (iTunes Session Remix) – 4:07
  - Re-mixed live recording from iTunes Session EP (2010)
6. "Baseball Diamond" – 4:36
  - Previously unreleased song from the Depression Cherry and Thank Your Lucky Stars sessions (2015)
7. "Norway" (iTunes Session Remix) – 3:16
  - Re-mixed live version from iTunes Session EP of song from Teen Dream (2010)
8. "Play the Game" (Freddie Mercury) – 4:18
  - From Dark Was the Night (2009)
9. "The Arrangement" – 5:05
  - B-side to "Zebra" (2010)
10. "Saturn Song" – 4:31
  - From The Space Project (2014)
11. "Rain in Numbers" – 2:27
  - Hidden track from Beach House (2006)
12. "I Do Not Care for the Winter Sun" – 3:11
  - Non-album single from 2010
13. "10 Mile Stereo" (Cough Syrup Remix) – 5:31
  - Alternate version of the song from Teen Dream (2010), released as a b-side to "Zebra"
14. "Wherever You Go" – 3:27
  - Hidden track from Bloom (2012)

== Personnel ==
Credits adapted from the album's liner notes.

Beach House – all instrumentation (except where noted)

- Victoria Legrand
- Alex Scally

Additional musicians

- Daniel Franz – live drums (tracks 3, 5, 7, 9), live percussion (tracks 4, 8)
- James Barone – live drums (track 1)
- Jason Quever – live drums (track 2)
- Graham Hill – live drums (tracks 13)

Artwork

- Beach House – art direction
- Jeff Kleinsmith – art direction, design

Production

- Beach House – production (except track 11), mixing (tracks 6, 10, 12, 14)
- Chris Coady – production (tracks 1, 3, 5, 7, 9, 13), engineering (tracks 9, 13), mixing (tracks 1, 3, 6, 9, 13), remixing (tracks 5, 7)
- Rob Girardi – production (tracks 4, 8), engineering (track 4, 8), mixing (track 4)
- Jason Quever – production, engineering, mixing (track 2)
- Steven Wright – engineering (tracks 1, 5, 6)
- Brian Thorn – engineering (tracks 5, 7)
- David Tolomei – engineering (track 1)
- Manuel Calderon – engineering (track 3)
- Jay Wesley – engineering assistance (track 1)
- Heba Kadry – mastering (except track 13)
- Joe LaPorta – mastering (track 13)

== Charts ==
Chart (2017–2020)	Peak position
Belgian Albums (Ultratop Flanders)	159
Spanish Albums (Promusicae)	79
UK Independent Albums (Official Charts)	26
US Billboard 200	137
US Independent Albums (Billboard)	5
US Top Alternative Albums (Billboard)	17
US Top Rock Albums (Billboard)	27
