= Lazuli (song) =

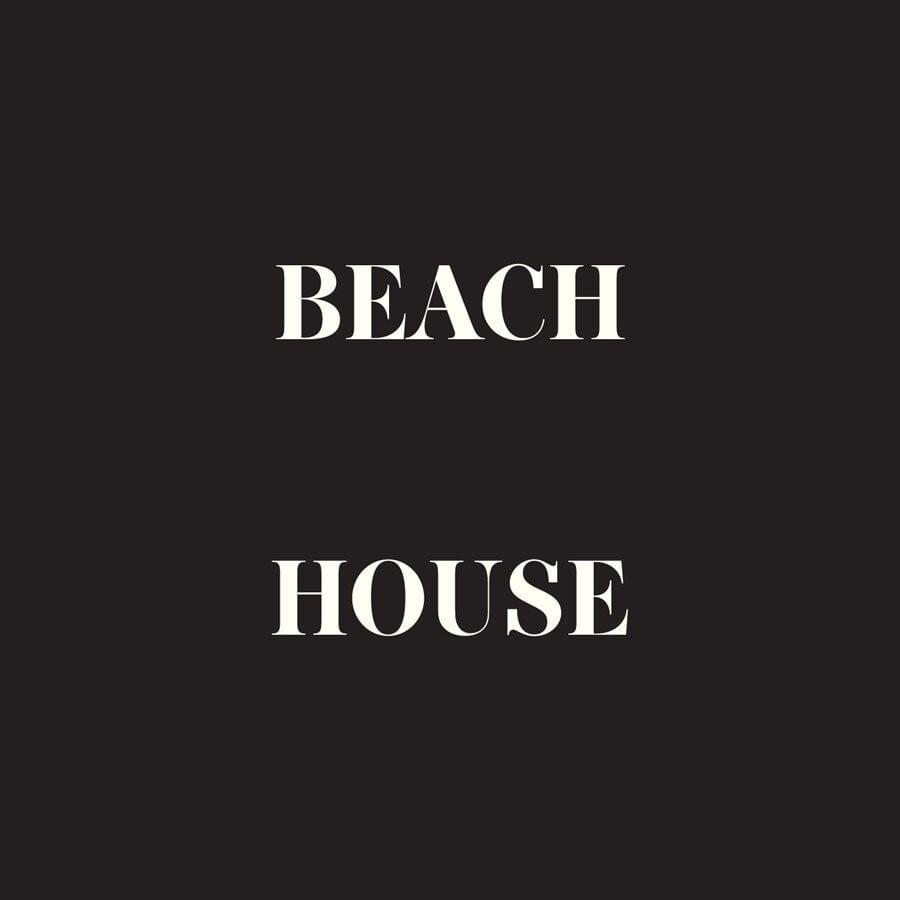
- Physical single cover

Single by Beach House

from the album Bloom
- B-side: "Equal Mind"
- Released: April 17, 2012
- Recorded: 2011
- Studio: Sonic Ranch (Tornillo, Texas)
- Genre: Dream pop
- Length: 5:02
- Label: Sub Pop
- Songwriters: Victoria Legrand; Alex Scally
- Producers: Chris Coady; Beach House

Beach House singles chronology
"Myth" (2012)	"Lazuli" (2012)	"Sparks" (2015)

Music video
- "Lazuli" on YouTube

"Lazuli" is a song by American dream pop duo Beach House. It was released on April 17, 2012, through Sub Pop, as the second single from the duo's fourth studio album Bloom (2012), later being released on April 21, Record Store Day, as a 7-inch single, featuring "Equal Mind" as its B-side. The song initially leaked four days earlier, on April 13. It succeeds the album's lead single, "Myth," which was released a month earlier and met with acclaim from critics.

Revolving around the metamorphic rock, lapis lazuli, lead vocalist Victoria Legrand stated that the song title had a sort of imagination and felt like it belonged in the "Beach House world." The song received positive reviews from music critics. They performed the song on Later... with Jools Holland on May 29, 2012. Its official music video, which was directed by Allen Cordell, was released on June 6, 2012. Its B-side, "Equal Mind," was later included on the band's compilation album B-Sides and Rarities (2017).

== Background and composition ==
On March 7, 2012, two years following the release of their third studio album Teen Dream (2010), Beach House released a song onto their website, "Myth", which would serve as the lead single for their fourth studio album Bloom, which they announced the next day and included "Lazuli" as the third track on the official tracklist. On March 20, 2012, the cover art for Bloom was officially revealed, with Sub Pop also announcing a Beach House single release for Record Store Day.

Titled after and lyrically revolving around the metamorphic rock, lapis lazuli, "Lazuli" begins with "twinkling" arpeggiated keys identical to ones produced by a Casiotone keyboard, as well as synth strings, and overlapping vocals and unified harmonies within the track's finale. While writing the song, Legrand said that the word "lazuli" seemed to have an insight, and also stated that she had always considered the word to be part of the "Beach House world."

=== "Equal Mind" ===
"Equal Mind", the B-side to "Lazuli" on the 7-inch single, was recorded during the Bloom sessions. The reason for its exclusion from Bloom was because the duo thought it had musical similarities to "Other People", its tempo in particular. They initially confirmed that the song would "never exist" in a digital format. This track, along with two other songs from the Bloom recording sessions ("Saturn Song" and "Wherever You Go"), would later be included in the duo's compilation album, B-Sides and Rarities (2017).

== Release and reception ==
On April 13, 2012, "Lazuli" was leaked Dutch radio station 3voor12's website, later being taken down shortly. It saw an official streaming release four days later, on April 17. It was later released on April 21, 2012, Record Store Day, as a 7-inch single, becoming the second single from the album, including "Equal Mind" as its B-side. The physical single was limited to a blue vinyl release of 2,400 copies. On May 29, 2012, they performed "Lazuli" on Later... with Jools Holland. The official music video for "Lazuli", which was directed by Allen Cordell, who also directed the video for "Walk in the Park", was released on June 6, 2012. On June 30, 2017, the duo released the compilation album B-Sides and Rarities, which included three tracks recorded during the Bloom sessions, with one of them being "Equal Mind", the B-side to "Lazuli".

"Lazuli" received positive reviews from music critics. Given the "Best New Track" accolade upon release, Jayson Greene of Pitchfork said that the song is "a forceful, overwhelming reminder of the world Beach House discovered on 2010's Teen Dream, one that hovers in the air, glowing and benevolent, like a giant Rothko painting". Upon its Record Store Day release, Craig Stevens of No Ripcord gave the song a 7 out of 10 rating and called the track "blissful and euphoric." Zachary Houle of PopMatters said that after beginning of the track, it "transforms itself into something from the Cure's Disintegration in its open and spacious sound that feels epic in rendering". Alex Denney of NME stated that the song's "effortless glide sounds a touch too much like 'Norway' off [Teen Dream], but still puts the screws on your heart with a gloriously twisty coda".

== Track listing ==
- 7-inch single
1. "Lazuli" – 5:02
2. "Equal Mind" – 3:43

== Personnel ==
Credits adapted from the liner notes of "Lazuli" and Bloom.

Beach House

- Victoria Legrand
- Alex Scally

Additional musicians

- Daniel Franz – live drums and percussion

Production

- Chris Coady – production, engineering, mixing
- Beach House – production
- Manuel Calderon – assistant engineering
- Brooks Harlan – engineering
- Phil Joly – assistant engineering
- Joe LaPorta – mastering

Artwork

- Brian Roettinger – design

== Charts ==
Chart performance for "Lazuli"
Chart (2012)	Peak position
Belgium (Ultratip Bubbling Under Flanders)	74
UK Physical Singles (OCC)	45
