= Zebra (Beach House song) =

- EP artwork

Single by Beach House

from the album Teen Dream
- B-side: The Arrangement; Baby; 10 Mile Stereo (Cough Syrup Remix)
- Released: April 17, 2010
- Recorded: July 2009
- Studio: Dreamland (Hurley, New York)
- Genre: Dream pop; indie rock
- Length: 4:49 (album version); 3:57 (UK radio edit)
- Label: Sub Pop; Bella Union
- Songwriters: Victoria Legrand; Alex Scally
- Producers: Beach House; Chris Coady

Beach House singles chronology
| "Norway" (2009) | "Zebra" (2010) | "Myth" (2012) |

Music video
- "Zebra" on YouTube

"Zebra" is a song by American dream pop duo Beach House. It was released as the second single off their third studio album, Teen Dream, on April 17, 2010, through Sub Pop. The song was written and produced by members Victoria Legrand and Alex Scally, with production also being handled by Chris Coady. Serving as the album's opening track, it features consistent guitar picking, vocal sighs and drum machine snares.

"Zebra" received positive reviews from music critics. It music video features an abstract array of colors that intensify as the song progresses. An EP that shares the same name was released as a Record Store Day exclusive; it features a UK radio edit of the song, along with new tracks "The Arrangement", "Baby" and a remix of "10 Mile Stereo". The latter three tracks were later released on their compilation album B-Sides and Rarities (2017).

== Background ==
In September 2009, following the release of their second studio album, Devotion (2008), it was announced that the duo had signed onto Sub Pop, marking their departure from Carpark. Along with this, it was confirmed that the duo were recording their third studio album. In October of that same year, the duo officially announced their third studio album, Teen Dream, and revealed its tracklist, where "Zebra" was the first track. With this record deal, they were able to produce a DVD version and hire a producer for the album, Chris Coady.

== Composition ==
For "Zebra", guitarist Alex Scally handled most of the song's arrangements. When vocalist Victoria Legrand first heard the song, she felt that "this was another brain looking in on what somebody else had created," and zebra imagery kept appearing in her mind, seeing "the patterns crossing". "Zebra" and the remainder of Teen Dream were recorded in July 2009 at Dreamland Studios, located in Hurley, New York. The song was altogether written and produced by the duo, along with co-production by Chris Coady.

Serving as the opening track from Teen Dream, "Zebra" commences with finger picks of an electric guitar, drum machine snares, and vocal sighs. The UK radio edit of the song omits the guitar-only intro, cutting about a minute from the original running time. As with the rest of the album, "Zebra" relies on live drums provided by Daniel Franz, featuring a climax after its first chorus and a pop crescendo. Critics from Cokemachineglow and PopMatters pointed out that the song's chord progression is similar to rock band Weezer's song "No Other One". Discussing this comparison in an interview with the former publication, Alex Scally stated that "Zebra" is done as a "4/4 waltz" and acknowledged that hearing a simple chord progression in a song symbolizes its many usages in various songs.

== Release and promotion ==
"Zebra" was first released as part of Beach House's third studio album Teen Dream on January 26, 2010, through Sub Pop. A day prior, Beach House performed the song on Late Night with Jimmy Fallon. On February 1, Beach House performed "Zebra" on their Daytrotter Session, along with other tracks from Teen Dream. Later that same month, they announced that they were releasing an EP of the same name as a Record Store Day exclusive on April 17, 2010. The EP features a UK radio edit of "Zebra" along with three new tracks: "The Arrangment", "Baby" and "10 Mile Stereo (Cough Syrup Remix)".

On the issue dated May 1, 2010, "Zebra" peaked at number 14 on the US Hot Singles Sales chart, while it peaked at 96 on the UK Physical Singles Chart on the issue dated May 9. On May 21, 2010, the official music video for "Zebra" was directed by Mark Brown and was uploaded to Sub Pop's YouTube channel. Previously released as part of its accompanying album's DVD version, the video features an abstract array of "reverberating" colors that intensify as the song proceeds.

== Critical reception ==
Consequence of Sound stated the song "grows and grows within the space it is given, and though we are not talking about the epic scale of, say, The Arcade Fire, they are not too far off either." The website also named it the ninth best song of 2010, with Winton Robbins complimenting Legrand's vocal performance and the duo's overall musicianship throughout. BBC said the song "slaloms to life on a loping, vertiginous riff that keeps sliding sideways when you think you know where it’s going. Over it, Legrand's vocals ooze like molasses before rising imperiously to deliver a swooning chorus hook-line, about the titular "black and white horse", that Bat for Lashes would kill for." Pretty Much Amazing said the song is "a gorgeous highlight" off its parent album. Zach Schonfeld of PopMatters said "Zebra" remains "one of Teen Dream’s most irresistible moments, buoyed by yearning vocal sighs and lyrics describing its eponymous "black and white horse arching among us". Impose Magazine said "the track elegantly blossoms into a gorgeous crescendo of oozy voices and crashing cymbals."

== Track listings ==
- Digital download
1. "Zebra" (UK Radio Edit) (3:57)
2. "The Arrangement" (5:03)
3. "Baby" (3:01)
4. "10 Mile Stereo" (Cough Syrup Remix) (5:28)
- US CD single
1. "Zebra" (UK Radio Edit) (3:57)
2. "The Arrangement" (5:03)
3. "Baby" (3:01)
4. "10 Mile Stereo" (Cough Syrup Remix) (5:28)
- 12" single

Side A

1. "Zebra" (UK Radio Edit) (3:57)
2. "The Arrangement" (5:03)

Side B

1. "Baby" (3:01)
2. "10 Mile Stereo" (Cough Syrup Remix) (5:28)

== Personnel ==
=== "Zebra" ===
Credits adapted from the liner notes of Teen Dream.

Beach House

- Victoria Legrand
- Alex Scally

Additional musicians

- Daniel Franz – drums, percussion

Production

- Chris Coady – production, engineering, mixing
- Beach House – production, arrangement
- Nilesh Patel – mastering

=== Extended play ===
Credits adapted from the liner notes of Zebra.

Beach House

- Victoria Legrand – vocals, keyboards, organ, bells
- Alex Scally – guitar, bass, organ, piano, background vocals

Additional musicians

- Daniel Franz – drums, percussion (tracks 1, 2, 4)
- Graham Hill – drums, percussion (tracks 1, 2, 4)
- Jason Quever – drums (track 3)

Production

- Chris Coady – production, engineering, mixing (tracks 1, 2, 4)
- Jason Quever – recording, mixing (track 3)
- Nilesh Patel – mastering

Artwork

- Jeff Kleinsmith – art direction, design

== Charts ==
Chart performance for "Zebra"
| Chart (2010) | Peak position |
|---|---|
| UK Physical Singles (OCC) | 96 |
| US Hot Singles Sales (Billboard) | 14 |
