= Silver Soul (song) =

2010 song by Beach House

Song by Beach House

from the album Teen Dream
- Released: January 26, 2010
- Recorded: July 2009
- Studio: Dreamland (Hurley, New York); DNA (New York City)
- Genre: Dream pop
- Length: 4:58
- Label: Sub Pop
- Songwriter: Victoria Legrand
- Producers: Beach House; Chris Coady

Music video
- "Silver Soul" on YouTube

"Silver Soul" is a song by American dream pop duo Beach House, serving as the second track off their third studio album, Teen Dream (2010). Lead singer Victoria Legrand wrote the song, attaining inspiration from a scene in Twin Peaks, while the duo have described the song to be about a "dark sexual being".

In the years following its release, the song had received positive commentary from music critics, with a few of them considering it one of the duo's best songs, and was sampled on songs by rappers Kendrick Lamar and Lil Peep. Legrand also directed its music video, included on the DVD version of Teen Dream, which features several silver-painted women hula-hooping. In 2025, the song received gold and silver certifications in the United States and the United Kingdom, respectively.

== Background and writing ==
In 2009, Beach House began working on their third studio album Teen Dream after extensive touring for their second album, Devotion (2008). Eventually signing a label contract with Sub Pop that same year, the entire album was leaked on the internet. It was later released officially on January 26, 2010, along with "Silver Soul", appearing as its second track. According to guitarist Alex Scally, one of the lyrics from "Silver Soul" was inspired by a scene in "Episode 14" of the television series Twin Peaks, where The Giant warns Dale Cooper, "it is happening again", which lead vocalist Victoria Legrand had remembered while writing the song. The song also features a "trailing" organ at the end of the song, which is used, on Teen Dream, to transition into the next track, "Norway".

== Release and reception ==
On December 1, 2009, "Silver Soul" was unofficially released on the internet and was taken down shortly per request of Sub Pop. It was later officially released on January 26, 2010, as the second track from the duo's third studio album Teen Dream. In 2013, "Silver Soul" was listed as Beach House's best song by John Everhart of Stereogum, while Max Savage Levenson from Paste named it their second-best song in 2015. The song was also sampled on rapper Kendrick Lamar's 2012 song "Money Trees". It was also sampled on rapper Lil Peep's 2016 track "Downtown", which later saw an official posthumous release to streaming services in 2025 through a sample clearance. On June 10, 2025, "Silver Soul" received a gold certification by the Recording Industry Association of America (RIAA), denoting a total of 500,000 units sold in the United States.

== Music video ==
A screenshot from the music video, directed by the band's lead vocalist Victoria Legrand, which depicts a group of silver-painted women hula-hooping, with one of them waving a flag.

The official music video for "Silver Soul" was first premiered on January 22, 2010, by music blog Gorilla vs. Bear, who also premiered four other music videos from the DVD version of Teen Dream earlier that week, with permission from the band and their label, Sub Pop. Directed by Victoria Legrand, the video solely consists of silver-painted women hula-hooping throughout the entire video. Brian Shultz of Punknews stated it "looks like Goldust's lair... with hula hoops". According to Legrand, inspiration for the video originated from a narrative she had imagined in her head while writing the song, subsequently explaining her visions and Scally's approval of such concept:

I saw this girl, I saw the hula hoops, I saw the silver, I saw the shower and the leg; it was one after another and I was just like, "What am I going to do? I have all these things in my brain?" So I talked about it with Alex and he supported the idea of me making the video, even though I had no experience. And I felt compelled to do it because the vision was so strong.

== Personnel ==
Credits adapted from the liner notes of Teen Dream.

Beach House

- Victoria Legrand
- Alex Scally

Additional musicians

- Daniel Franz – drums; percussion

Production

- Chris Coady – production, engineering, mixing
- Beach House – production; arrangement
- Nilesh Patel – mastering

== Certifications ==
Certifications for "Silver Soul"
Region	Certification	Certified units/sales
New Zealand (RMNZ)	Gold	15,000^{‡}
United Kingdom (BPI)	Silver	200,000^{‡}
United States (RIAA)	Gold	500,000^{‡}
^{‡} Sales+streaming figures based on certification alone.
