= Myth (song) =

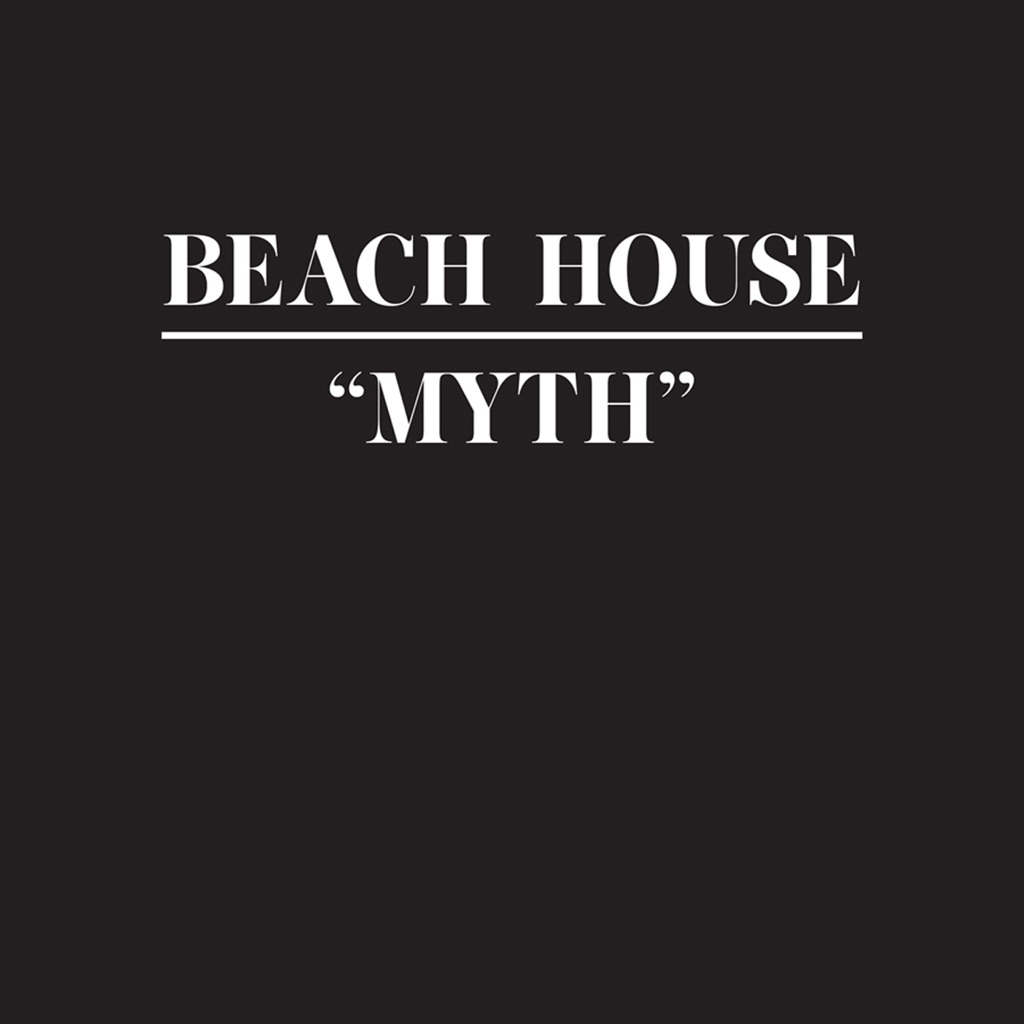

Single by Beach House

from the album Bloom
- Written: October 24, 2011
- Released: March 7, 2012
- Recorded: 2011
- Studio: Sonic Ranch (Tornillo, Texas)
- Genre: Dream pop
- Length: 4:18 (album version); 3:58 (radio edit)
- Label: Sub Pop
- Songwriters: Victoria Legrand; Alex Scally
- Producers: Beach House; Chris Coady

Beach House singles chronology
| "Zebra" (2010) | "Myth" (2012) | "Lazuli" (2012) |

Official audio
- "Myth" on YouTube

"Myth" is a song by American dream pop duo Beach House. The song was released on March 7, 2012, through Sub Pop, on the band's website, as the lead single for the band's fourth studio album, Bloom. The song was written and produced entirely by the duo, along with co-production from Chris Coady, and was recorded in 2011 at Sonic Ranch in Tornillo, Texas, as with the rest of its accompanying album.

A dream pop track, "Myth" received universal acclaim from music critics upon release, who considered it a fascinating evolution in their musical style; it was also considered as one of the duo's best songs to date and one of the best songs of the year. The song was also performed live on Late Show with David Letterman and Later... with Jools Holland. The song charted in Belgium, Mexico and the United Kingdom, and later received certifications in New Zealand and in the United States.

== Background and release ==
In 2009, Beach House began working on their third studio album, Teen Dream, when they eventually signed a label contract with Sub Pop, departing from Carpark Records, where they released their first two studio albums. Aside from the entire album being leaked on the internet that same year, it was released officially on January 26, 2010, through Sub Pop, garnering universal acclaim among several contemporary music critics. On March 7, 2012, the band released a new song on their website, titled "Myth," as a free download. The song was also posted onto the band's Twitter page. The next day, the duo officially announced their fourth studio album, Bloom, additionally confirming "Myth" as its lead single and opening track.

The song was also featured on the compilation album Terminal Sales, Vol. 5: Mixed Nuts, issued in 2012 as a Record Store Day-exclusive release. By May 2012, the song would have sold over 5,000 downloads. On May 19, 2012, Beach House performed "Myth" on Late Show with David Letterman. Three days later, on May 22, they performed it on Later... with Jools Holland. The song also appeared on international song charts, reaching a peak of number 41 on the Mexico Ingles Airplay chart, number 40 on the UK Independent Singles chart, and number 56 on the Ultratip Bubbling Under chart for Belgium's Flanders region. When asked if an official music video for "Myth" would be released, Beach House confirmed that they would not, adding that it is "hard to capture what the song conveys," and that it also leaves them unimpressed with the final results of such video.

== Composition ==
"Myth"
A 27-second sample of "Myth", which showcases its bridge which features a key change and "layers of echo" applied to Legrand's voice.

"Myth," was written on October 24, 2011. Like the rest of the tracks from Bloom, it was recorded within a seven-week period that same year at Sonic Ranch in Tornillo, Texas. It was additionally mixed at Electric Lady Studios in New York City. The song's title originated from the word "Myths" being written on Legrand's notebook, with nothing else written, with her additionally stating that the song "is a beautiful journey of what it takes to make something and to create something, and the vastness of that".

Serving as the opening track for Bloom, "Myth" runs at a length of four minutes and 18 seconds. A dream pop track, it begins with a simple cowbell beat, arpeggiated keys and a build-up of live drums, along with a bass synth that begins playing before Legrand starts singing about 45 seconds in. She sings in the song's first verse, "Drifting in and out, you see the road you're on". Halfway through the song, there is a key change and Legrand sings in the chorus, with layers of echo, "Found yourself in a new direction / arrows falling from the sun". Marc Hogan from Spin referred to the song's instrumental arrangements as an "amalgam of sinuous guitars, glistening synths, galloping drums, hazy reverb". Ace Ubas from Beats Per Minute described the song's outro to have used a "pedal combo of distortion and delay".

== Reception and legacy ==
Upon initial release, "Myth" received universal acclaim from contemporary music critics. An author from Billboard gave the song 4.5 out of 5 stars, stating that it is "the sonic equivalent of comfort food — a savory buffet spread of the musical trademarks the group has already perfected elsewhere". Ace Ubas from Beats Per Minute rated it a 9 out of 10, complimenting its instrumental arrangement and concluding with, "This is Beach House at their best and shows that they look to top Teen Dream". It was chosen upon release as "Best New Track" by Larry Fitzmaurice of Pitchfork, who called it "another sonic evolution for Beach House," elaborating this by complimenting its musical layers, Legrand's vocals and atmosphere. Upon its single release, Scott Shetler of Diffuser.fm gave the track an 8 out of 10 score, positively commenting, "With its dreamy atmospherics, 'Myth' isn't a huge departure for the Baltimore band, but in this case more of the same is a good thing."

Most critics found "Myth" to be a highlight track from Bloom. J. Pace of Under the Radar considered it "a powerful opener, instantly on par with Teen Dream's finest". Michell Eloy from Paste said that it "evokes a dream-like state with its simple, repetitive keystrokes and synth overlay", additionally "stand[ing] in contrast to Legrand's lyrics". Responding favourably, Alex Denney of NME said that it "retains the hi-def sparkle of [Teen Dream] without especially adding anything new". Somewhat less enthusiastic, Maddy Costa of The Guardian considered the song, along with "Other People", as a "conventional verse-chorus-middle-eight pop number[...]", which are "all more or less catchy".

"Myth" was named the eighth best song of 2012 by Brian Howe of Pitchfork, who considered it one of the band's "most powerful" songs to date. In 2019, before a live performance, Scally revealed that "Myth" was one of the duo's favorite songs ever released, stating that despite being written in 2011, they still perform it live because "it still vibrates in the 'right' way". On May 18, 2020, American musician Brandon Boyd, known as lead vocalist from Incubus, released an acoustic cover of the song, recorded "while in captivity". On October 21, 2026, "Myth" received a Platinum certification by the Recording Industry Association of America (RIAA), denoting a total of 1,000,000 units sold in the United States.

== Track listing ==
- UK CD single
1. "Myth" (radio edit) – 3:58
2. "Myth" (album version) – 4:18

== Personnel ==
Credits adapted from liner notes of Bloom.

Beach House

- Victoria Legrand
- Alex Scally

Additional musicians

- Daniel Franz – live drums and percussion

Production

- Chris Coady – production, engineering, mixing
- Beach House – production
- Manuel Calderon – assistant engineering
- Brooks Harlan – engineering
- Phil Joly – assistant engineering
- Joe LaPorta – mastering

== Charts ==
Chart performance for "Myth"
| Chart (2012) | Peak position |
|---|---|
| Belgium (Ultratip Bubbling Under Flanders) | 56 |
| Mexico Ingles Airplay (Billboard) | 41 |
| UK Indie (Official Charts) | 40 |

== Certifications ==
Certifications for "Myth"
| Region | Certification | Certified units/sales |
|---|---|---|
| New Zealand (RMNZ) | Gold | 15,000^{‡} |
| United States (RIAA) | Platinum | 1,000,000^{‡} |
^{‡} Sales+streaming figures based on certification alone.
