= Arrangement (disambiguation) =

In music, an arrangement is a reconceptualization of a previously composed work.

Arrangement may also refer to:

== Mathematics ==
- Arrangement (space partition), a partition of the space by a set of objects of a certain type
  - Arrangement of hyperplanes
  - Arrangement of lines
- Vertex arrangement, in geometry
- Arrangement as a permutation or partial permutation in combinatorics

== Social arrangements ==
- Marriage arrangement
- Sugar baby, a person who receives material benefits in exchange for company

== Other uses ==
- Flower arrangement
  - Korean flower arrangement
  - Ikebana, Japanese flower arrangement
- Sentence arrangement, the location of ideas and the placement of emphasis within a sentence
- Arrangements (album), a 2022 album by Preoccupations
- "Arrangement", a song by Childish Gambino from Royalty
- Sorting, any process of arranging items systematically

== See also ==
- Arraignment, part of the criminal law process in various jurisdictions
- The Arrangement (disambiguation)
