= Norway (song) =

2009 single by Beach House

Single by Beach House

from the album Teen Dream
- B-side: "Baby"
- Written: 2008 (Norway)
- Released: November 17, 2009
- Recorded: July 2009
- Studio: Dreamland (Hurley, New York); DNA (New York City)
- Genre: Dream pop; indie rock
- Length: 4:04 (single version); 3:54 (album version)
- Label: Sub Pop (US); Bella Union (UK)
- Songwriters: Victoria Legrand; Alex Scally
- Producers: Beach House; Chris Coady

Beach House singles chronology
"Used to Be" (2008)	"Norway" (2009)	"Zebra" (2010)

"Norway" is a song by American dream pop duo Beach House. The song was released on the band's website as a free download on November 17, 2009, as the lead single from their third studio album, Teen Dream (2010). A 7-inch single was later released in 2010, with "Baby" as its B-side. Along with the tracks from Teen Dream, "Norway" was recorded in July 2009 at Dreamland in Hurley, New York.

In 2008, "Norway" was written while on a train between the cities of Bergen and Oslo in Norway, in which the duo were asked by NRK Lydverket to write a song, based on their outside surroundings (including mountains) while in the train. The song received positive reviews from critics. It peaked at number 12 on the Mexico Ingles Airplay chart in 2010. An accompanying music video directed by Showbeast was released on the DVD version of Teen Dream in two versions.

== Background and writing ==
In September 2009, following the release of their second studio album, Devotion (2008), it was announced that the duo had signed onto independent record label Sub Pop, marking their departure from Carpark, along with a confirmation that the duo were recording their third studio album. In October of that same year, the duo officially announced their third studio album, Teen Dream. With this record deal, they were able to produce a DVD version and hire a producer for the album, Chris Coady.

The song was originally written while on a train between Bergen and Oslo, Norway in 2008. On their trip in Norway that year, they were asked by NRK Lydverket if a reporter could join them on their trip, and were asked to write a song on the train through the mountains. The song, as with the rest of its accompanying album, was recorded in July 2009 at Dreamland Studios in Hurley, New York. On the free-download version, "Norway" features a "trailing organ" at the start, which is a fragment of the preceding track on Teen Dream, "Silver Soul".

== Release and reception ==
On November 17, the band released "Norway", the lead single from Teen Dream, on their website as a free download. It received very positive reviews from contemporary music critics. The song was named upon release as "Best New Track" by Pitchfork, with reviewer Aaron Leitko stating that it "raises the temperature a few degrees" and is "radiant with the sunshiny 70s pop vibes." The song peaked at number 12 on the Billboard Mexico Ingles Airplay chart, being their highest-charting song on the chart. It also peaked at number 41 on the UK Physical Singles Chart, on the issue dated January 23, 2010.

== Music video ==
A screenshot from the music video, produced by Showbeast, depicting two live characters and three puppets near Mr. Westby.

Two versions of the accompanying music video for "Norway" were released on the DVD version of Teen Dream, with one video containing the track and the other one without it, serving as a short film (titled "Snorway"). The music video was directed by Alan Resnick, Benjamin Beast, and Erin Gleeson, collectively known for their web series Showbeast. A "comical, fantastical adventure" of puppetry, the video's storyline starts with a puppet's loud snoring, which inhales anyone nearby; three characters (one human and two puppets) are inhaled into their nose and ultimately enter into their dreams where they have a series of adventures, later being sneezed out.

Jennifer Kelly of Dusted Magazine referred it as the "oddest cut" from the DVD for Teen Dream, comparing it to the Muppets, "only not as funny and with stronger drugs, and it doesn’t add much to the song". Brian Shultz from Punknews thought it was "seemingly" inspired by The Chronicles of Namia. O'Brien revealed, in an interview with their brother Richard, that guitarist Alex Scally originally approached them and stated that the duo wanted a visual interpretation, though not a music video, of "Norway". He took inspiration from album-film pairing The Dark Side of the Rainbow, further elaborating the video's filming process,

Thinking we had to make a video based on a song without putting the song in it, we decided to get around this imaginary restriction I put on us by making our video sync up with the song when you played them at the same time (like when you play Dark Side of the Moon over The Wizard of Oz). It’s all very confusing, and was very confusing for us to make.

== Track listing ==
- 7-inch single
1. "Norway" – 4:03
2. "Baby" – 3:01

== Personnel ==
Credits adapted from the liner notes of "Norway" and Teen Dream.

Beach House

- Victoria Legrand
- Alex Scally

Additional musicians

- Daniel Franz – drums
- Graham Hill – percussion

Production

- Chris Coady – production, engineering, mixing
- Beach House – production, arrangement
- Nilesh Patel – mastering

Artwork

- Jason Nocito – photography
- Frank Hamilton – layout

== Charts ==
Chart performance for "Norway"
Chart (2010)	Peak position
Mexico Ingles Airplay (Billboard)	12
UK Physical Singles (OCC)	41
