= Used to Be (Beach House song) =

- Cover for the 2008 physical single

Single by Beach House

from the album Teen Dream
- B-side: "Apple Orchard (Virgin 4 Track Recording)"
- Released: October 21, 2008
- Recorded: July 2008; July 2009 (album version)
- Genre: Dream pop; indie rock
- Length: 4:05 (single version); 3:58 (album version)
- Label: Carpark; Sub Pop
- Songwriters: Victoria Legrand; Alex Scally
- Producers: Chris Coady; Beach House

Beach House singles chronology
"Used to Be" (2008)	"Norway" (2009)

"Used to Be" is a song by American dream pop duo Beach House. It was released as their debut single on October 21, 2008, through Carpark Records. A re-recorded version of the song was released on their third studio album, Teen Dream (2010). It was written by lead vocalist and keyboardist Victoria Legrand and guitarist Alex Scally and produced by them along with Chris Coady.

The 7-inch physical single of "Used to Be" also features a four-track recording demo version of "Apple Orchard", a song featured on their 2006 self-titled debut album, as its B-side. Upon its release on Teen Dream, the song was met with a positive critical reception, with some publications calling it a highlight track from the album. The single version of "Used to Be" released in 2008 was later included on the duo's compilation album B-Sides and Rarities, which was released on June 30, 2017.

== Background and recording ==
"Used to Be" was recorded by Rob Girardi in Baltimore in July 2008. The B-side "Apple Orchard" was recorded by the band in Baltimore in July 2005. The single features a front, back and inside cover arts, all three are Polaroids photographed by Legrand. The song is the first seven inch single released by the band. According to Carpark Records, the song was "recorded over the summer of 2008 after many exhaustive months of touring." The song contemplates the spiritual and physical effects of life on the ever-changing road, love and getting older. The B-side is a four-track demo version of "Apple Orchard", a song which featured on the band's self-titled debut, recorded three years to the month before "Used to Be". It is one of the first things Scally and Legrand recorded together as Beach House.

== Composition ==
Sputnikmusic described "Used to Be" as a "jazzy hop-step," as well as stating it is "easily the record’s most upbeat song." Consequence of Sound said the song doesn't "only open with the sound of the drum machine, but use speed increases of the percussion to move the songs past the down-tempo slow jams Beach House usually seem stuck on." PopMatters said the song is "a revelation at the album’s halfway point. Legrand sings along to the piano melody, and the mix surrounds the listener with multitracked vocals and percussion. Although the instruments are competing for space, the song does not feel overcrowded. The best development within the song is a drum shuffle that emerges from the quarter notes that have been steadily marking the tempo."

== Critical reception ==
Upon its single release, Justin Stewart of AllMusic described "Used to Be" as having an "even more of the lazy gait and sunrise-hazy atmosphere that [Beach House's] fans have come to expect." Regarding the Teen Dream version, Pretty Much Amazing called the song a "notable standout" off the album. American Songwriter said "Used to Be" is "a rollicking dreamboat; if ever there were a tune to listen to while coasting along in a Cadillac convertible, this is it." DIY said the song features "one of the loveliest fade-outs in recent memory." The 405 said the song "builds to a quiet crescendo of noise that is capped with some heartbreaking and mezmerising vocals," while also including it on the best "track to download" off the album along with "Norway." musicOMH said the track is given "extra dimensions with sonic architecture, intricate guitar picking, and Victoria Legrand’s surprisingly meaty vocals." Now Magazine says the songs effectively places "lyrical peaks into the slow-tempo slurry of basic backbeats and electronic clouds," while labeling it as the top track off the album. Sputnikmusic praised Legrand's vocal performance on the song, stating it is perhaps her strongest one.

== Music video ==
The music video for "Used to Be" was directed by Matt Amato. It was uploaded to Carpark Records' YouTube channel on November 19, 2008.

== Track listings ==
- Digital download
1. "Used to Be" (single version) (4:05)
2. "Apple Orchard" (Virgin 4 Track Recording) (4:06)
- UK CD single
1. "Used to Be" (single version) (3:57)
2. "Apple Orchard" (Virgin 4 Track Recording) (4:04)
- US 7" single

Side A

1. "Used to Be" (single version) (3:57)

Side B

1. "Apple Orchard" (Virgin 4 Track Recording) (4:04)

== Personnel ==
Beach House

- Beach House – production, composition, arrangement
- Alex Scally – guitar, bass, organ, piano, background vocals
- Victoria Legrand – vocals, keyboards, organ, bells

Additional

- Chris Coady – production, engineering, mixing
- Dan Franz – drums
- Graham Hill – percussion
- Alan Douches – mastering
- Rob Girardi – recording

== Charts ==
Chart performance for "Used to Be"
Chart (2008)	Peak position
UK Indie (Official Charts)	27
US Hot Singles Sales (Billboard)	13
