= Play the Game (song) =

1980 song by Queen

- UK single picture sleeve

Single by Queen

from the album The Game
- B-side: "A Human Body"
- Released: 30 May 1980 (UK); 6 June 1980 (US)
- Recorded: February–May 1980
- Studio: Musicland, Munich
- Genre: Progressive pop
- Length: 3:30 (album version); 3:12 (Queen Forever version)
- Label: EMI (UK); Elektra (US)
- Songwriter: Freddie Mercury
- Producer: Queen

Queen singles chronology
| "Save Me" (1980) | "Play the Game" (1980) | "Another One Bites the Dust" (1980) |

Music video
- "Play the Game" on YouTube

"Play the Game" is a song by British rock band Queen, written by Freddie Mercury. It is the first track on the first side of their 1980 album The Game. It also appears on their album Greatest Hits. The single was a hit in the UK, reaching No. 14 in the charts, and in the US, peaking at No. 42.

== Composition ==
The song commences with a series of overlapping rushing noises on an Oberheim OB-X synthesizer, heralding the band's acceptance of electronic instruments into their once explicitly "no synths" sonic repertoire. They played it in their live shows from 1980 to 1982.

The song features a soft vocal by Mercury, ending with a strong A4 rising in pitch all the way to C5 in chest voice (contrary to the other C5s being hit in falsetto). Mercury also played piano on the track.

Described by Classic Rock as a power ballad, Billboard considered "Play the Game" to be a return to Queen's traditional "epic, rather grand sound" after deviating from that sound with the rockabilly of their prior single "Crazy Little Thing Called Love". Cash Box similarly said that this was a return to Queen's "patented high tech, progressive pop sound" and they commented on "Freddie Mercury's breathless falsetto and sweet piano work" and "Brian May’s soaring lead guitar". Record World said that "Freddy Mercury leads a celestial choir of pretty falsettos juxtaposed with soaring guitars."

Later singles "It's a Hard Life", "Let Me Live" and "You Don't Fool Me" revisit the theme presented in "Play the Game", with Mercury writing from the same lover's perspective years later in the former song, and reflecting on the memories of the failed relationship in the latter. Both "Play the Game" and "It's a Hard Life" are of a similar structure, revolving around Mercury's piano playing and the band's multi-layered harmonies.

== Music video ==
The sleeve of the single, as well as its promotional video directed by Brian Grant, marked the first time Mercury appeared in either format with moustache. Brian May did not use his trademark Red Special guitar, instead using a Fender Stratocaster replica made by Satellite. This was likely due to the risk of damage involved in the shot in which Mercury snatches the guitar from May, then appears to throw it back to him which was played back in reverse so that it would be easier for May to play the solo after "catching" the guitar in the video. A shot of the band in the unedited blue screen set for the video was later used for the cover of the "Another One Bites the Dust" single release.

The video starts off with a shot of Outer space with shooting stars and microphones and then the Microphone stops in front of the screen and Freddie’s arm reaches out and grabs it and starts singing and the Outer space turns into Hell with flames behind him. Freddie is wearing his white Flash Gordon t-shirt. Roger Taylor can be seen behind him. each member of the band has different colour of flames behind them. Freddie Mercury in front of orange flames. Brian May in front of blue flames. John Deacon in front of green flames. Roger Taylor in front of purple flames. a portion of the video contains Freddie without his shirt with a sweaty appearance for a brief moment and after that his shirt is back and the fire turns back into outer space on he leaps onto the drum kit and tries to lift up the two small drums and he leaps down and grabs the guitar out of Brian‘s hands and tosses it back to him and Brian catches it and the fire comes back and stays until the video concludes.

== Personnel ==
- Freddie Mercury – lead and backing vocals, piano, synthesizer
- Brian May – guitars, backing vocals
- Roger Taylor – drums, backing vocals
- John Deacon – bass guitar

== Charts ==
| Country | Peak position |
|---|---|
| Belgium (Ultratop 50 Flanders) | 25 |
| Canada | 22 |
| France (IFOP) | 42 |
| Ireland (IRMA) | 9 |
| Netherlands (Dutch Top 40) | 15 |
| Netherlands (Single Top 100) | 10 |
| Norway (VG-lista) | 6 |
| Spain (AFYVE) | 21 |
| Switzerland (Schweizer Hitparade) | 8 |
| UK Singles (Official Charts) | 14 |
| US Billboard Hot 100 | 42 |
| US (Cash Box) | 38 |
| West Germany (GfK) | 40 |

== Beach House version ==
"Play the Game"

Song by Beach House

from the album Dark Was the Night and B-Sides and Rarities
- Released: June 30, 2017
- Recorded: July 2008
- Studio: Lord Baltimore (Baltimore, Maryland)
- Genre: Dream pop; indie rock
- Length: 4:18
- Label: Bella Union (UK); Sub Pop (US)
- Songwriter: Freddie Mercury
- Producers: Rob Girardi; Beach House

Music video
- "Play the Game" on YouTube

American dream pop duo Beach House recorded a cover of "Play the Game" that was released as an iTunes Store-only bonus track from Red Hot Organization's compilation album Dark Was the Night (2009). It was later included on their compilation album, B-Sides and Rarities (2017). It received positive reviews from critics.

=== Recording and release ===
Recorded in the same session as their 2008 single, "Used to Be", Beach House thought it would be "fun and ridiculous" to try covering "Play the Game", as fans of Queen's music. They also recorded it as their contribution to the Red Hot Organization's compilation album Dark Was the Night (2009), which benefited AIDS research, though Queen's record label prevented this release as they do not "do charity stuff", according to guitarist Alex Scally. It was later released as the compilation album's bonus track, though exclusively on the iTunes Store release. The track was later included on their compilation album B-Sides and Rarities (2017), released on 30 June 2017. The duo additionally stated that they would continue donating all profits earned from that song to the same charity.

=== Critical reception ===
Upon its initial release, Gorilla vs. Bear called it a "hazy and haunting cover". Ian Shirley of Record Collector likened Legrand's vocal performance to "wonderful Beach Boys harmonies".
