= Become (EP) =

EP by Beach House
- Released: April 22, 2023
- Recorded: May 2018 – July 2021
- Studios: Apple Orchard (Baltimore, Maryland); Pachyderm Studio (Cannon Falls, Minnesota); United Studio (Los Angeles); Village Recorders (Los Angeles)
- Genre: Dream pop
- Length: 24:27
- Label: Sub Pop
- Producer: Beach House

Beach House chronology
Once Twice Melody (2022)	Become (2023)

Become is an extended play by the American dream pop band Beach House. It was first released on April 22, 2023, as a Record Store Day exclusive, later being made available for music streaming platforms on April 28, followed by a release on CD and other formats on May 19. As stated by the band, the songs included in the EP were recorded during the recording sessions for their eighth studio album Once Twice Melody (2022), which took place from 2018 through 2021.

== Background and composition ==
On February 18, 2022, Beach House released their eighth studio album Once Twice Melody. A double album, it was released in four chapters starting November 2021. On February 16 of the following year, an announcement was made by the duo that they would be sharing five tracks from the Once Twice Melody recording sessions as a separate EP. The five tracks were recorded from May 2018 to July 2021, and were written, produced and performed entirely by the band. It was mastered by Greg Calbi and Steve Fallone at Sterling Sound.

The set of songs were described by the band as "[not fitting] in the world of [Once Twice Melody], but... a little world of their own", possessing a more "scuzzy" and "spacious" sound. Become's first track, "American Daughter", is an intensifying number that incorporates "crystalline" guitar arpeggios and a supporting "propulsive" rhythm. "Devil's Pool" features Victoria Legrand's "haunt[ing] and shimmer[ing]" vocals, with supported elements of Casio-like beats and string arrangements. "Holiday House" is baroque-like track made of "floaty" synthesizers. "Black Magic" is a "shimmering" track led by only a guitar, while the title track contains a continuous strummed guitar, compared to that of Radiohead's "Fake Plastic Trees".

== Release and reception ==
Professional ratings
Review scores
Source	Rating
Pitchfork	6.8/10

Become was first released on "crystal-clear" vinyl as a Record Store Day exclusive on April 22, 2023. It was later released onto music streaming platforms six days later, on April 28, by Sub Pop. The EP further saw a wider available release on physical formats including black vinyl, CD and cassette on May 19. On December 11, 2023, Beach House performed the EP's second track, "Devil's Pool", for the first time during their "stripped-down" show at Johnny Brenda's in Philadelphia.

In a favorable review, Marc Hogan of Pitchfork suggested that the EP is "sumptuous and starry enough to play alongside Once Twice Melody without dampening the mood", also stating that it is "pleasant but still feels like an afterthought".

== Track listing ==
All tracks are written by Beach House.

Become track listing
No.	Title	Length
1.	"American Daughter"	4:15
2.	"Devil's Pool"	4:00
3.	"Holiday House"	5:06
4.	"Black Magic"	5:08
5.	"Become"	5:58
Total length:		24:27

== Personnel ==
Credits adapted from the liner notes of Become.

Beach House

- Victoria Legrand
- Alex Scally
- James Barone

Production

- Nick Tveitbakk – engineering (tracks 2, 3, 5)
- Johnny Morgan – assistant engineering (tracks 1, 4)
- David Campbell – live strings arrangement (tracks 2, 5)
- Alan Moulder – mixing (track 1)
- Trevor Spencer – mixing (tracks 2, 3, 5)
- Caesar Edmunds – mixing (track 4)
- Greg Calbi – mastering
- Steve Fallone – mastering

Artwork

- Nicholas Law – album art
- Jeff Kleinsmith – art direction, design

== Charts ==
Chart performance for Become
Chart (2023)	Peak position
Scottish Albums (Official Charts)	79
UK Album Downloads (Official Charts)	40
UK Album Sales (OCC)	74
UK Independent Albums (Official Charts)	22
US Independent Albums (Billboard)	37
US Top Album Sales (Billboard)	24
