= The Arrangement =

The Arrangement(s) may refer to:

- The Arrangement (novel), a 1967 work by Elia Kazan
- The Arrangement (film), a 1969 film directed by Elia Kazan, adapted from his novel
- The Arrangement (2010 TV series), a reality series on Logo
- The Arrangement (2017 TV series), a drama television series on E!
- "The Arrangement", a song by Beach House from the 2017 album B-Sides and Rarities
- The Arrangements (short story), a 2016 short story by Chimamanda Ngozi Adichie
- The Arrangements (Mad Men), an episode of the TV series Mad Men
