= Das Oath =

Studio album by Das Oath
- Released: 16 August 2004
- Recorded: December 2003
- Genres: Thrashcore, hardcore punk
- Length: 27:00
- Label: Dim Mak Records
- Producer: Dennis Leydelmeier

Professional ratings
Review scores
Source	Rating
AllMusic	3.5/5 stars
PunkNews.org	4/5 stars

Das Oath is a full-length album by thrashcore band Das Oath, released in 2004 by Dim Mak Records. According to the album's liner notes, it was recorded in Rotterdam in the Netherlands.

Track 3, "Awesome Rape", was featured on the soundtrack to the skateboarding video game Tony Hawk's Underground 2.

== Track listing ==
All tracks are written by Das Oath.

No.	Title	Length
1.	"The Kult Starts (Some W) here"	1:17
2.	"Great News From the South Pole"	1:21
3.	"Awesome Rape"	1:30
4.	"Quiet!: Subtle Pretext Chiming In"	0:44
5.	"The Leaning Tower of Pisa Crap"	1:08
6.	"Blood Oranges"	1:26
7.	"Comatose Life of Wonderment"	1:36
8.	"The Great Anything"	1:20
9.	"Oh Gruesome Lunar Cycle"	1:39
10.	"Disney Surgery"	0:33
11.	"Get Out of Your Scene"	0:52
12.	"Nobody's Married Me in Years"	2:57
13.	"A Biggot is a Spic"	0:33
14.	"Harmonized"	1:15
15.	"The Virtue of Elitism"	2:04
16.	"[Untitled/Unlisted Hidden Track]" (Not listed in album booklet)	6:58

== Personnel ==
- Mark McCoy
- Jeroen Vrijhoef
- Marcel Wiebenga
- Nate Wilson
