= Teen Dream =

Studio album by Beach House
- Released: January 26, 2010
- Recorded: July 2009
- Studios: Dreamland (Hurley, New York); DNA (New York City)
- Genre: Dream pop
- Length: 48:40
- Labels: Sub Pop; Bella Union
- Producers: Chris Coady; Beach House

Beach House chronology
Devotion (2008)	Teen Dream (2010)	iTunes Session (2010)

Singles from Teen Dream
- 1. "Norway" Released: November 17, 2009; 2. "Zebra" Released: April 17, 2010

Teen Dream is the third studio album by American dream pop duo Beach House. It was released on January 26, 2010, through Sub Pop, being their first full-length release under the label following their departure from Carpark Records in 2009. Internationally, the album was released by Bella Union in Europe, Mistletone Records in Australia, and Arts & Crafts in Mexico. The album was produced and arranged by the duo, with Chris Coady as co-producer.

After Beach House finished touring in support of their previous studio album Devotion (2008), the duo began writing Teen Dream, which took about nine months. Recording sessions took place in July 2009 at Dreamland Studios in Hurley, New York and DNA in New York City. After it was announced that the duo signed to Sub Pop, they announced the album in October 2009, and released its lead single, "Norway", on November 17, 2009. Days after the single's release, Teen Dream was leaked onto the Internet. The album's second single, "Zebra", was released on Record Store Day, on April 17, 2010.

The album was met with critical acclaim from music critics, who praised the duo's change in sound and the album's instrumentals. It was also named as one of the best albums of 2010 by several publications. It debuted at number 43 on the US Billboard 200 with 13,000 copies sold within its first week of release, eventually selling a total of 137,000 copies in the United States by April 2012. In May 2012, they released the album's follow-up Bloom, which was met with similar acclaim.

== Background ==
Beach House released their self-titled debut studio album in October 2006, which was recorded on a four-track recording tape under a budget of approximately $1,000. It was met with a positive reception from music critics. They followed this with the release of their second studio album, Devotion (2008), which was announced in June 2007. That album became Beach House's first to appear on the US Billboard 200, debuting at number 195, selling roughly 3,000 copies within its first week. While touring in 2009, they stated that they were planning on recording new material during the upcoming summer. In September of that year, it was announced that the duo had signed onto independent record label Sub Pop, along with a confirmation that the duo were recording their third studio album. This would mark their departure from Carpark Records, where they released their first two albums. In October of that same year, the duo announced their third studio album, Teen Dream.

== Recording and visuals ==
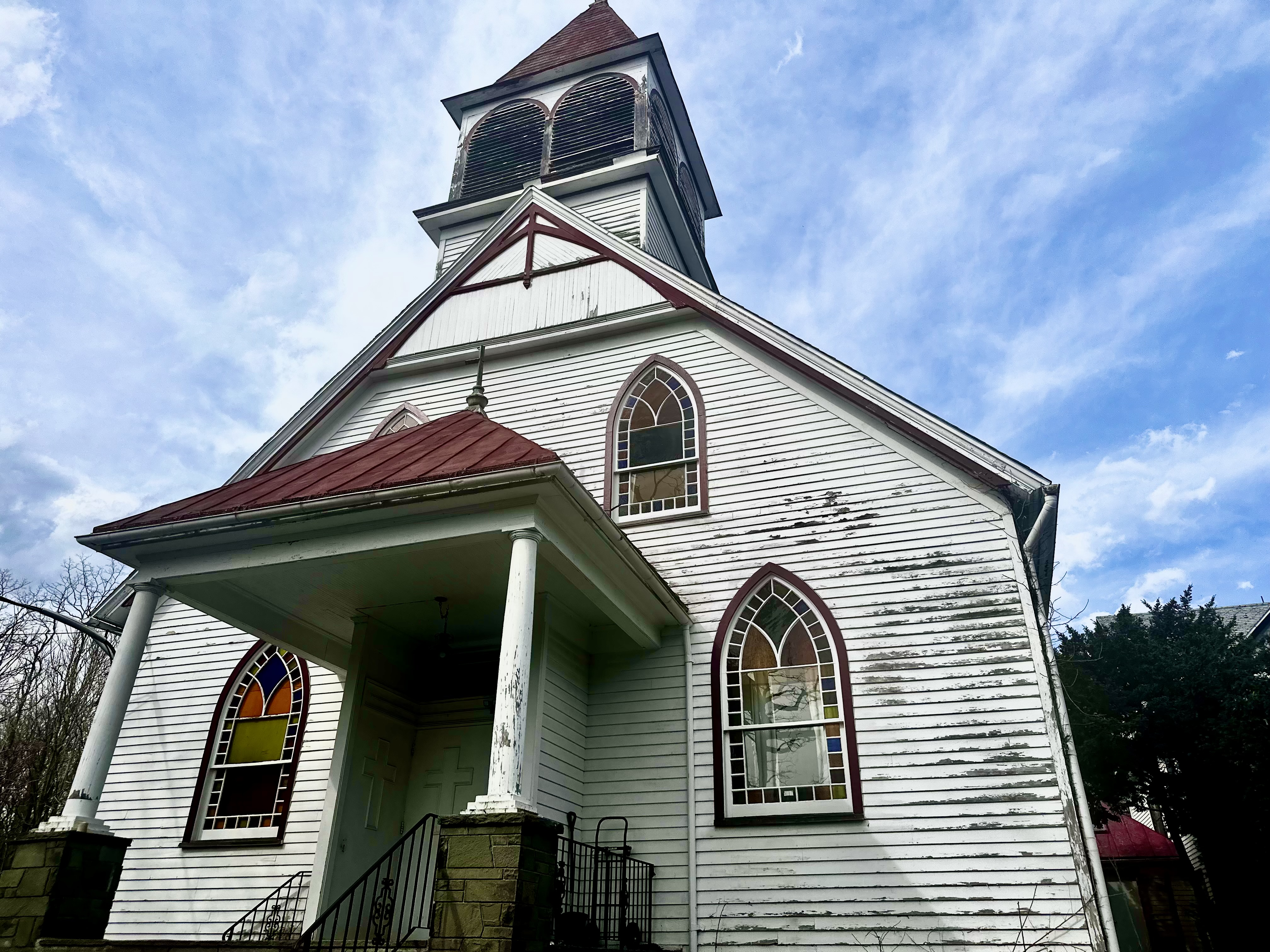
Teen Dream was recorded at Dreamland Recording Studios (pictured) during July 2009.

Unlike the writing process for Devotion (2008), where they wrote in between tour dates, the duo began writing songs for Teen Dream right after they finished touring, being done within nine months. Lead vocalist Victoria Legrand stated that while on tour, they preserved their energy and any concepts in mind for the album, additionally showing their excitement for once the touring cycle concludes. Most of the album's recording took place at Dreamland Studios in Hurley, New York, in a matter of three weeks in July 2009. Most of the instruments used on the album have also been used on Devotion. With the duo's record deal with Sub Pop, they were able to hire an outside producer for the album, Chris Coady.

Their record deal also allowed them to produce a DVD version of the album. This was conceptualized for a while, with Legrand stating that the album had a precise amount of energy for it to be done. In June 2009, a few demos were sent to video artists, in order to obtain accompanying music videos for the DVD. For "Norway", Guitarist Alex Scally had contacted Showbeast to create a visual interpretation of the song. Two videos for the track were released on the DVD; one version contained the track and the other one omits the usage of the track, also titled "Snorway". Scally had also stated that the album was considerably more expensive, stating that, "Every bit of money we got, we spent. The recording was insanely expensive. Every single step of the way, we've just tried to go more, go further".

== Musical style ==
Teen Dream has been described by publications as a dream pop and shoegaze album. According to Paul Lester of The Guardian, the album uses "simple elements – spectral piano, shimmery organ, steady percussion, pedal steel, and languorous female vocals". The duo strove to create a more "sophisticated" album and, according to the group, the demos of this record were comparable to the final tracks that made up their previous record. Also, their use of extensive reverb was held back significantly, according to Scally.

== Promotion and release ==
On November 17, 2009, "Norway" was released on the band's website as a free download, serving as the lead single from Teen Dream. A 7-inch single of it, which includes "Baby" as its B-side, was also released. The full album was leaked onto the Internet a few days after the release of "Norway". Teen Dream released on January 26, 2010, through Sub Pop. It was released internationally, through Bella Union in Europe, Mistletone Records in Australia, and Arts & Crafts in Mexico. The album was also released as a CD with an accompanying DVD featuring visualizers for each of the album's tracks.

Teen Dream debuted 43 on the US Billboard 200, selling 13,000 copies within its first week of release. By January 2011, it had sold 104,217 copies. It has sold a total of 137,000 copies as of April 2012, according to Nielsen Soundscan. On February 1, 2010, the band released their Daytrotter Session EP, which features live renditions of four songs from Teen Dream. A four-track EP for "Zebra", the album's third single, was released on April 17, 2010, as a Record Store Day exclusive. On August 24, 2010, the band released their six-track iTunes Session EP, featuring a new previously unreleased song, "White Moon", along with five renditions of songs from Teen Dream and "Gila".

=== Controversies ===
Legrand went on Twitter to address Katy Perry's album Teenage Dream, which was released later that year, for having a similar title as the band's album, writing they "can't believe this, and not in a good way" when linking to the Teenage Dream Wikipedia article. Fans of the band would post comments on Perry's Wikipedia page, with one writing, "Mrs. Perry's album title may or may not be ripping off the brilliant indie duo Beach House and their critically acclaimed record Teen Dream. It will be a challenge for her to achieve the same aural masterpiece," which would later be removed along with other comments.

In May 2012, the same month they released their fourth studio album and follow-up to Teen Dream, Bloom, a British advert created by DDB UK for automobile manufacturing company Volkswagen was published, which features a song that fans and publications thought was a rip-off of the band's song "Take Care". This specific track was known as "Whispers & Stories" by British group Sniffy Dog, who were a "music and sound design firm", and not a band or disc jockey. The band saw the advert and were strongly disappointed, but decided to avoid filing a lawsuit. They later responded on Facebook, stating that the advertising agency had attempted to license the song from them for a while, politely declining as they felt the song's aesthetic did not fit the advert's proposed concept. Kate Thompson, a representative for Volkswagen, also responded, respecting the band's artistry and stating that they did not intend to replicate a track of theirs or of someone else, though they were simply looking for a dream pop track. The band also stated that fans should not direct their comments to the company, but to the advertising agency instead.

== Critical reception ==
Professional ratings
Aggregate scores
Source	Rating
AnyDecentMusic?	7.8/10
Metacritic	82/100
Review scores
Source	Rating
AllMusic	5/5 stars
The A.V. Club	A−
Entertainment Weekly	A−
The Guardian	2/5 stars
The Irish Times	5/5 stars
NME	9/10
Pitchfork	9.0/10
Q	4/5 stars
Rolling Stone	3.5/5 stars
Spin	8/10

Teen Dream was met with critical acclaim upon release, with a majority of critics praising its "lush" production and lyrical content. At Metacritic, which assigns a normalized rating out of 100 to reviews from mainstream critics, the album received an average score of 82, based on 35 professional critic reviews, which indicates "universal acclaim". Aggregator AnyDecentMusic? gave it 7.8 out of 10, based on their assessment of the critical consensus.

Many reviews commented on the change in sound including BBC Music, who stated that "the most unmistakeable sound on Teen Dream is that of a band truly finding its own voice". Several publications focused on Victoria Legrand's vocals, with Jody Rosen of Rolling Stone complimenting Legrand's "dusky torch singing" and The Boston Phoenix praising her voice as "coiling like smoke in the arches of the church". Robert Christgau, writing in MSN Music, selected "Lover of Mine" and "Norway" as highlights and awarded the album an honorable mention rating. In a negative review, Tom Hughes of The Guardian felt that Teen Dream is "carefully, even beautifully arranged", but nonetheless "oddly icy and melodically a little ineffectual". Audra Schroeder of The Austin Chronicle called the album "solid" but felt that it was "not Beach House's masterpiece," quipping that the duo "still got some gold dust to kick up".

=== Accolades and legacy ===
Teen Dream was hailed as the best album of 2010 by Gorilla vs. Bear, who called it "the most elegant, visceral, sensual release of the year", and Spinner, who called it "a songwriting master class". Several publications named Teen Dream as one of the top 10 albums of the year; NME, Stereogum, and Under the Radar placed it at number three; Billboard, Clash, musicOMH, Pitchfork, and Prefix placed it at number five; Pretty Much Amazing placed it at number six; Consequence of Sound and PopMatters placed it at number seven; and Time placed it at number 10. NME included it in their 2013 edition of the 500 Greatest Albums of All Time. The album was also included in the 2014 edition of the book 1001 Albums You Must Hear Before You Die. In October 2019, Pitchfork ranked it in the 21st position among the best albums of the 2010s.

The album's earned widespread acclaim also helped the band grow their fan base, with Jay-Z and Beyoncé being spotted at the band's Coachella 2010 set. In December 2010, album track "10 Mile Stereo" was used in a Guinness commercial that debuted in Ireland. The song "Take Care" was used for the soundtrack of the 2020 film Chemical Hearts, in the film and during the end credits. The song was also featured in the fourth season of the teen drama television series 13 Reasons Why. The song "Silver Soul" was sampled in Kendrick Lamar's song "Money Trees" from his 2012 album Good Kid, M.A.A.D. City.

Publication	Accolade	Year	Rank	Ref.
American Songwriter	Top 50 Albums Of 2010	2010	40	
Billboard	Top 10 Albums of 2010	2010	5	
Clash	Top 40 Albums of 2010	2010	5	
Consequence of Sound	The Top 100 Albums of 2010	2010	7	
DIY	50 Albums of the Year 2010	2010	20	
Gorilla vs. Bear	Top Albums of 2010	2010	1	
The Guardian	The 40 best albums of 2010	2010	11	
musicOMH	Top 50 Albums Of 2010	2010	5	
NME	75 Best Albums of 2010	2010	3	
NME	500 Greatest Albums of All Time	2013	203	
No Ripcord	Top 50 Albums of 2010	2010	14	
Paste	The 50 Best Albums of 2010	2010	24	
Pitchfork	Top 50 Albums of 2010	2010	5	
Pitchfork	The 100 Best Albums of the Decade So Far	2014	5	
Pitchfork	The 200 Best Albums of the 2010s	2019	21	
PopMatters	The 70 Best Albums of 2010	2010	7	
Q	Top 50 Albums of 2010	2010	13	
Rolling Stone	30 Best Albums of 2010	2010	17	
Slant Magazine	The 25 Best Albums of 2010	2010	15	
Spin	The 40 Best Albums of 2010	2010	17	
Spinner	30 Best Albums of 2010	2010	1	
Sputnikmusic	Top 50 Albums of 2010	2010	19	
Stereogum	Top 50 Albums Of 2010	2010	3	
Time	The Top 10 Everything of 2010	2010	10	
Tiny Mix Tapes	Favorite 50 Albums of 2010	2010	31	
Under the Radar	Top 50 Albums of 2010	2010	3	

== Track listing ==
All lyrics are written by Victoria Legrand, except "Used to Be" co-written by Alex Scally; all music is composed by Beach House.

No.	Title	Length
1.	"Zebra"	4:48
2.	"Silver Soul"	4:58
3.	"Norway"	3:54
4.	"Walk in the Park"	5:22
5.	"Used to Be"	3:58
6.	"Lover of Mine"	5:06
7.	"Better Times"	4:23
8.	"10 Mile Stereo"	5:03
9.	"Real Love"	5:20
10.	"Take Care"	5:48
Total length:		48:40

iTunes Store bonus tracks
No.	Title	Length
11.	"Norway" (single edit)	4:03
12.	"Baby"	3:01
Total length:		55:50

A special edition DVD package was released containing either a CD or vinyl and a DVD, featuring psychedelic visuals for each track from Teen Dream, produced by a separate director.

== Personnel ==
Credits adapted from the liner notes of Teen Dream.

Beach House

- Victoria Legrand – vocals, keyboards, organs, bells "from outer space"
- Alex Scally – guitar, basses, organs, piano, harmony vocals, four-track

Additional musicians

- Dan Franz – drums (tracks 1–7, 10), percussion (tracks 1, 2, 7)
- Graham Hill – drums (tracks 8, 9), percussion (tracks 3–6, 8, 9)

Production

- Chris Coady – production, engineering, mixing
- Beach House – production; arrangement
- Nilesh Patel – mastering

Artwork

- Beach House – art conception
- Dustin Summers – layout and cover design
- Frank Hamilton – lyric book and mirror photography
- Steve Bloom – back cover photography

== Charts ==
Chart performance
Chart (2010)	Peak position
Belgian Albums (Ultratop Flanders)	36
Belgian Alternative Albums (Ultratop Flanders)	19
Canadian Albums (Nielsen SoundScan)	87
Dutch Alternative Albums (Alternative Top 30)	14
Irish Albums (IRMA)	48
Norwegian Albums (VG-lista)	33
Swedish Albums (Sverigetopplistan)	39
UK Albums (Official Charts)	78
UK Independent Albums (Official Charts)	10
US Billboard 200	43
US Independent Albums (Billboard)	6
US Indie Store Album Sales (Billboard)	2
US Top Alternative Albums (Billboard)	6
US Top Rock Albums (Billboard)	9

== Certifications ==
Certifications for Teen Dream
Region	Certification	Certified units/sales
United Kingdom (BPI)	Silver	60,000^{‡}
United States (RIAA)	Gold	500,000^{‡}
^{‡} Sales+streaming figures based on certification alone.
