= Mistletone =

- Founded: 2006
- Founder: Ash Miles, Sophie Miles
- Genre: Indie rock; electronic; avant-pop; folk
- Country of origin: Australia
- Location: Melbourne
- Official website: www.mistletone.net

Mistletone is an Australian independent record label, tour promoter, booking agency and publicity company founded in 2006 by Ash and Sophie Miles, who are husband and wife.

== See also ==
- List of record labels
