= Devotion (Beach House album) =

Studio album by Beach House
- Released: February 26, 2008
- Recorded: August–September 2007
- Studio: Lord Baltimore (Baltimore, Maryland)
- Genres: Dream pop; lo-fi
- Length: 44:10
- Label: Carpark

Beach House chronology
Beach House (2006)	Devotion (2008)	Teen Dream (2010)

Devotion is the second studio album by American dream pop duo Beach House. It was released on February 26, 2008, through Carpark Records. Internationally, it was also released by Bella Union in Europe and Mistletone Records in Australia. Serving as the follow-up to their self-titled debut studio album, Beach House (2006), the album was written in the early months of 2007 and was recorded at Lord Baltimore through August and September of that year.

To promote Devotion, Beach House released music videos for "You Came to Me", "Heart of Chambers" and "Gila". They also went on tour with indie pop band Papercuts throughout 2008. The album was released to mostly positive reviews from music critics and became Beach House's first album to enter the Billboard 200 chart, debuting at number 195, selling roughly 3,000 copies upon its release. As of April 2012, Devotion has sold 49,000 copies in the United States according to Nielsen Soundscan.

== Background and recording ==
Beach House was formed in 2004, when vocalist Victoria Legrand met guitarist Alex Scally in Baltimore's indie rock scene. They gained recognition in August 2006, after their song "Apple Orchard" was featured on a Pitchfork MP3 mixtape, and the duo later released their self-titled debut album in October of that same year, which was recorded on a 4-track over a two-day period in Scally's basement. In June 2007, they revealed, in an interview with Pitchfork, that they were working on their second studio album, adding that they were again working with Rob Girardi at the Lord Baltimore Recording studio. In October of that year, they officially announced the album and its title as Devotion.

The duo began writing Devotion within the first half of 2007, starting the recording process in July 2007, with the usage of an old Yamaha keyboard that became the "main instrument of the band", according to lead vocalist Victoria Legrand. While recording the album, the duo recorded a few songs with working titles, including "Wedding Bell" and "A Monster", as well as a set that were worked on since their self-titled debut album. "Heart of Chambers" was written at a practice space near I-83 in Baltimore, after they got noise complaints from their neighbors while recording at Scally's house. The duo also recorded a Daniel Johnston cover of "Some Things Last a Long Time," which they tried to record all of its verses at some point but felt it sounded "excessive".

== Composition ==
Drowned in Sound said the album has "the sound of atrophied romance, obscure regrets and flickering confetti set to a shoegaze siren call that brought to mind the likes of Mazzy Star and Slowdive whilst gently asserting a hushed authority all of its own," further stating that the "funereal organ and sparse, chintzy beats remain, but the sound is more fleshed-out and vivid with harpsichord and lushly textured keys, Alex Scally's slide guitar in particular more languidly expressive than ever." Slant Magazine stated the duo are "the Gillian Welch and David Rawlings of folktronica, dream pop, or whatever", adding that the album is "mostly quiet strumming, jangling percussion, and busy, elegiac keyboards."

According to AllMusic, "You Came to Me" is a "stunner, melding dark chamber pop ambience with lyrics that feel like they came from a surreal '70s AM radio hit." "Heart of Chambers" is "downright soulful, with Legrand's keening voice and swelling organs giving it a truly devotional cast". "Some Things Last a Long Time" is an "aptly torchy, country-tinged ballad about carrying a torch for someone". It is a cover of the Daniel Johnston song from his eleventh studio album, 1990. "Astronaut" "pines for a crush to be requited, filtering the innocence and drama of girl group pop through the band's gauzy approach."

== Promotion and release ==
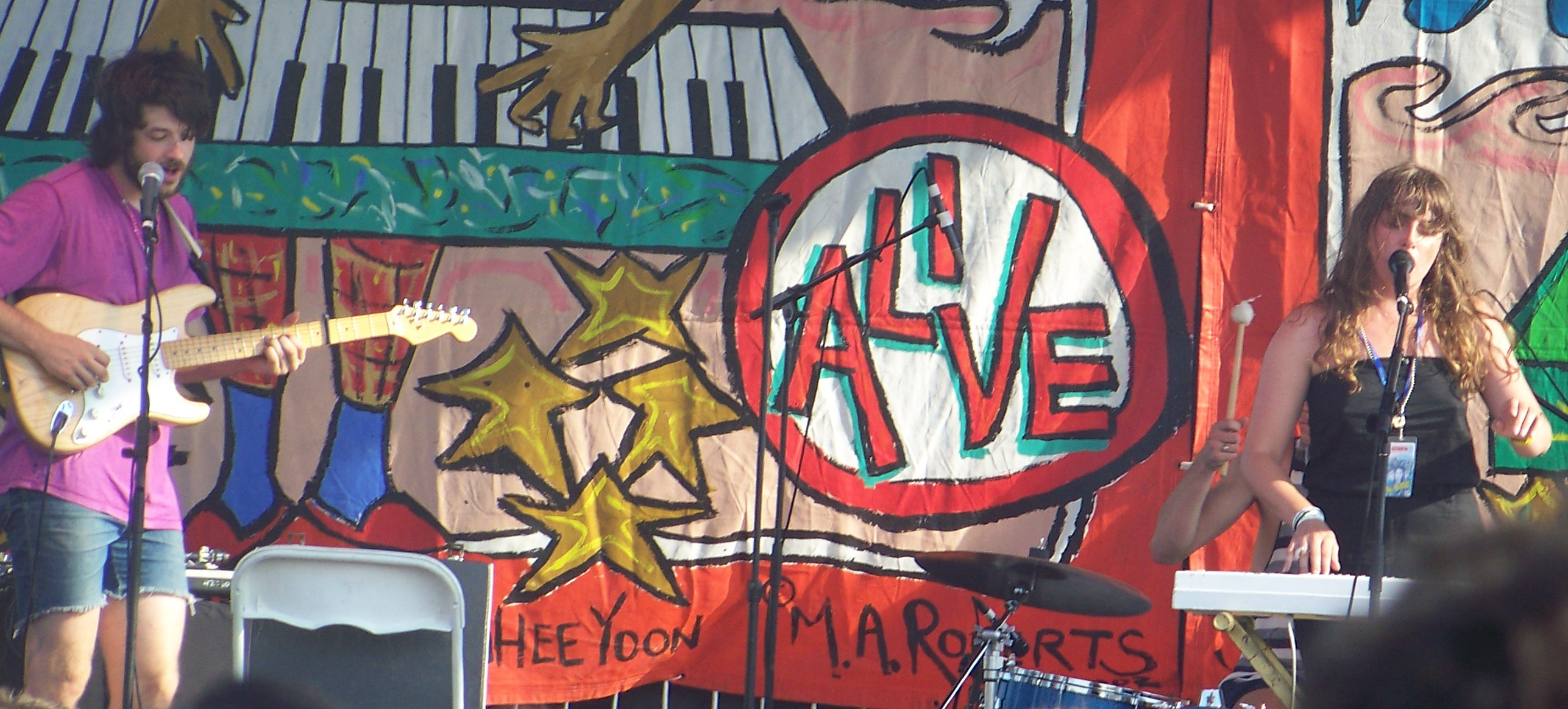
Beach House performing at Siren Music Festival in July 2008.

On February 13, 2008, the band released the music video for "You Came to Me", which was directed by Skyzz Cyzyk. Devotion was released on February 26, 2008, through Carpark Records. Two days later, on February 28, they released a music video for "Heart of Chambers" that was directed by Legrand's brother, Alistair Legrand. Devotion became Beach House's first album to enter the Billboard 200 chart, debuting at number 195 and selling roughly 3,000 copies within a week of release. On April 10, the band released a music video for "Gila", with direction from Jon Irone. Throughout 2008, the band toured with indie pop band Papercuts; Jason Quever of Papercuts also performed live drums on Beach House's sets during this period.

Regarding the album's title, Devotion, Legrand stated that it came from a lyric on "All the Years," another song recorded for the album, adding that while working on it that the word had been "sticking out a lot". She reflected on the title ten years after the album's release: "We called it Devotion for a reason. That was part of the story, and it’s part of our union. It felt like we were chasing something together. Two dreamers, together in a dreamworld." The album cover features both Scally and Legrand, who are sitting across from each other at a table with lit candles and a white cake with the album's title in blue icing. It was taken at the latter's apartment by Natasha Tylea. As of April 2012, Devotion has sold 49,000 copies in the United States according to Nielsen Soundscan.

== Critical reception ==
Professional ratings
Aggregate scores
Source	Rating
Metacritic	73/100
Review scores
Source	Rating
AllMusic	4/5 stars
The A.V. Club	B+
Entertainment Weekly	B
Mojo	3/5 stars
NME	7/10
Pitchfork	8.5/10
Q	3/5 stars
Rolling Stone	3.5/5 stars
Slant Magazine	4.5/5 stars
Spin	3.5/5 stars

Devotion received mostly positive reviews from music critics. At Metacritic, which assigns a normalized rating out of 100 to reviews from mainstream critics, the album received an average score of 73, based on 29 reviews, indicating "generally favorable reviews". Brian Howe of Pitchfork said "the duo's songwriting hasn't fundamentally changed on Devotion; they've simply cleaned up their act. These are crisper, brighter, bolder songs, retaining Beach House's sense of elegant decay while sweeping up the debris." Drowned in Sound said the album "resonates with the same formless essence as its predecessor, but also far exceeds it in both composition and execution," further stating that the band "have created as profound an invocation of the sacred and the sentimental as you’re ever likely to hear."

Slant Magazine praised the album, saying "it's possible to believe that if this band ever tires of killing with quietness and powerful beauty, they have it in them to dabble further in noise and space-rock. For now, though, holding back is working pretty damn well," as well as praising Legrand's vocal performance: "Where previously Legrand's vocals occasionally faltered or got lost in the mix of sped-up shoegaze, here she of the many Nico comparisons is comfortably out front. In fact, Legrand's vocal performance on Devotion is as masterful a one as you’re likely to hear in 2008." AllMusic stated the duo "bring more focus, depth, and warmth to their unmistakable sound" compared to their debut, as well as saying the band's "dark moods have more shades, and even a little bit of light, making them all the more compelling." With a positive review, Rolling Stone stated: "As comfortable as the Beach House sound is, it's the uncomfortable moments that are most seductive."

=== Accolades ===
Tiny Mix Tapes listed the album at number 6 on their top albums of 2008. No Ripcord ranked it at number 27, The A.V. Club at number 30 and Pitchfork at number 46. Rolling Stone included the album at number 36 in their "The 40 Greatest Stoner Albums" list, saying the album "was the perfect deep-toking soundtrack for late-'00s indie kids: a drifty, velveteen set full of homemade charm, gauzy keyboards and hypnotic tunes."

== Track listing ==
All lyrics are written by Victoria Legrand; all music is composed by Beach House, except "Some Things Last a Long Time" (lyrics by Jad Fair, music by Daniel Johnston).

No.	Title	Length
1.	"Wedding Bell"	3:55
2.	"You Came to Me"	4:05
3.	"Gila"	4:46
4.	"Turtle Island"	4:00
5.	"Holy Dances"	4:19
6.	"All the Years"	3:36
7.	"Heart of Chambers"	4:25
8.	"Some Things Last a Long Time"	2:32
9.	"Astronaut"	5:05
10.	"D.A.R.L.I.N.G."	3:18
11.	"Home Again"	4:09
Total length:		44:10

== Personnel ==
Credits adapted from the album's liner notes.

Beach House

- Victoria Legrand – keyboard, organ, vocals
- Alex Scally – guitar, drum, organ, four-track

Additional musicians

- Ben McConnell – drums (tracks 2, 9, 11), percussion (tracks 1, 2, 5, 6, 9, 11)
- Dave Andler – drums (track 10)
- Rob Girardi – Echoplex (track 11)

Production

- Rob Girardi – mixing, recording
- Adam Cooke – mixing, recording
- Alan Douches – mastering
- Natasha Tylea – photography

== Charts ==
Chart (2008)	Peak position
US Billboard 200	195
US Heatseekers Albums (Billboard)	5
