= Dreamland Recording Studios =

Recording studio in Hurley, New York

Coordinates: 41.9767°N 74.0887°W

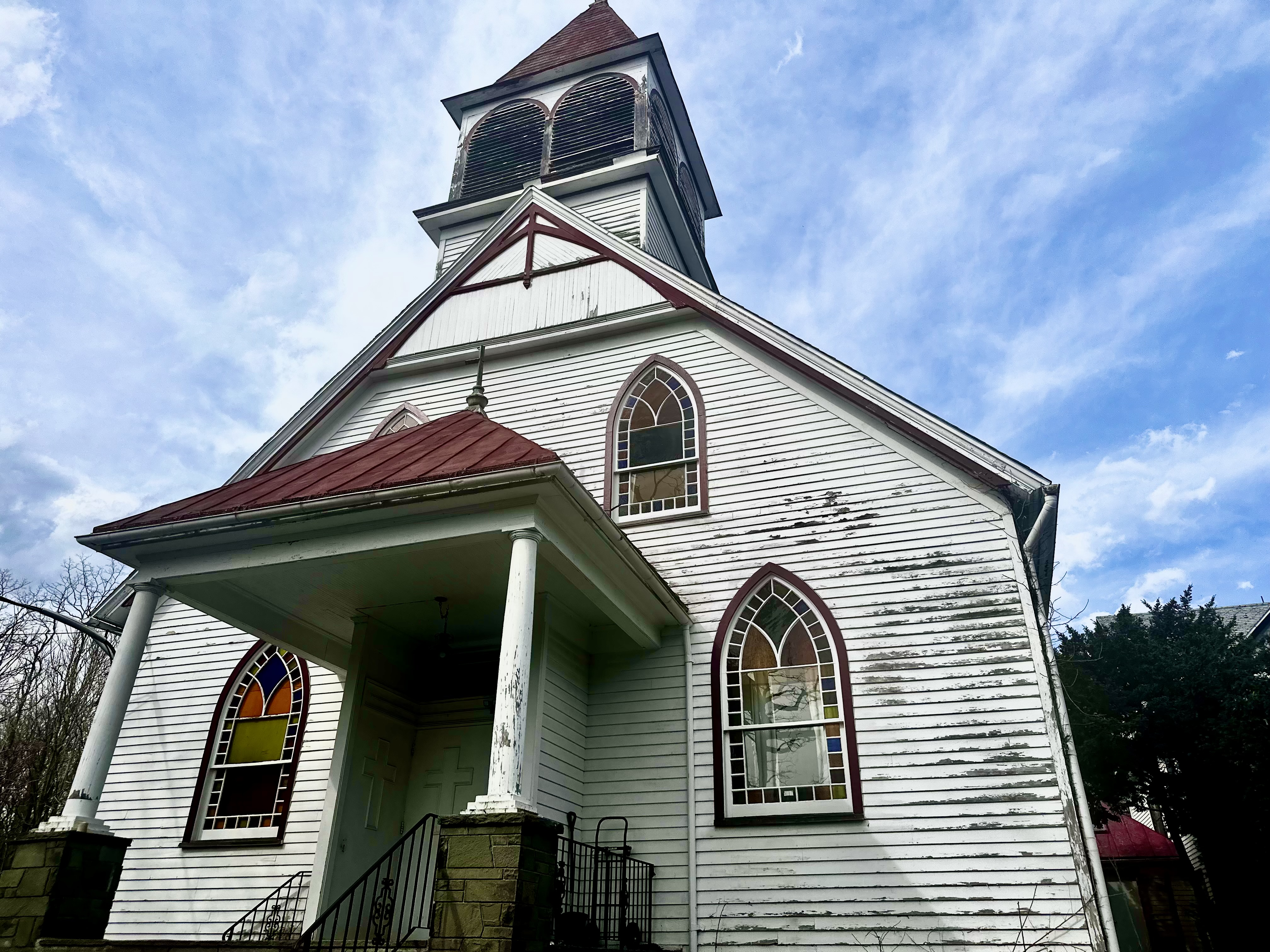
- Dreamland Recording Studios (2025)
- Industry: Recording studio
- Founded: 1986
- Founder: Joel Bluestein
- Headquarters: Hurley, New York
- Number of locations: 1
- Key people: Jerry Marotta

Dreamland Recording Studios is a residential recording studio located in the town of Hurley, New York, near Woodstock. Opened in 1986 as a recording facility, the studio is housed in what was once St. John's Church, built in 1896.

Artists who have recorded at Dreamland include the B-52's, Joan Jett, Ace Frehley, Misfits, Bad Brains, the Breeders, Nick Cave and the Bad Seeds, Fleet Foxes, Yo-Yo Ma and Bobby McFerrin, Suzanne Vega, Dinosaur Jr., Buffalo Tom, 10,000 Maniacs, Jack DeJohnette, Joe Jackson, the Mighty Mighty Bosstones, Sunny Day Real Estate, Lúnasa and the Connells among others, and more recently the National, Parquet Courts, Jack and Amanda Palmer, Beach House, and Kurt Vile.

== History ==
In 1983 Joel Bluestein bought the building, a former church originally built in 1896, and spent the next three years rebuilding it into a recording studio, opening Dreamland in 1986. The studio features a large 40' x 50' live room with 35-foot vaulted ceiling and four side rooms used as iso booths. All of the vintage recording gear and instruments that were used from the time of the studio foundation are still in use today, including a Steinway grand piano, Hammond B-3 organ, and Mellotron. The centerpiece of the control room is a 48-channel in-line API Legacy fit with Neve Flying Faders II originally built by Paul Wolff for Geoff Daking at Messina Music studio.

The studio has living facilities for long-term clients as well; the "Hamlet" is a five-bedroom cottage with two full bathrooms, a kitchen, and laundry facilities. There are also three bedrooms upstairs in the main building, a kitchen, and a rec room.

In 1989, the B-52's recorded several tracks for their 1989 album Cosmic Thing at Dreamland, including the hit single "Love Shack".

In 1991, Graham Parker recorded his album Struck by Lightning at the studio.

In 2003, amidst steeply declining revenues in the music industry, the studio was closed to commercial projects (with the exception of opening at Mick Guzauski's request for the Old 97's 2004 album, Drag It Up). In 2008, Dreamland was re-opened. Today, the studio is managed by drummer and composer Jerry Marotta.
