= Chris Coady =

American record producer and engineer

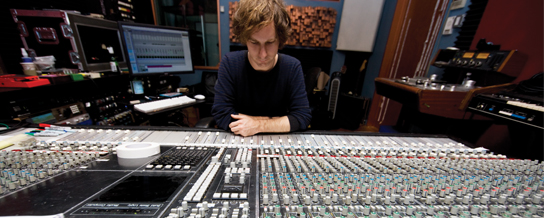
- Coady at DNA Downtown studios in New York City

Background information
- Occupation: Record producer

Chris Coady (born June 5, 1978) is an American record producer and mixing engineer. Born in Baltimore, Chris Coady is known for his work across several indie rock projects. After moving to New York in 2001 and teaming up with Dave Sitek at Stay Gold Studios in Williamsburg, he became a prominent engineer in the underground music scene.

Coady has worked with The Yeah Yeah Yeahs, tracking Show Your Bones and mastering Fever to Tell. He engineered Desperate Youth, Blood Thirsty Babes and Return to Cookie Mountain for TV on the Radio. His other credits include mixing Grizzly Bear’s Yellow House as well as producing and mixing Beach House’s albums from Teen Dream to Thank Your Lucky Stars.

In a career spanning two decades, Coady has worked on records from indie labels such as Sub Pop, 4AD, Warp, Fat Possum Records, Anti-, Downtown Records, Mom + Pop Music, Domino Recording Company, Dead Oceans, Atlantic Records and Concord Records. Reviewing Amen Dunes’ 2018 breakthrough Freedom, Spin called Coady “legendary”, his production having “the wallop and refinement of a globetrotting classic”.

’Mix With The Masters’ launched a series showcasing Coady's mix techniques. A 2022 Episode, recorded at the legendary EastWest Studios 3, highlighted the method behind Sasami’s ‘Make It Right’ He is currently working out of his own studio in a registered historic mid-century home in the foothills of the Los Angeles National Forest. Recent notable credits include Frog in Boiling Water by DIIV, Magic Hour by Surf Curse as well as Blondshell and Ekkstacy's self-titled albums.

== Discography ==
| Artist | Release | Record label | Role |
|---|---|---|---|
| Meltt | Pathways | Nettwerk Music Group | Mixer |
| DIIV | Frog in Boiling Water | Fantasy Records | Producer/Mixer |
| STRFKR | Parallel Realms | Polyvinyl Records | Producer/Mixer |
| Yung Lean ft. Bladee | Psykos | World Affairs | Mixer |
| Future Islands | People Who Aren't There Anymore | 4AD | Mixer |
| The Drums | Isolette | Anti Records | Producer/Mixer |
| Ultra Q | My Guardian Angel | Royal Mountain Records | Producer |
| Blondshell | Blondshell | Partisan Records | Mixer |
| Islands | And That's Why Dolphins Lost Their Legs | ELF Records | Producer/Mixer |
| Bunny Lowe | Baby Teeth | | Mixer |
| Sarah Crean | Death By Laundry | Awal | Mixer |
| Kevin Kaarl | Per Que No Me Comprendes | | Producer/Mixer |
| Blondshell | Joiner | Partisan Records | Mixer |
| Surf Curse | Magic Hour | Atlantic Records | Producer/Mixer |
| Ekkstacy | EKKSTACY | UnitedMasters | Mixer |
| Ekkstacy ft. Trippie Redd | problems | UnitedMasters | Mixer |
| Georgia Gets By | Fish Bird Baby Boy | Luminelle Records | Mixer |
| Sasami | Squeeze | Domino Records | Mixer |
| Widowspeak | The Jacket | | Mixer |
| Local Natives | ICYMI:CSLMI | Concord Records | Producer |
| Deserta | Every Moment, Everything You Need | Felte | Engineer |
| SRSQ | Ever Crashing | Dais Records | Producer/Mixer |
| Methyl Ethel | Are You Haunted? | Future Classics | Producer |
| Ian Sweet | Show Me How You Disappear | Polyvinyl Records | Mixer |
| Islands | Islomania | Royal Mountain Records | Producer/Mixer |
| Hand Habits | Fun House | Saddle Creek | Mixer |
| Together Pangea | Dye | Nettwerk Music Group | Mixer |
| Lael Neale | Acquinted With Night | Sub Pop Records | Mastering |
| I Break Horses | Warnings | Bella Union | Mixer |
| TOPS | I Feel Alive | Fantasy Records | Mixer |
| Foals | Collected Reworks | Warner Records | Engineer |
| San Cisco | Between You and Me | Nettwerk Music Group | Mixer |
| Cheerleader | Almost Forever | Bright Antenna Records | Producer/Mixer |
| The Bright Light Social Hour | Jude, Vol.1 | Modern Outsider Records | Producer/Mixer/Engineer |
| The Twilight Sad | It Won't Be Like This All The Time | Rock Action Records | Mixer |
| Show Me the Body | Dog Whistle | Loma Vista Records | Producer/Mixer/Engineer |
| Mozes and the Firstborns | Dadcore | | Producer/Mixer |
| Roosevelt | Young Romance | City Slang Records | Mixer |
| SRSQ | Unreality | Dais Records | Engineer |
| Porches | The House | Domino Records | Mixer |
| Mass Gothic | I've Tortured You Long Enough | Sub Pop Records | Mixer |
| Amen Dunes | Freedom | Sacred Bones Records | Producer/Engineer |
| Toothless | The Pace of the Passing | Rostrum Records | Mixer |
| TOPS | Sugar At the Gate | | Mixer |
| Together Pangea | Bulls and Roosters | Nettwerk Music Group | Mixer |
| Beach House | B-Sides and Rarities | Sub Pop Records | Producer/Mixer/Engineer |
| Roosevelt | Roosevelt | City Slang Records | Mixer |
| Springtime Carnivore | Midnight Room | Autumn Tone Records | Producer/Mixer/Engineer |
| Mass Gothic | Mass Gothic | Sub Pop Records | Mixer |
| Haley Bonar | Impossible Dream | Gndwire Records | Mixer |
| DIANA | Familiar Touch | Culvert Music | Mixer |
| TOY | Clear Shot | Heavenly Recordings | Mixer |
| The Future Sugar | Rey Pila | Cult Records | Producer/Mixer/Engineer |
| The Bright Light Social Hour | Jude Vol. II | Escondido Sound | Producer/Mixer |
| The Bright Light Social Hour | Jude Vol. I | Modern Outsider | Producer/Mixer |
| Amen Dunes | Freedom | Sacred Bones | Producer/Engineer |
| Slowdive | Slowdive | Dead Oceans | Mixer |
| We Are Scientists | Helter Seltzer | 100% Records | Mixer |
| Porches | Pool | Domino | Mixer |
| !!! | As If | Warp Records | Mixer |
| Beach House | Thank Your Lucky Stars | Sub Pop | Producer/Mixer |
| Beach House | Depression Cherry | Sub Pop | Producer/Mixer |
| Lower Dens | Escape from Evil | Ribbon Music | Mixer |
| The Bright Light Social Hour | Space Is Still the Place | Frenchkiss | Mixer |
| Tobias Jesso Jr. | Goon | True Panther Sounds | Mixer |
| Hooray For Earth | Racy | Dovecote | Producer/Mixer |
| The Antlers | Familiars | Anti | Mixer |
| The Orwells | Disgraceland | Canvasback/Atlantic | Producer/Mixer |
| Future Islands | Singles | 4AD | Producer/Mixer |
| We Are Scientists | TV en francais | Masterswan | Producer/Mixer |
| We Are Scientists | Business Casual - EP | Masterswan | Producer/Mixer |
| Yuck | Glow & Behold | Fat Possum | Producer/Mixer |
| Smith Westerns | Soft Will | Mom+Pop | Producer/Mixer |
| Beach House | Bloom | Sub Pop | Producer/Mixer/Engineer |
| Wavves | Afraid of Heights | Mom + Pop / Warner Brothers | Additional Production |
| Santigold | Master of My Make Believe | Downtown | Engineer |
| Smith Westerns | Dye It Blonde | Fat Possum | Produce/Mix |
| Cold Cave | Cherish the Light Years | Matador | Produce/Mix |
| Zola Jesus | “Poor Animal” | Sacred Bones | Produce/Mix |
| Gang Gang Dance | Eye Contact | 4AD | Engineer |
| Deadbeat Darling | Belle Epoch | Safety in Numbers | Producer |
| Delorean | Subiza | True Panther/Matador | Mix |
| Yeah Yeah Yeahs | iTunes Original Session | N/A | Engineer/Mix |
| Beach House | Teen Dream | Sub Pop | Producer/Mix/Engineer |
| Islands | Vapours | Anti- | Producer/Mixer |
| Dappled Cities | Zounds | Dangerbird | Producer/Mixer |
| ...And You Will Know Us by the Trail of Dead | The Century of Self | Justice | Producer/Mixer |
| Emma Daumas | Le Chemin de La Maison | Universal France | Mixer |
| Marissa Nadler | Little Hells | Kemado | Producer/Mixer |
| Soft | Forthcoming | Fabtone | Produce/Engineer |
| TV on the Radio | Dear Science | Interscope | Engineer |
| Lemonade | Lemonade | True Panther | Producer/Mixer |
| Gang Gang Dance | Saint Dymphna | Social Registry | Engineer |
| We Are Scientists | Brain Thrust Mastery | Virgin Records | Engineer/Tracking |
| Telepathe | Dance Mother | Angular | Tracking/Mixer |
| Golden Animals | Free Your Mind | Happy Part | Producer/Mixer |
| Foals | Antidotes | Sub Pop | Tracking |
| Mason Proper | Olly Oxen Free | Dovecote | Mixer |
| Dragons of Zynth | Coronation Thieves | Gigantic | Mixer |
| Architecture in Helsinki | Heart it Races | Polyvinyl/V2 | Tracking/Mixing |
| Thank You | Terrible Two | Thrill Jockey | Producer/Mixer |
| Celebration | Modern Tribe | 4AD | Tracking/Mixing |
| Architecture In Helsinki | Places Like This | Polyvinyl/V2 | Tracking/Mixing |
| Blonde Redhead | 23 | 4AD | Tracking |
| Jana Hunter | There’s No Home | Gnomon Song | Mix |
| The Devastations | Yes, U | Beggars | Mix |
| Massive Attack | Weather Underground | Virgin | Selected Tracking |
| Gang Gang Dance | Rawwar | Social Registry | Tracking |
| Yeah Yeah Yeahs | Show Your Bones | Interscope | Tracking |
| Yeah Yeah Yeahs | Gold Lion/Let Me Know | Interscope | B-Side Mix |
| TV On The Radio | Return To Cookie Mountain | Interscope/4AD | Tracking/Mixing |
| TV On The Radio w/ David Bowie | Province | Interscope/4AD | Tracking/Mixing |
| Grizzly Bear | Yellow House | Warp | Mix |
| Das Oath | Das Oath | Dim Mak | Tracking |
| Soft Circle | Full Bloom | Eastern Development | Recording/Mixing |
| Celebration | Celebration | 4AD | Tracking/Mixing |
| Cass McCombs | Perfection | 4AD | Mix |
| Cass McCombs | Sacred Heart | 4AD | Mix |
| Entrance | Wandering Stranger | Ryko/Fat Possum | Tracking/Mix/Producer |
| Oxes | Oxes | Monitor | Mastering |
| Heartless Bastards | Stairs and Elevators | Ryko/Fat Possum | Tracking/Mixing |
| !!! | Louden Up Now | Touch and Go / Warp | Tracking |
| !!! | Pardon My Freedom | Touch and Go / Warp | Tracking |
| Entrance/Cat Power | Do The Romp | Fat Possum | Tracking/Mixing/Producer |
| TV On The Radio | Desperate Youth… | Touch and Go/4AD | Technical Engineering |
| TV On The Radio | New Health Rock | Touch and Go/4AD | Tracking/Mixing |
| Entrance | Honey Moan | Tigerstyle | Mixing/Mastering |
| Yeah Yeah Yeahs | Fever To Tell | Interscope | Selected Mastering |
| The Drums | Brutalism | ANTI- Records | Mixing |
| Rey Pila | The Future Sugar | Cult Records | Producer |
| Xeno & Oaklander | Par Avion | Ghostly International | Mixing |
| I Break Horses | Warnings | Bella Union | Mixing |
| I Mean Us | 24 Years Old of You | Believe Music | Mixing |
