= Victoria Legrand =

French-American musician (born 1981)

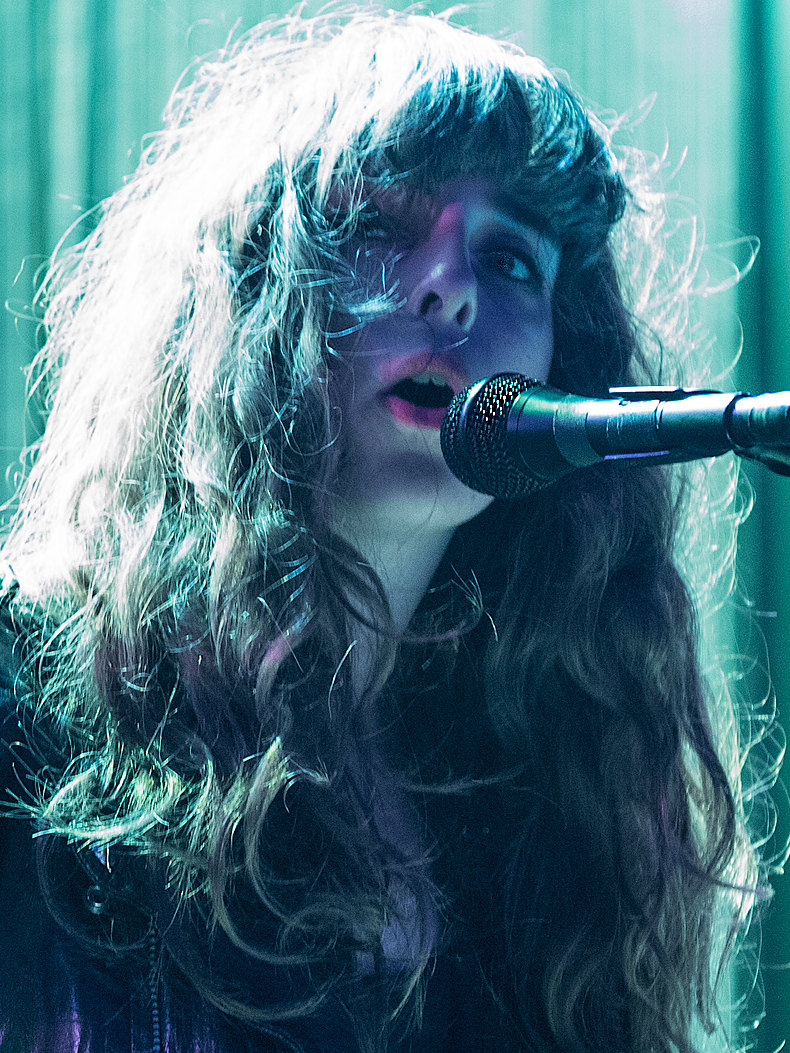
- Legrand performing in Oslo, 2013

Background information
- Born: Victoria Garance Alixe Legrand; May 28, 1981 (age 45); Paris, France
- Origin: Philadelphia, Pennsylvania, U.S.
- Genre: Dream pop
- Occupations: Singer; songwriter; musician
- Instruments: Vocals; keyboards; piano; guitar; bass
- Years active: 2004–present
- Member of: Beach House

Victoria Garance Alixe Legrand (born May 28, 1981) is a French-American musician, best known as the lead vocalist, songwriter and keyboardist of the dream pop band Beach House.

== Early life ==
Legrand was born on May 28, 1981, in Paris, France. She is the daughter of painter Olivier Legrand and niece of the French composer Michel Legrand and vocalist Christiane Legrand of The Swingle Singers. When she was six years old, she relocated with her family to the United States, where they resided in Baltimore and, later, rural Cecil County, Maryland. The family subsequently moved to Philadelphia, where Legrand spent her adolescent and teenage years. She is fluent in both French and English.

Legrand studied piano throughout her early life and adolescence, and, as a teenager, performed in a Led Zeppelin cover band. She graduated from the Shipley School in Bryn Mawr, Pennsylvania in 1999, and subsequently attended Vassar College, where she majored in drama. After graduating in 2003, she relocated to Paris to study acting at the International Theatre School of Jacques Lecoq. After becoming "disenchanted with theater school" and more interested in songwriting and in musical artists such as Le Tigre and Yo La Tengo, she dropped out of the program and returned to the United States, settling in Baltimore.

== Career ==
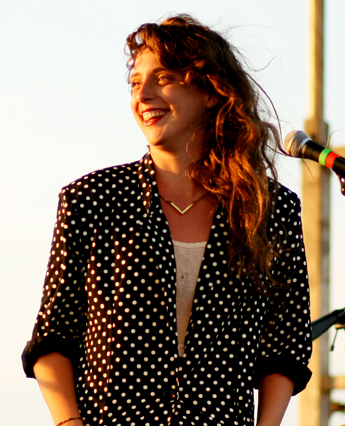
Legrand performing "Two Weeks" with Grizzly Bear at JellyNYC's Pool Party in August 2009

In 2004, Legrand met Baltimore native Alex Scally, through a mutual friend. At around this time, both were also part of a band called Daggerhearts, which would end up disbanding in late 2005 due to dysfunctionality. Wanting to form a new band feeling as though they both "grew out of [Daggerhearts]," they began writing music together, often spending time at Scally's house. Apart from writing music during this time, Legrand worked as a waitress at a Mexican restaurant in Baltimore and continued to do so until 2008. Legrand often mentions how organically they work together, and how in Scally, she found her "musical soulmate." Since the band's formation, they have released eight studio albums as part of their discography: Beach House (2006), Devotion (2008), Teen Dream (2010), Bloom (2012), Depression Cherry (2015), Thank Your Lucky Stars (2015), 7 (2018), and Once Twice Melody (2022); as well as an EP, Become (2023).

Aside from her work with Beach House, Legrand has also collaborated with indie rock band Grizzly Bear on various occasions; initially, Beach House were the openers for one of Grizzly Bear's shows in 2007. She also provided backing vocals on their song "Two Weeks", which they later performed together on The Tonight Show With Conan O'Brien in October 2009. She later collaborated with the band again by featuring on "Slow Life", the band's contribution to the soundtrack for the film Twilight: New Moon. Throughout 2013 and 2014, Daniel Rossen of Grizzly Bear joined Beach House, among several musicians, as part of the supergroup Gene Clark No Other Band, who live-covered American singer-songwriter Gene Clark's album No Other (1974) in its entirety. Beach House wanted to perform the entire album live in order to bring it to a new audience. In October 2025, Grizzly Bear announced their first tour dates since 2019, with Legrand joining them on most headline dates to "sing a few songs" with them.

== Musicianship ==
=== Vocal style ===
Legrand possesses a contralto vocal range. Some music outlets have compared her vocals to those of Nico, and Hope Sandoval's.

=== Songwriting and influences ===
Legrand and Scally write music anywhere between eight and 16 hours a day, and strive to create thoughtful music they feel strongly about. Legrand often emphasizes the honesty, thoughtfulness, and authenticity Beach House tries to get across in their music. Legrand laments the references to Beach House as being "wafty, wavy, floaty, dreamy," and insists on the band's loudness and all-encompassing soundscapes they create: "We are a loud band. OK, so it's not abrasive, but it's not soft."

Legrand has said in interviews that she wishes audiences would focus on the craft of their songwriting. She commented, "what you're feeling is the craft, that everything is there with intention," as opposed to the individual sounds that surround "the real meat of it all....There's a lot of great sounds in music, but it's not gonna necessarily make you feel something." She is protective of the identity of the band and cautiously chooses how they expose themselves to their audience.

She has remarked on her love of The Cure, the Cocteau Twins, and Gene Clark, and cited Courtney Love of Hole as an influence.

== Discography ==
=== Guest appearances ===
Title	Year	Other artist(s)	Album	Contribution
"Slow Life"	2009	Grizzly Bear	The Twilight Saga: New Moon (soundtrack)	Featured vocalist
"Two Weeks"	2009	Grizzly Bear	Veckatimest	Backing vocalist
"Seven Stars"	2011	Air	Le voyage dans la lune	Lyricist, featured vocalist
"Not Yet"	2022	None	For the Birds: The Birdsong Project, Vol. IV	Spoken word
