= Alex Scally =

American musical artist (born 1982)

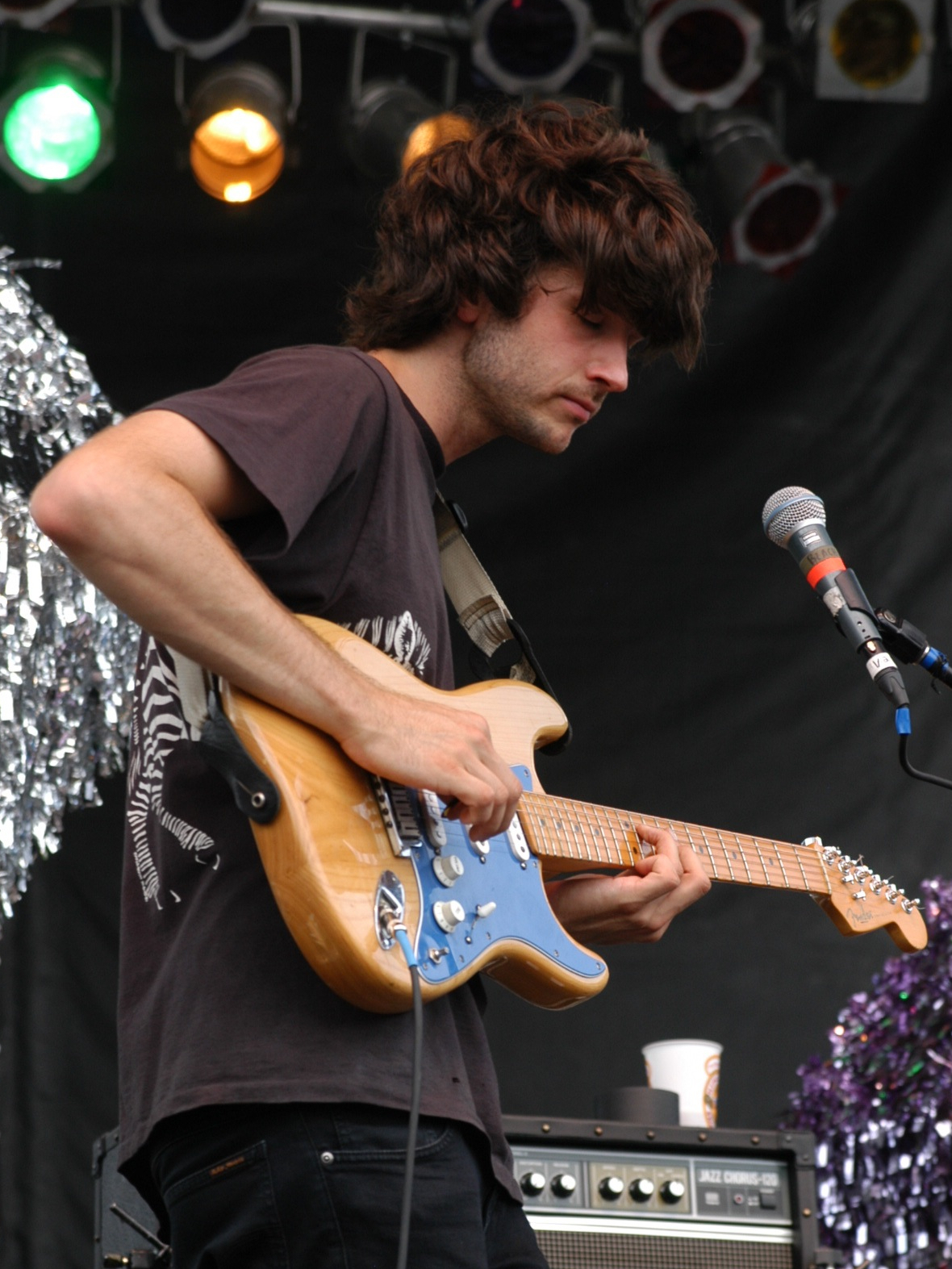
- Scally performing in 2010

Background information
- Born: Baltimore, Maryland, U.S.
- Genres: Dream pop; indie rock
- Instruments: Vocals; guitar; keyboards; bass; drum machine
- Years active: 2004–present
- Labels: Bella Union; Sub Pop; Carpark; Arts & Crafts México
- Member of: Beach House

Alex Kristian Scally is an American multi-instrumentalist and songwriter. He is known as the co-writer, guitarist and backing vocalist of the dream pop band Beach House, with whom he has recorded eight studio albums.

== Early life ==
Scally was born and raised in Baltimore, Maryland. He is of Irish Catholic heritage. He graduated from Baltimore Polytechnic Institute in 2000, and from Oberlin College in 2004, where he studied geology and ran NCAA Division III cross-country. Upon graduation, he returned to Baltimore to work as a carpenter alongside his father.

== Career ==
In 2004, Scally met Victoria Legrand in Baltimore through one of her friends; after meeting each other, Scally also joined her other band at the time, Daggerhearts. The band would end up disbanding in 2005, due to "dysfunctionality", so the two had decided to start another band, basing it in Baltimore as it was "a place where people can make music intensely, because you don't have to make much [money] to live [there]." After numerous hangouts and first writing sessions, both decided to name their band Beach House, which was named after their written song "House on the Hill". Recalling the formation of the band, Scally said: "We were both just kind of knocking around Baltimore right in our early 20s, and met doing a different musical project, and then [Beach House] kind of grew out of it."

Regarding Beach House's early shows, Scally noted: "I'm really glad nobody came to our shows at the start, because we had no idea what we were doing." Since their formation, Beach House has released eight studio albums as part of their discography: Beach House (2006), Devotion (2008), Teen Dream (2010), Bloom (2012), Depression Cherry (2015), Thank Your Lucky Stars (2015), 7 (2018), and their most recent full-length release, Once Twice Melody (2022). In 2013, the band had also formed a temporary supergroup, Gene Clark No Other Band, that toured only throughout 2013 and 2014. They have also provided soundtracking for other media, including the short films This Must Be the Only Fantasy (2013) and Marin's Dreams (2021).
