= Bloom (Beach House album) =

2012 studio album by Beach House

Studio album by Beach House
- Released: May 15, 2012
- Recorded: 2011
- Studios: Sonic Ranch (Tornillo, Texas); Magpie Cage (Baltimore)
- Genre: Dream pop
- Length: 60:27
- Label: Sub Pop
- Producers: Chris Coady; Beach House

Beach House chronology
| iTunes Session (2010) | Bloom (2012) | Depression Cherry (2015) |

Singles from Bloom
- 1. "Myth" Released: March 7, 2012; 2. "Lazuli" Released: April 17, 2012

Bloom is the fourth studio album by American dream pop duo Beach House. It was released on May 15, 2012, through Sub Pop in the United States. It was released internationally by Bella Union in Europe, Mistletone Records in Australia, and Arts & Crafts in Mexico. The entire album was arranged and performed by the duo, with Daniel Franz handling live drums and percussion, and lead vocalist Victoria Legrand handling the songwriting on all of the tracks. Alongside the duo, the album was produced by Chris Coady, who worked with them for the second time, following his contributions on their third studio album, Teen Dream (2010), which was widely regarded as their breakthrough album.

In March 2011, Beach House began writing Bloom as their main focus after touring for Teen Dream, with some songs being written years prior and while on tour. They recorded the album twice; they first composed demos at their practice space in Baltimore and they later began recording them in 2011 at Sonic Ranch in Tornillo, Texas, which took a period of nine weeks to accomplish. While recording, they relied on a 24-track analog tape to record the tracks and avoided the usage of the studio's instruments. They chose to record in Texas after being captivated in the area while resting at El Paso during a tour. Additional vocals were recorded at Magpie Cage in Baltimore and the album's mixing was handled at Electric Lady Studios in New York City, where it was first rumored that the band had completed the album in January 2012.

Musically, Bloom has been described by critics as a dream pop record, seeing the duo leaning away from their initial lo-fi and ambient music style found on their earlier studio albums, continuing to add live drums to their song arrangements and supplementing their drum machine rhythms. Several critics also noted a few shoegaze, indie pop and new wave influences within several tracks on the album, with the duo adding that material within the album has a darker sound than Teen Dream, with personal themes revolving around heartbreak, longing, death and lost love. The album was met with wide appraisal from contemporary music critics upon release, many whom complimented its instrumental arrangements, with some additionally considering it the duo's best album to date. It was named as one of the best albums of 2012 by several publications, including Consequence, Obscure Sound, Pitchfork, PopMatters and Under the Radar.

To promote Bloom, Beach House released its main singles "Myth" and "Lazuli", both which received critical acclaim upon their respective releases. It was also supported with a set of music videos, a supporting summer tour and an international fall tour, the latter being marketed as the Frightened Eyes Tour, and Forever Still, a short film featuring live performances of songs from the album, which was released in 2013. The duo initially rejected a deal to distribute the album at Starbucks stores months before and the album was leaked in February 2012. The album debuted at number seven on the US Billboard 200, selling 41,000 copies in its first week, earning the duo their highest-charting album and first top 10 entry on the chart; it also charted within the top 20 in six other countries.

== Background ==
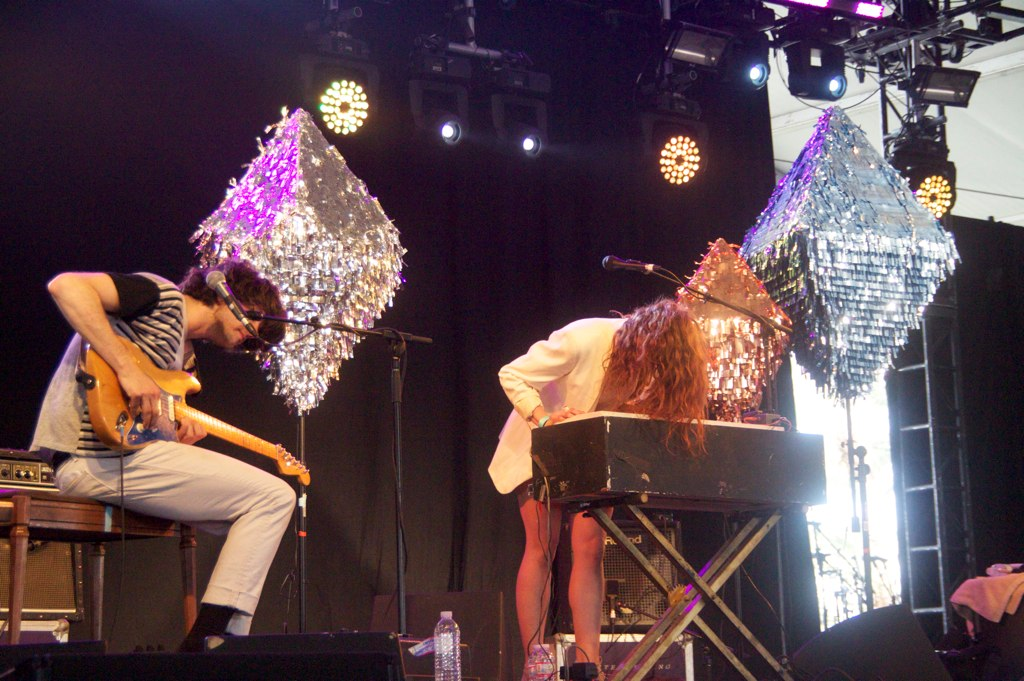
Beach House performing at Coachella 2010.

Beach House began writing and recording their third studio album in 2009, which would serve as a follow-up to their second studio album Devotion (2008). In the midst of doing so, they were offered a contract signing with American record label Sub Pop on September of that year, whose cash infusion would allow the duo to work with producer Chris Coady, who would then contribute on production for the album. With this deal, they also announced their third studio album Teen Dream (2010) and its slated release through the label, marking their departure from Carpark Records, where they released their first two studio albums.

Despite Teen Dream being leaked on the internet later in 2009, it saw an official release through Sub Pop on January 26, 2010, becoming their first album release through the label. It was met with critical acclaim upon release. Teen Dream was also a commercial success, selling over 137,000 units by May 2012, according to Nielsen SoundScan. In 2011, guitarist Alex Scally stated that, as soon as Beach House finish touring for Teen Dream, which was considered as their breakthrough album, they were going to wait for the writing procedure of their next album to be inspired. That same year, while touring, they have also had thoughts about working on their fourth studio album, revealing that they have already written a few songs for it.

== Writing and recording ==
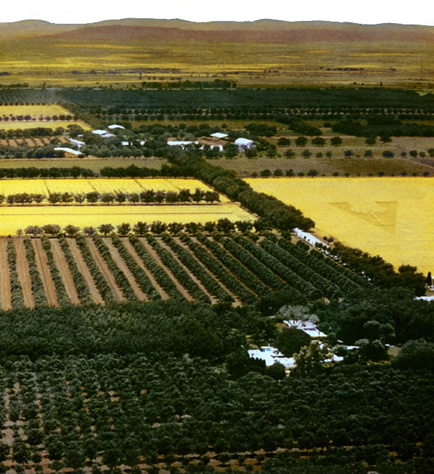
Orchards surrounding Sonic Ranch (pictured), where Bloom was recorded within a period of nine weeks in 2011.

Beach House conceptualized some ideas for Bloom while and after recording Teen Dream (2010). In March 2011, like they have done with their previous albums, they began writing Bloom in their hometown, Baltimore. A portion of the writing was done in between various sound checks and "myriad" experiences while on tour for two years. Lead vocalist Victoria Legrand stated that they had at least 30 ideas for Bloom, with only 10 of those going towards the album. "Wild" was written while they were in the mixing process of Teen Dream, being the earliest song written for the album; this track, along with "Other People", were previously performed on different live shows in 2011. The song title for its lead single "Myth" originates from the word "myths" being written on Legrand's notebook, serving as a "beautiful journey of what it takes to make something and to create something, and the vastness of that". That song was written on October 24, 2011, alongside "Troublemaker". While writing "Lazuli", Legrand said that the word "lazuli" seemed to have an insight, and also stated that she had always considered the word to be part of the "Beach House world". "On the Sea" is one of the duo's favorite songs recorded from the album, with Legrand stating that it felt like a "trip" and Scally revealing that it doesn't involve the usage of any drums and was solely based on a recapitulating chord progression.

Other songs were also written years prior, stating that they have continued writing them since then, including the album's hidden track, "Wherever You Go", which was written during the Teen Dream recording sessions and wasn't finished up until the Bloom sessions; the duo stated that they loved the song but thought it was reminiscent of their previous style of music. Another song recorded during these sessions was "Equal Mind", which did not appear on the album and was instead released as the B-side to the physical single release of "Lazuli" after realizing that it had instrumental similarities to "Other People", specifically its tempo; due to this, they stated that it "did not fit" on the album. At first, it was confirmed that the song would "never exist" in a digital format. "Saturn Song", which is built around a piano loop recorded around this time, was another song being worked on during these sessions, which later saw an official release as part of the compilation album The Space Project (2014). These three tracks were later remastered and included on the duo's compilation album B-Sides and Rarities (2017). After writing a quantity of songs for the album, they recorded several demos in their practice space in their hometown. Thereafter, as soon as the duo finished touring in support of Teen Dream, they began recording the album at Sonic Ranch in Tornillo, Texas, in which Chris Coady again handled production, as well as engineering and mixing, and live drums and percussion were provided by Daniel Franz, who was initially rumored to be the third member of Beach House, being their touring drummer since 2008.

When the duo arrived to Sonic Ranch, they were surprised and pointed out that the studio complex had "almost exactly the same dimensions as Dreamland", where they recorded their previous album Teen Dream (2010). Approaching the recording process through the "all-work-and-no-play" method, the entire album was recorded on a 24-track analog tape, which is a form of "staying true to the art of sound", and the duo brought their own instruments to the recording sessions, avoiding the usage of the studio's provided instruments. Coady also placed several distant microphones in the recording room to record the spacious guitar sounds. The album was recorded within a period of nine weeks, which was three times longer than the recording sessions for Teen Dream. It has also been said that it took seven weeks or two months. They chose to record in Texas after being captivated by the area while staying at a motel in El Paso during a tour. They also stated that they recorded there for "very unglamorous, technical" reasons, explaining that "it's not just about going someplace cool to record just because it’s cool". Additional vocals for Bloom were recorded at Magpie Cage in Baltimore, with mixing also being handled at Electric Lady Studios in New York City, where it was initially rumored in January 2012 that Beach House had worked on the album. Legrand stated that developing Bloom was a "more intense" experience for them.

== Musical style ==
Bloom has been described as a dream pop album, with musical influences, which are found throughout separate tracks on the album, being labelled as shoegaze, indie pop and new wave. Like their previous album Teen Dream, Beach House continue to employ the usage of live drums, with its overall music arrangements and structures being "uncomplicated and meticulously" assembled, featuring thrumming synthesizers, luminous and jangly guitar tones, winding pre-programmed tempos, amorphous drones and twinkling melodies. By sticking to this style, the duo leans away from their initial lo-fi and ambient music influences found within their earlier studio albums, now going more towards a "high-grade" pop attempt. Throughout the album, there are newer sounds and instrumental elements that were not included in the duo's previous albums, including an autoharp, synthesizers, pianos and live strings. Michell Eloy of Paste stated that the structural elements of the duo's sound remain the same on this album, yet they are arranged in such way that intensifies the duo's distinct musical style, complimenting its polished production.

Songs within Bloom contains lyrical themes that revolve around death, heartbreak, lost love, revival, longing and the inability of moving on; Lindsay Zoladz of Pitchfork stated that the album features more "straightforward" lyrics, "yet they're somehow suggestive of larger things". Heather Phares of AllMusic also stated that its "shimmering remoteness enhances the album's philosophical, searching approach to love and loss". Such lyrics also leave the album open for listener's interpretation, according to the duo. Scally also discussed about the album's feeling and association of the color blue with an author at Vice, who envisioned their entire catalog with that exact color; Scally attributed this statement to the album's third track, "Lazuli". Each song on the album is at least four minutes long. Some critics also noted the usage of field recordings that are used to seamlessly transition a majority of the songs on the album, including sounds of birds chirping and cars passing by. Stated in an interview with Pitchfork, there are a total of four recordings of such, with Scally revealing that one of them is the sound of a flock of coyotes.

Initially, Beach House hinted that Bloom would feature a more darker sound than Teen Dream and wanted it to have a "similar vision" to albums such as The Beach Boys' Pet Sounds (1966), The Cure's Disintegration (1989) and Depeche Mode's Violator (1990). American singer-songwriter Bob Dylan was also an influence on the album, specifically one of the verses from his song "Mr. Tambourine Man", which Scally had listened to during his adolescence; upon remembering the verse halfway through the writing process of Bloom, the duo wanted that same feeling compacted onto the album. In regards to the album's narrative, Scally explained that they wanted the album to "have a certain feeling at the beginning, middle and an end" and conceptualized the album to feel like a story, though stated that listeners should be able to construct their own narratives based on how they hear the album, further noting that controlling people's reactions serves no purpose. He had also stated in a separate interview that the songs "encompass a much bigger slice of life".

== Songs ==
"Myth"
"Myth", the lead single and first track from Bloom, features a key change found in the middle of the song, as well as "layers of echo" applied to Legrand's voice.

Bloom begins with its lead single, "Myth", which starts with a simple cowbell beat, also well as arpeggiated keys and a build-up of live drums, along with a bass synth that begins playing before Legrand starts singing the first verse about 45 seconds in, "Drifting in and out, you see the road you're on". The song incorporates an "amalgam of sinuous guitars, glistening synths, galloping drums [and] hazy reverb". There is a key change after its two verses, along with a guitar solo as its outro, which uses a fusion of distortion and delay effects. "Wild" is a mid-tempo, new wave-like track, centered around a triple metre tambourine "boom-tish" drum beat, "epic shoegazing" guitars, and a "buzzing" synth, as well as reverb. Described as "brazen [and] epic", Legrand ends her choruses in the track with "Go on pretending". Titled after and lyrically revolving around the metamorphic rock, lapis lazuli, "Lazuli" begins with "twinkling" arpeggiated keys identical to ones produced by a Casiotone keyboard, as well as synth strings, and overlapping vocals and unified harmonies within the track's finale. An indie pop number, "Other People" features a gauzy organ and lyrics which are thought to surround a failed relationship. The track was described as a "shoegaze Fleetwood Mac" track by Alex Denney of NME.

"The Hours" features a "chintzy" drum machine, as well as a "glorious and angelic multi-tracked" female choir of sighs at the beginning of the track, similar to those of the duo's 2010 track "Zebra", before going into a captivating composition with "janglesome" guitar runs. Legrand stated that the track is "almost a saga" and that "it has a really wild, imaginative force to it". Zack Kotzer and David Greenwald of The A.V. Club stated that it "shifts with ease from a driving riff to strolling arpeggios". "Troublemaker", which features Legrand's heavy breathing, consists of lyrics surrounding the oddities of nostalgia and memory, additionally revolving around a warning of bad romance. "New Year" is a "haunting" track which features a line of shoegaze-like guitars, including lyrics that are centered around someone coming to terms of loss. "Wishes" is a mid-tempo and "quietly spectacular" track, which is reminiscent of "classic 50s pop", centered around a synth pad and programmed drum machines, with Scally performing a guitar solo about two minutes in. Annie Zaleski of Alternative Press correlated the song to Cyndi Lauper's cover song "All Through the Night", while Mike Powell of Spin stated that the song, along with "Myth" and "Troublemaker", are supported by programmed rhythm numbers which are "eerily heavy [and] almost inevitable".

"On the Sea" is a ballad that begins with a progression of "gently strummed" acoustic guitar chords, with a minimalist "saloon-like" piano that slowly fades in. At the end of the track, its instrumental layers beginning to fade out, ending with "windswept" sound effects, which lead into the final track from the album, "Irene". Described by Jon Pareles of The New York Times as a "majestic march", a single guitar note and a "steadfast" drum beat is steadily repeated in the middle of the track, with Legrand subsequently repeating "It's a strange paradise" persistently in the song's outro. According to the duo, the song was recorded in one take, while according to Scally, it was originally intended to repeat and fade out, but they did not end up considering the "arc of the feeling" found in the track and continued "jamming". Legrand also described the recording of the song as a special moment for them. "Irene" then goes into a six-minute silence before a hidden track starts at the 13:16 mark, later titled "Wherever You Go"; the track relies on a musical style reminiscent of their debut studio album, featuring a drum machine and a slide guitar, though it is also described to have a sound similar to a steel guitar. Scally explained that they did not want the hidden track to be part of the album, and instead serves as a "wink" at the end of the album.

== Packaging and title ==
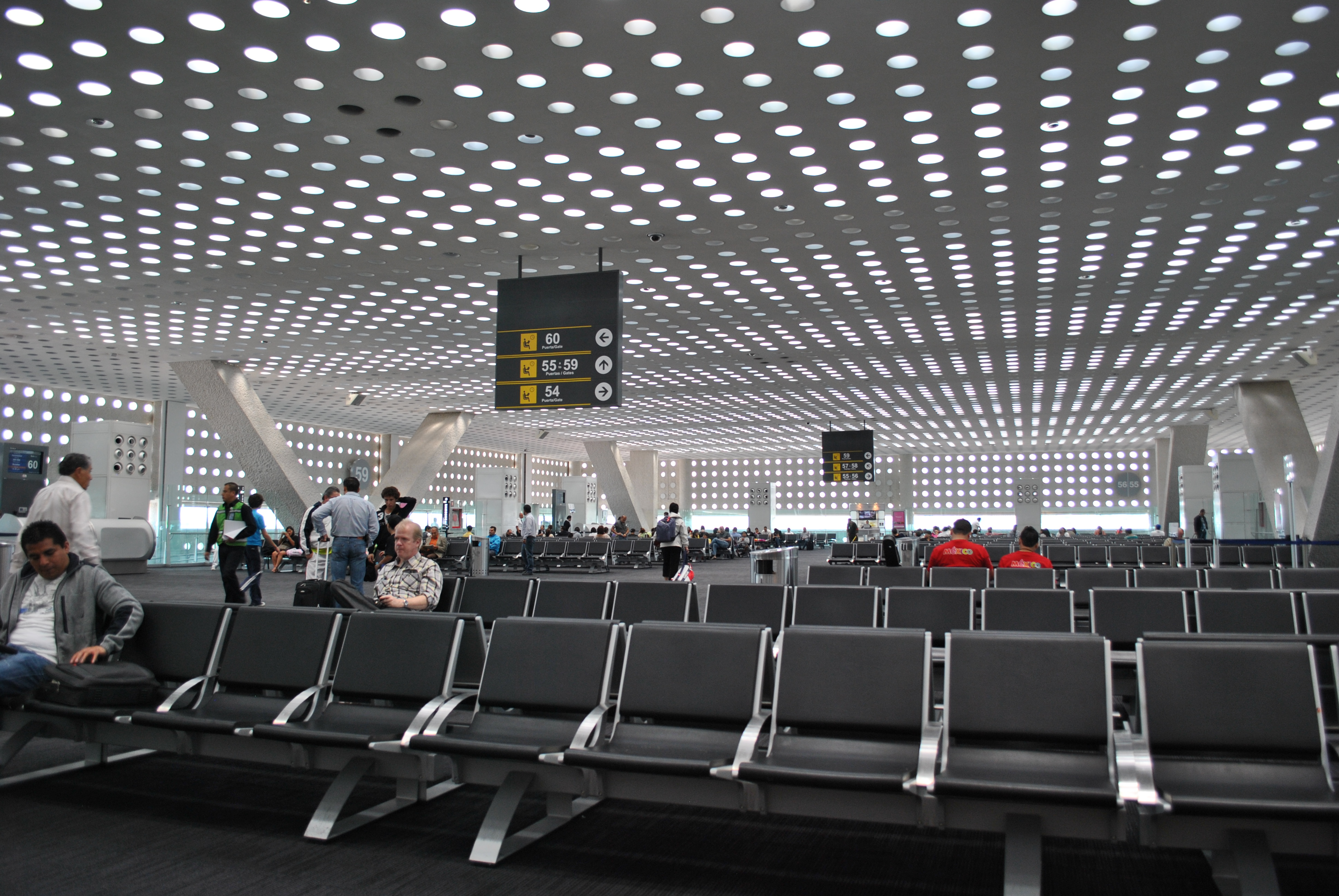
The cover art for Bloom was designed from a photograph taken inside Mexico City International Airport (pictured in 2011) by the duo.

On March 20, 2012, the official album artwork for Bloom was revealed. Designed by Brian Roettinger, it depicts a black-and-white polka dot pattern. For the artwork designing process, the duo kept a travelog of photographs taken in different formats, including some taken on a Polaroid and other digital cameras, and gave a set of photos to Roettinger, who wanted the artwork to be "purely iconographic". Art direction was handled by the duo, who chose to use a photograph of ceiling lights, which were from the interior of Mexico City International Airport, taken on a mobile phone camera by Legrand while on tour. Beach House wanted to stick to simplicity for the cover art, avoiding any "lavish" concepts. Aside from the standard black vinyl records, Bloom was also released on two limited vinyl variants, with one having white-colored vinyl and the other having vinyl that glow in the dark, both designed by the duo. According to Roettinger, the white parts on the front and back covers of the physical versions of Bloom (vinyl and CD) were embossed with six coats of glow-in-the-dark ink.

The album's title, Bloom, has a variety of meanings according to the duo in various interviews. Legrand stated that the word "bloom" became the album title halfway through its creation process, noting that around that stage they were able to see the immensity of the album and comprehend an "area of feelings and intensities and dangers and twists and turns and gaps". She also explained to The Line of Best Fit that their purpose of choosing the title was because of the "incredible forces" found within the album, adding that each track is more immensive "than [the tracks] on [Teen Dream] in terms of starting off in one place and ending up in another". In a different interview with The Village Voice, she explained the title as an "abstraction of many feelings" and that it was derived from feeling and a hypothesis of the word. Scally explained to Pitchfork that "the word ["bloom"] is like an object – we were thinking 'bloom,' 'doom.' It encapsulated tons: the bloom, the end of the bloom, and then coming back the next year.

== Release and sales ==
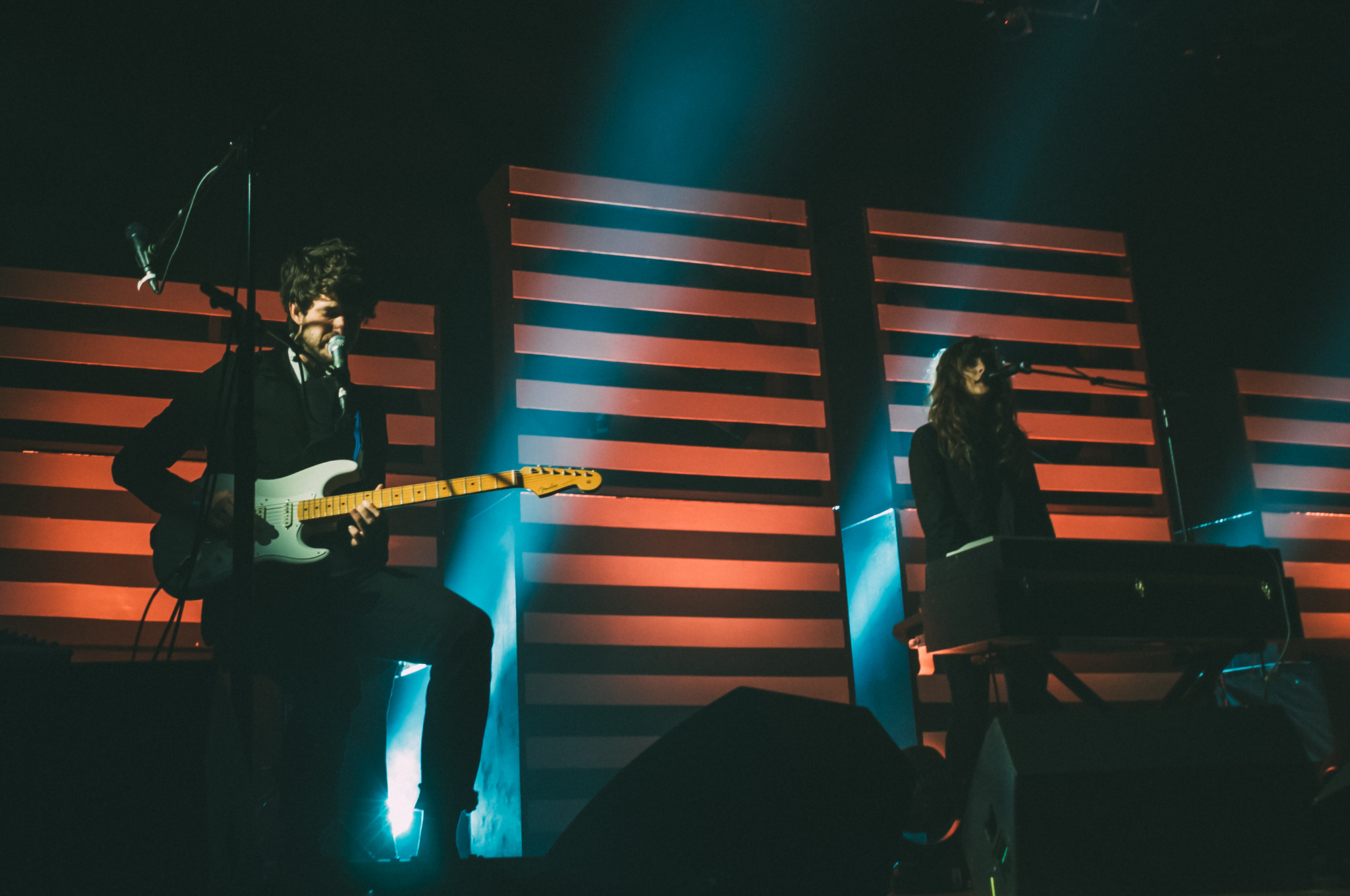
Beach House performing at the House of Blues in San Diego in July 1, 2012.

Bloom was released on May 15, 2012, in North America through Sub Pop and Arts & Crafts México, on CD, double-LP and digital download formats. It was also released on May 14 in Europe through Bella Union and on May 18 in Australia through Mistletone. Several months before its release and promotion process, Beach House were given an opportunity to distribute the album at various Starbucks stores, to which they eventually rejected after some consideration, with Legrand reiterating that this decision, among others for the duo, are done based on maintaining their fanbase. (Note: Attributed to various interviews with Billboard, Pitchfork, The Baltimore Sun and Houston Press.) At around this time, the duo had reflected on their involvement in an overabundant amount of live sessions and photo shoots, with the outcome being "far below [their] personal artistic standards", instead deciding that they would only partake in persuasive activities that they were able to "control artistically and give substantial energy".

In January 2012, Electric Lady Studios posted an image of Beach House on its Facebook page, captioned, "Just wrapped the new Beach House record in Studio A... such a rad record // band", raising speculation that Bloom was worked on at that recording studio. The post was later removed from their page. Chris Cantalini of Gorilla vs. Bear confirmed on Twitter a response from Sub Pop representatives, who stated that Electric Lady Studios "jumped the gun" when publishing the photo. In February, it was reported that the duo's fourth studio album would be released on May 15 of the same year, with a supposedly official tracklist being revealed and its title reportedly being titled Bloom. (Note: Exclaim! first reported the alleged information about Bloom but took down the article about it shortly after, according to Pitchfork, Obscure Sound and DIY.) At around the same month, Bloom was leaked on the Internet, with Legrand recalling that their previous studio albums had also been leaked in the past. The leaked version of the album featured low-quality versions of tracks, which were additionally shortened or sped-up, with Scally asserting that they wanted to release the album in a specific way. On March 7, the duo would release the single "Myth" on their website as a free download. The next day, they would confirm the album's official release dates and track list, with "Myth" serving as its lead single. On May 6, 2012, Bloom was streamed in its entirety on NPR Music. Frank Nieto, a publicist for Sub Pop, chose NPR Music to publish the album's first stream, stating that it "legitimized [the duo] as an artist".

On May 18, Billboard initially projected that Bloom would debut at number 10 on the US Billboard 200, which would give the duo their first album to appear within the chart's top 10. It ultimately debuted at number seven on the chart, selling 41,000 copies in its first week, becoming the duo's best selling album on the chart. It stayed on the chart for 11 weeks, making it their longest charting album to date. In addition, the album debuted at number one on the Independent Albums and Top Alternative Albums charts, remaining for 18 and seven weeks on both charts, respectively, and peaked at number three on the Top Rock Albums chart, charting for nine weeks. It also debuted at number 15 on the UK Albums Chart, further debuting within the top 20 in six other countries, which include Belgium's Flanders region (10), Canada (16), Denmark (8), Ireland (10), Norway (5), and Portugal (10). According to Mediatraffic, the album would sell over 100,000 copies worldwide by March 2013. On October 16, 2026, Bloom received a gold certification by the Recording Industry Association of America (RIAA), denoting a total of 500,000 units sold in the United States, currently being one of their three albums to receive such certification.

== Promotion ==
=== Singles and music videos ===
On March 7, 2012, Beach House released the lead single from Bloom, "Myth", on their website as a free download. The single garnered acclaim from music critics, who considered it another fascinating evolution in the duo's musical style. On April 12, 2023, "Myth" received a gold certification by the Recording Industry Association of America (RIAA), denoting a total of 500,000 units sold in the United States, being the album's first song to receive a certification. On April 13, the album's second single "Lazuli" was leaked onto Dutch radio station 3voor12's website, shortly being taken down. On April 17, the duo officially released the single for streaming, initially on YouTube. It was later released as a 7-inch single on opaque-blue vinyl on April 21, 2012, Record Store Day, which was limited to 2,400 copies. The single release also included "Equal Mind" as its B-side. On June 6, the official music video for "Lazuli" was released. Directed by Allen Cordell, the video features "shadowy" perspectives of three strangers, with one of the environmental surroundings being a "psychedelic, outer-space realm". On November 14, the duo released the accompanying music video for "Wild". Featuring video direction from Johan Renck, the video consists of a series of "intense moments", including violent and sexual scenes.

On January 1, 2013, New Year's Day, the duo released a music video for "New Year", which features time-lapse video recordings, which were filmed by Manuel Calderon, of the album's recording sessions at Sonic Ranch. The duo explained that it is "more of a home video thing" and thought that the video clips, cherished as memories, were suitable for this song. On February 4, 2013, the duo released Forever Still, a short film containing performances of four songs from the album ("Wild", "The Hours", "Wishes" and "Irene") throughout El Paso and Tornillo, Texas, where they recorded the album. Taking inspiration from Pink Floyd's Live at Pompeii concert film, the duo wanted to perform the songs in an abnormal setting without losing the spirit of their music and felt that the songs would better resonate in a transcendent scenery. On March 7, 2013, the duo released the music video for the track "Wishes", which was directed by Eric Wareheim of comedy duo Tim and Eric. This is the first collaborative project between Wareheim and the duo, with the former stating that the video's setting was influenced by Legrand's imagery, praising the duo as one of his favorites. The video features actor Ray Wise, who is seen performing the song at the halftime show of a surreal sports game. Rolling Stone listed it as the seventh best music video of 2013, while Pitchfork added it on their "Top Music Videos of 2013" list.

=== Live performances ===
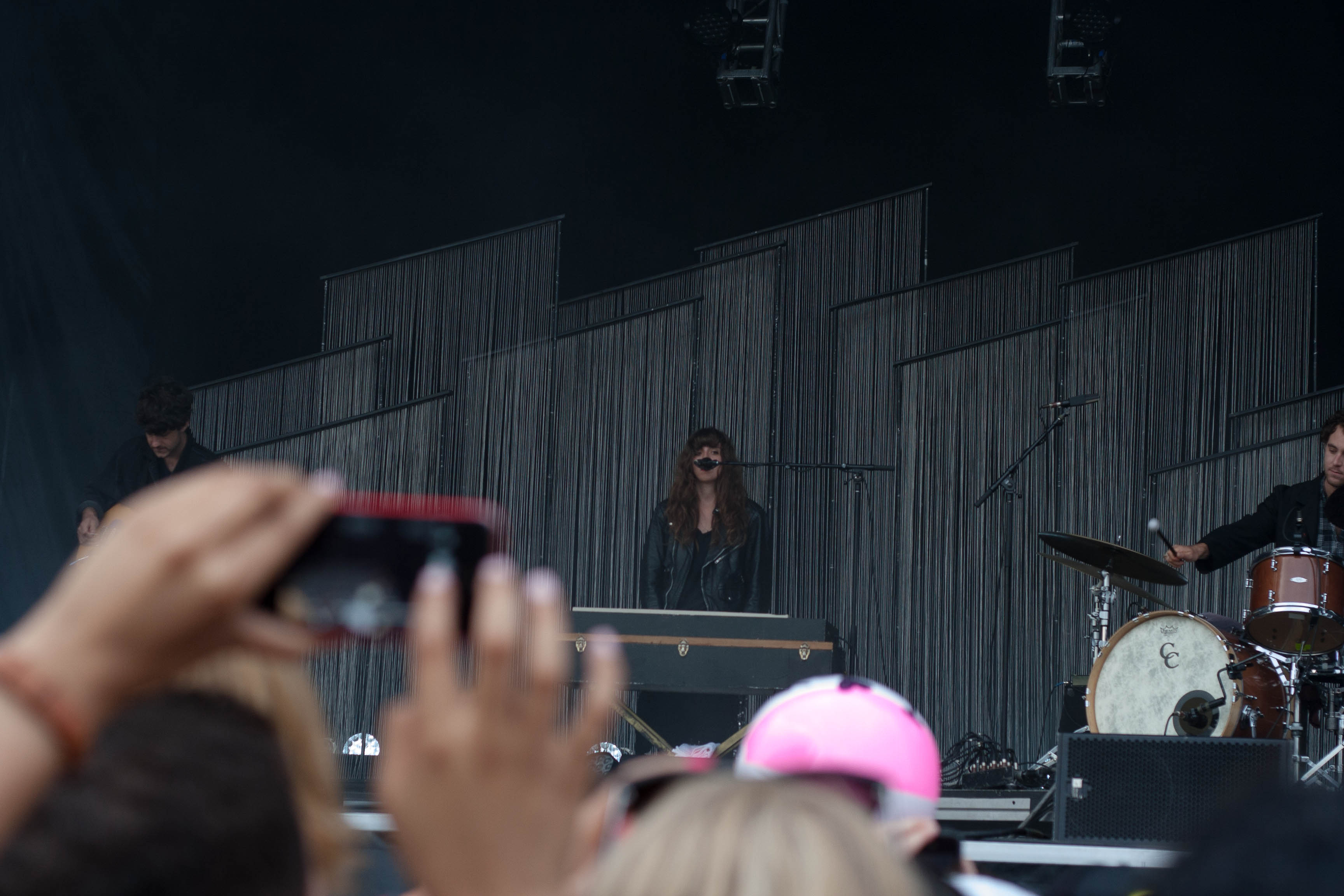
Beach House performing at Lollapalooza 2013 in August 2013.

On March 8, 2012, alongside the album's confirmation, the duo announced the album's supporting tour dates in North America, with its start date being on May 4, at Charlottesville, and its end date on July 23, in New York City. They later added extra tour dates, spanning from July 1 to 21, with indie rock band Wild Nothing as openers for most of those dates. The setlist for their release show at the Bowery Ballroom in New York City on May 15, the same day Bloom was released, consisted of songs from the album and Teen Dream, as well as "Gila" and "Turtle Island" from their second album Devotion (2008); Daniel Franz performed the live drums throughout. On June 2, Beach House performed at Primavera Sound 2012, with their set consisting of windmills and a star-lit background, similar to those at their performance in New York City. They later performed their set at the Pitchfork Music Festival 2012 on July 15, which featured cityscape-like cardboard cutouts as a background behind them throughout. Soon after touring, dates for a supporting international fall tour, marketed as the Frightened Eyes tour, were announced, commencing on September 13, in Richmond, Virginia, and concluding on November 19, in Amsterdam.

Aside from touring in 2012, the duo have also performed songs from Bloom on various talk shows; they performed "Myth" on Late Show with David Letterman on May 18, and on Later... with Jools Holland on May 22, performing "Lazuli" on the show a week later. On July 2, they performed a live in-studio session on KCRW's radio program Morning Becomes Eclectic. On July 24, they performed "Wild" and "Wishes" on Late Night with Jimmy Fallon, with the latter having a web-only exclusive performance instead. Soon after finishing touring that year, they announced an expansion of 2013 international tour dates, including stops at Australia and Japan, starting on December 30, at the former and concluding in Cincinnati on April 24, 2013. Throughout 2013, the duo also performed sets at various music festivals, including Coachella, Governors Ball, Bonnaroo, Lollapalooza, and Øyafestivalen. In July 2014, the duo announced the Northern Exposure Tour, with concert dates taking place in Alaska and Canada; this was their first headlining tour to take place in those locations.

== Critical reception ==
Bloom ratings
Aggregate scores
| Source | Rating |
|---|---|
| AnyDecentMusic? | 7.4/10 |
| Metacritic | 78/100 |
Review scores
| Source | Rating |
| AllMusic | (Note: Initially, the album received a four-star rating by AllMusic upon its release in 2012. This rating was later changed to four and a half stars in 2021, and later to five stars in 2026.) |
| The A.V. Club | A− |
| Consequence of Sound | A− |
| The Guardian | 3/5 stars |
| Mojo | 4/5 stars |
| NME | 7/10 |
| Pitchfork | 9.1/10 |
| Q | 4/5 stars |
| Rolling Stone | 3.5/5 stars |
| Spin | 8/10 |

Bloom was met with universal acclaim from music critics upon release, with a majority praising its polished production, despite some criticism on it being superficial. At Metacritic, which assigns a normalized rating out of 100 to reviews from mainstream critics, the album received an average score of 78, based on 45 reviews, which indicates "generally favorable reviews". Aggregator AnyDecentMusic? gave it 7.4 out of 10, based on their assessment of the critical consensus.

In his review for PopMatters, Zachary Houle gave Bloom a perfect score and called it a "landmark" release, praising Beach House's usage of the verse–chorus form within tracks and concluding that the entire album is "absolutely golden from end to end". Lindsay Zoladz of Pitchfork awarded the album the Best New Music accolade, praising the interplay between Legrand and Scally, writing that the two "sound in perfect sync", then supporting this claim by stating, "his nimble riffs punctuate her long, drawn-out notes to add depth and layered rhythm to the tracks". Harley Brown of Consequence of Sound gave Bloom a A− rating, stating that it "culminates six years and three albums of anticipatory ache with subtlety and meticulous song placement that unfolds if you let it", while BBC Music's Hari Ashurst felt that the album was the duo's best work thus far. Zack Kotzer and David Greenwald of The A.V. Club also gave the album an A−, saying "Bloom takes what worked before and intensifies it" and that with the record, "they have mastered their sultry formula". The album also received a perfect score of five stars by AllMusic, with Heather Phares stating that though it is not the duo's "most immediate music", its "challenging mix of heartbroken words and aloof sounds" are worthy of repeatability.

Will Hermes of Rolling Stone said that "the melodies, guitarscapes and thrift-shop organ swells make for exquisite comfort". Alex Denney of NME called it a "glittering return" and added that they are "increasingly clever at turning a melody inside out to evoke those moments of dizzy-making clarity". J. Pace of Under the Radar complimented the instrumental arrangements throughout and concluded that they "serve up these completely affecting but somehow ethereal moods you can't quite put your finger on". Mike Powell of Spin complimented the usage of drum machines and rhythmic styles throughout the album, calling it a "gorgeous, firm album with very little at stake". Other reviews of Bloom were more mixed. Annie Zaleski of Alternative Press felt that the album did not possess "as many memorable hooks (or as many well-defined song structures)" as the duo's previous album, Teen Dream, and that as a result, "the record tends to fade into the background and become something so indistinct that it's forgettable, even after multiple listens". Maddy Costa of The Guardian criticized the album's lack of surprises, writing that "nothing happens to shatter the perfect surface, either within individual songs or across the album as a whole". In a negative review, Andy Gill of The Independent felt that Bloom was "pleasantly undemanding", noting that its overall momentum lessens after its openers, "Myth" and "Wild", and stating that it "just seems to evaporate away halfway through".

=== Rankings ===
Bloom has appeared on many year-end lists of critics ranking the best albums of 2012, several of them including it in their top 10: Magnet and Under the Radar included Bloom at number three, PopMatters and Obscure Sound at number four, Billboard at number six, Consequence of Sound, Gorilla vs. Bear, and Pitchfork at number seven. The latter added the album on their list of The 100 Best Albums of the Decade So Far, which included albums released within 2010 and 2014, appearing at number 53. Paste also named it the ninth best album of 2012, additionally including it on their list of the best albums of the first-half of the 21st century, appearing at number 70. Other publications included the album in their top 30, including AllMusic, Complex, Exclaim!, NME, No Ripcord, Rolling Stone,—who also named the album track "Other People" as the 19th best song of 2012,—and Stereogum. Crack and Treble named it as one of the best albums of the 2010s. Bloom was nominated for Album of the Year at the 2013 Libera Awards.

Select rankings for Bloom
| Publication | List | Rank | Ref. |
|---|---|---|---|
| AllMusic | Best of 2012 | 22 | |
| Billboard | 10 Best Albums of 2012 | 6 | |
| Complex | The 50 Best Albums of 2012 | 13 | |
| Consequence | Top 50 Albums of 2012 | 7 | |
| Exclaim! | Top 50 Albums of the Year | 19 | |
| Gorilla vs. Bear | The Albums of 2012 | 7 | |
| Magnet | Top 25 Albums of 2012 | 3 | |
| NME | 50 Best Albums Of 2012 | 22 | |
| Obscure Sound | Best Albums of 2012: Top Ten | 4 | |
| Paste | The 50 Best Albums of 2012 | 9 | |
| Paste | The 250 Greatest Albums of the 21st Century So Far | 70 | |
| Pitchfork | The Top 50 Albums of 2012 | 7 | |
| Pitchfork | The 100 Best Albums of the Decade So Far (2010–2014) | 53 | |
| PopMatters | The 75 Best Albums of 2012 | 4 | |
| Rolling Stone | 50 Best Albums of 2012 | 28 | |
| Stereogum | Top 50 Albums of 2012 | 27 | |
| Under the Radar | Top 100 Albums of 2012 | 3 | |

== Track listing ==
All lyrics written by Victoria Legrand; all music composed and arranged by Alex Scally and Legrand with assistance from Daniel Franz.

| No. | Title | Length |
|---|---|---|
| 1. | "Myth" | 4:18 |
| 2. | "Wild" | 4:58 |
| 3. | "Lazuli" | 5:01 |
| 4. | "Other People" | 4:24 |
| 5. | "The Hours" | 4:11 |
| 6. | "Troublemaker" | 4:55 |
| 7. | "New Year" | 5:25 |
| 8. | "Wishes" | 4:46 |
| 9. | "On the Sea" | 5:32 |
| 10. | "Irene" (ends at 6:44; hidden track "Wherever You Go" starts at 13:16) | 16:57 |
| Total length: | | 60:27 |

== Personnel ==
Credits adapted from liner notes of Bloom.

Beach House

- Victoria Legrand – vocals, keyboards, organ, piano
- Alex Scally – guitar, basses, piano, organ and keyboards, backing vocals; drum machine edits/programming

Additional musicians

- Daniel Franz – live drums and percussion
- Joe Cueto – viola (track 9)

Production

- Chris Coady – production, engineering, mixing
- Beach House – production
- Manuel Calderon – assistant engineering
- Brooks Harlan – engineering
- Phil Joly – assistant engineering
- Joe LaPorta – mastering

Artwork

- Beach House – photography
- Brian Roettinger – design

== Charts ==
=== Weekly charts ===
Weekly chart performance for Bloom
| Chart (2012) | Peak position |
|---|---|
| Australian Albums (ARIA) | 40 |
| Belgian Albums (Ultratop Flanders) | 10 |
| Belgian Albums (Ultratop Wallonia) | 55 |
| Canadian Albums (Billboard) | 16 |
| Danish Albums (Hitlisten) | 8 |
| Dutch Albums (Album Top 100) | 54 |
| French Albums (SNEP) | 59 |
| German Albums (Offizielle Top 100) | 73 |
| Irish Albums (IRMA) | 10 |
| Irish Independent Albums (IRMA) | 2 |
| Norwegian Albums (VG-lista) | 5 |
| Portuguese Albums (AFP) | 10 |
| Scottish Albums (Official Charts) | 23 |
| Spanish Albums (Promusicae) | 22 |
| Swedish Albums (Sverigetopplistan) | 34 |
| Swiss Albums (Schweizer Hitparade) | 33 |
| UK Albums (Official Charts) | 15 |
| UK Independent Albums (Official Charts) | 2 |
| US Billboard 200 | 7 |
| US Independent Albums (Billboard) | 1 |
| US Top Alternative Albums (Billboard) | 1 |
| US Top Rock Albums (Billboard) | 3 |

=== Year-end charts ===
Year-end chart performance for Bloom
| Chart (2012) | Position |
|---|---|
| US Independent Albums (Billboard) | 25 |
| US Top Alternative Albums (Billboard) | 37 |
| US Top Rock Albums (Billboard) | 61 |

== Certifications ==
Certifications for Bloom
| Region | Certification | Certified units/sales |
|---|---|---|
| United States (RIAA) | Gold | 500,000^{‡} |
^{‡} Sales+streaming figures based on certification alone.

== Release history ==
Release dates and formats for Bloom
| Country | Date | Label | Format(s) | Ref. |
|---|---|---|---|---|
| United Kingdom | May 14, 2012 | Bella Union | CD; LP; cassette; digital download | |
| United States | May 15, 2012 | Sub Pop | CD; LP; cassette; digital download | |
| Canada | May 15, 2012 | Sub Pop | CD; LP; cassette; digital download | |
| Mexico | May 15, 2012 | Arts & Crafts México | CD; LP; cassette; digital download | |
| Australia | May 18, 2012 | Mistletone | CD; LP; cassette; digital download | |
