= Chaos chaos =

Chaos chaos may refer to:

- Chaos chaos, a former name of the amoeboid Chaos carolinensis
- Chaos Chaos, an American indie band
- Chaos Chaos (album), a 2018 album by the band
- Jevil's catchphrase in Deltarune
