= Cruise Your Illusion =

Studio album by Milk Music
- Released: April 2, 2013
- Genres: Alternative rock, punk rock, indie rock
- Length: 42:44
- Label: Fat Possum
- Producer: Milk Music

Milk Music chronology
Almost Live (2012)	Cruise Your Illusion (2013)	USA '13 (2014)

Cruise Your Illusion is the debut studio album by American punk rock group Milk Music. It was released on April 2, 2013, via Fat Possum Records on CD and digital formats. The vinyl version of the album was self-released by the band.

== Musical style ==
The album incorporates influences from various genres, including punk rock, indie rock, grunge, classic rock, post-punk and country music. The album is also described to have "the messy fingerprints of indie rock’s cherished first wave smeared all over it."

Neil Young and SST Records artists. Alex Coxen's vocals were also compared to "J. Mascis' froggy baritone, Bob Mould's sneering bite, and the tormented wailing of the Gun Club's Jeffrey Lee Pierce."

== Critical reception ==
Professional ratings
Aggregate scores
Source	Rating
Metacritic	80/100
Review scores
Source	Rating
Allmusic	4/5 stars
Consequence of Sound	C−
Exclaim!	8/10
NME	7/10
Paste	8.7/10
Pitchfork	(7.8/10)

Upon its release, Cruise Your Illusion received generally positive reviews from music critics. At Metacritic, which assigns a normalized rating out of 100 to reviews from critics, the album received an average score of 80, which indicates "generally favorable reviews", based on 12 reviews. Fred Thomas of Allmusic gave the album a positive review, stating: "Cruise Your Illusion holds enough of the band's personality to keep them from being a '90s cover band, but at times, the weight of their ragged influences sits heavy enough on the songs to obscure their most original aspects." Duncan Boyd of Exclaim! wrote: "Cruise Your Illusion sounds like proud, but humble music from a band doing exactly what they want on their terms." Noel Gardner of NME compared the album to The Men's 2013 album, New Moon, commenting: "The highs on The Men’s album are higher than Milk Music’s, but Cruise Your Illusion is the more cohesive statement."

Mark Lore of Paste praised the album, commenting: "Cruise Your Illusion is a record that will likely be spinning on turntables well into the future." Jenn Pelly of Pitchfork wrote: "Cruise Your Illusion holds its ground, but there are sociological elements to Milk Music's story that make the experience of the record even more fun." April Clare Welsh of The Quietus stated: "All shot through with the psychedelic heft of Neil Young & Crazy Horse, this is not a flash in the pan, a fumble in the dark or an album which loses its way but a cosmic paean to perfectionism that creates order out of the most beautiful chaos." Nevertheless, Ryan Bray of Consequence of Sound was rather mixed in his review, stating: "From the lean, scrappy production value to the grandiose guitar solos and Alex Coxen’s wobbling, vocal delivery a la Grant Hart, the record has the messy fingerprints of indie rock’s cherished first wave smeared all over it."

== Track listing ==
1. "Caged Dogs Run Wild" - 1:41
2. "Illegal And Free" - 5:24
3. "New Lease On Love" - 3:11
4. "Cruising With God" - 2:28
5. "Crosstown Wanderer" - 2:02
6. "No, Nothing, My Shelter" - 3:53
7. "Coyote Road" - 1:21
8. "I've Got A Wild Feeling" - 3:10
9. "Dogchild" - 4:05
10. "Lacey's Secret" - 3:17
11. "Runaway" - 4:09
12. "The Final Scene" - 8:08

== Personnel ==
Milk Music

- Alex Coxen – design, guitar, illustrations, layout, lettering, slide guitar, vocals
- Dave Harris – bass, guitar, EBow
- Joe Rutter – drums, backing vocals
- Charles Waring – guitar

Other personnel

- Dave Harvey – guitar, backing vocals
- Benjamin Tragdon – Photography
