= Stay Free =

Stay Free may refer to:

- Stay Free (album), an album by Ashford & Simpson (1979)
- Stay Free (The Sound of Arrows album), an album by The Sound of Arrows (2017)
- Stay Free!, a magazine about the politics of culture
- Stayfree (feminine hygiene), a brand of feminine hygiene products
- "Stay Free", a song by The Clash from Give 'Em Enough Rope

== See also ==
- Free to Stay, 2004 LP by Smoosh
