= Rick and Morty (soundtrack) =

The Rick and Morty Soundtrack

Soundtrack album by various artists
- Released: September 28, 2018
- Genre: Comedy
- Length: 57:27
- Label: Sub Pop
- Producers: Ryan Elder; Chad VanGaalen; clipping.; Dan Harmon; David Roback; Fraser McCulloch; Hope Sandoval; Justin Roiland

Singles from Rick and Morty
- 1. "Unity Says Goodbye" Released: July 1, 2015 (US); 2. "Tales from the Citadel" Released: April 7, 2017 (Japan); 3. "Goodbye Moonmen" Released: August 28, 2018; 4. "Memories" Released: September 28, 2018 (US & Japan)

Professional ratings
Review scores
Source	Rating
AllMusic	3.5/5 stars
Pitchfork	5.2/10
Spectrum Culture	2.75/5 stars
The Line of Best Fit	7/10

The Rick and Morty Soundtrack is the soundtrack to American adult animated science fiction sitcom Rick and Morty. It was released on September 28, 2018 via Sub Pop.

Following four singles that released by SubPop and subsequently released onto its limited 7" vinyl singles from April 1, 2015, to September 28, 2018.

The album is composed of 26 songs, 24 of which are from the first three seasons of the show, and 18 of which were composed by Ryan Elder specifically for the show. The album also includes songs by Chaos Chaos, Belly, Blonde Redhead and Mazzy Star, all of which have been featured in the show, as well as two new tunes from Chad VanGaalen and clipping. inspired by the show. The iTunes version of the album only contains 19 tracks (omitting "Look on Down From the Bridge", "Do You Feel It?", "Stab Him in the Throat", "Shuttering Light", "For the Damaged Coda", "Seal My Fate", and "Terryfold")

The album debuted at the top of the Billboard Vinyl Albums chart, at No. 2 on the Soundtracks chart, at No. 4 on the Independent Albums chart, at No. 19 on the Top Internet chart, at No. 22 on the Album Sales chart, and at No. 27 on the Top Digital chart.

== Track listing ==
No.	Title	Writer(s)	Producer(s)	Length
1.	"Rick and Morty Theme" (performed by Ryan Elder)	Ryan Elder	Ryan Elder	0:35
2.	"Jerry's Rick" (performed by Ryan Elder)	Elder	Ryan Elder	2:52
3.	"The Small Intestine Song" (performed by Dan Harmon, Justin Roiland and Ryan Elder)	Dan Harmon; Justin Roiland; Ryan Ridley; Elder	Ryan Elder	0:36
4.	"The Flu Hatin’ Rap" (performed by Dan Harmon and Ryan Elder)	Harmon; Elder	Ryan Elder; Dan Harmon	1:53
5.	"African Dream Pop" (performed by Ryan Elder)	Elder	Ryan Elder	2:42
6.	"Look on Down From the Bridge" (performed by Mazzy Star)	David Roback; Hope Sandoval	David Roback; Hope Sandoval	4:46
7.	"The Rick Dance" (performed by Justin Roiland, Lauren Hillman and Ryan Elder)	Harmon; Roiland; Elder	Ryan Elder	0:47
8.	"Goodbye Moonmen" (performed by Jemaine Clement and Ryan Elder)	Harmon; David Phillips; Elder	Ryan Elder	2:21
9.	"Summer and Tinkles" (performed by Tara Strong, Jevin Smith and Ryan Elder)	Harmon; Elder	Ryan Elder	0:51
10.	"Do You Feel It?" (performed by Chaos Chaos)	Chaos Chaos	Fraser McCulloch	4:11
11.	"Unity Says Goodbye" (performed by Ryan Elder)	Elder	Ryan Elder	2:21
12.	"Get Schwifty (C-131)" (performed by Justin Roiland and Ryan Elder)	Roiland; Elder	Ryan Elder; Justin Roiland	1:00
13.	"Raised Up (C-131)" (performed by Justin Roiland and Ryan Elder)	Roiland; Elder	Ryan Elder; Justin Roiland	0:51
14.	"Stab Him in the Throat" (performed by clipping.)	Daveed Diggs	Jonathan Snipes; William Hutson	3:26
15.	"Help Me I'm Gonna Die" (performed by Justin Roiland and Ryan Elder)	Alex Rubens; Roiland; Elder	Ryan Elder; Justin Roiland	0:40
16.	"Let Me Out" (performed by Justin Roiland and Ryan Elder)	Rubens; Roiland; Elder	Ryan Elder; Justin Roiland	0:34
17.	"Memories" (performed by Chaos Chaos)	Chaos Chaos	Fraser McCulloch	3:28
18.	"Stuttering Light" (performed by Chad VanGaalen)	Chad VanGaalen	Chad VanGaalen	3:03
19.	"Alien Jazz Rap" (performed by Dan Harmon and Ryan Elder)	Harmon; Elder	Ryan Elder; Dan Harmon	0:59
20.	"For the Damaged Coda" (performed by Blonde Redhead)	Kazu Makino; Amedeo Pace; Simone Pace		2:32
21.	"Fathers and Daughters" (performed by Dan Harmon, Asya Saavedra, Chloe Saavedra and Ryan Elder)	Harmon; Elder	Ryan Elder; Dan Harmon	1:56
22.	"Seal My Fate" (performed by Belly)	Tanya Donelly		4:04
23.	"Terryfold" (performed by Chaos Chaos and Justin Roiland)	Chaos Chaos; Roiland		2:30
24.	"Tales from the Citadel" (performed by Ryan Elder)	Elder	Ryan Elder	3:04
25.	"Rick and Morty Score Medley" (performed by Ryan Elder)	Elder	Ryan Elder	4:44
26.	"Human Music" (performed by Ryan Elder)	Roiland; Elder	Ryan Elder	0:40
Total length:				57:27

Box set special bonus track 7"
No.	Title	Length
27.	"Screaming Sun" (performed by Ryan Elder)

== Personnel ==
- Bridgette Kimbrough – creative producer
- Brandon Lively – creative director
- Trey Wadsworth – art direction, design
- Jeff Kleinsmith – art direction
- Robert Beatty – artwork
- Will Sweeney – artwork
- Saiman Chow – artwork
- Skinner – artwork
- Chris "CN" Noel – lacquer

== Charts ==
Chart (2018)	Peak position
US Billboard 200	107
US Top Comedy Albums (Billboard)	1
US Album Sales (Billboard)	22
US Vinyl Albums (Billboard)	1
US Independent Albums (Billboard)	4
US Tastemakers (Billboard)	6
US Top Soundtracks (Billboard)	4
