= Pitchfork Music Festival 2012 =

Music festival

- Dates: July 13–15, 2012
- Locations: Union Park, Chicago, United States
- Website: pitchforkmusicfestival.com

The Pitchfork Music Festival 2012 was held on July 13 to 15, 2012 at the Union Park, Chicago, United States. The festival was headlined by Feist, Godspeed You! Black Emperor and Vampire Weekend.

== Lineup ==
Headline performers are listed in boldface. Artists listed from latest to earliest set times.

Green
Friday, July 13	Saturday, July 14	Sunday, July 15
**Feist**; Big K.R.I.T. The Olivia Tremor Control	**Godspeed You! Black Emperor**; Sleigh Bells; Flying Lotus; Atlas Sound; The Psychic Paramount	**Vampire Weekend**; AraabMuzik; Real Estate; Iceage; Dirty Beaches

Red
Friday, July 13	Saturday, July 14	Sunday, July 15
Dirty Projectors; A$AP Rocky; Lower Dens	Hot Chip; Wild Flag; Cults; Cloud Nothings	Beach House; Chavez; Ty Segall; Unknown Mortal Orchestra

Blue
Friday, July 13	Saturday, July 14	Sunday, July 15
Purity Ring; Clams Casino; Japandroids; Tim Hecker; Willis Earl Beal; Outer Minds	Grimes; Danny Brown; Chromatics; Schoolboy Q Nicolás Jaar; Youth Lagoon; Liturgy; Lotus Plaza; The Atlas Moth	The Field; King Krule; Oneohtrix Point Never; Kendrick Lamar; The Men; Thee Oh Sees; Milk Music; A Lull
