= Grubby Little Hands =

American rock band

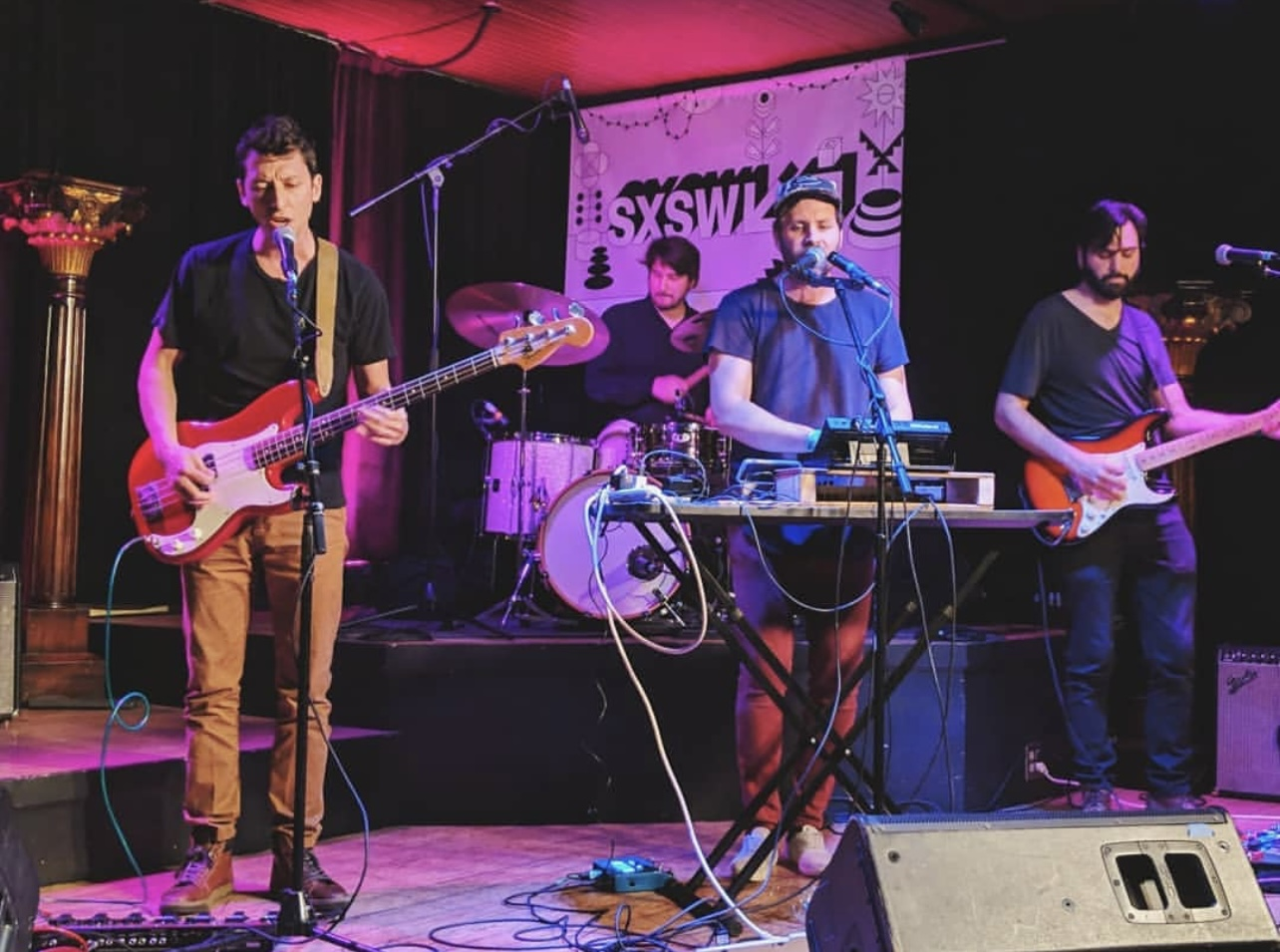
- The band Grubby Little Hands plays in Austin, TX, USA in 2019

Background information
- Origin: Philadelphia, Pennsylvania, U.S.
- Genres: indie rock; psychedelic rock
- Years active: 2007-
- Labels: Good Behavior Records; Lefse Records; Chill Mega Chill; Side Hustle Records
- Members: Donnie Felton; Brian Hall; Joseph Primavera; Chad Brown
- Website: grubbylittlehandsmusic.com

Grubby Little Hands is a psych-pop band from Philadelphia, Pennsylvania made up of members Donnie Felton, Brian Hall, Joseph Primavera, and Chad Brown.

The band was formed by Felton and Hall, who self-released their first album Imaginary Friends in 2009 and their follow-up The Grass Grew Around Our Feet in 2012 on their own label, Good Behavior Records. Primavera and Brown joined the band for the making of their third album Garden Party, released in 2016 via Lefse Records. They put out a collaborative EP called PHLMSY with Julie Odell in 2021 via Side Hustle Records and their fourth album World So Strange is scheduled for release in 2022. The band has toured multiple times, including festival appearances at SXSW (2017, 2019) and Valley of the Vapors (2017).

== History ==
=== 2007-2012: Formation, Imaginary Friends and The Grass Grew Around Our Feet ===
Songwriters and multi-instrumentalists Donnie Felton and Brian Hall met as music theory and composition students at Wake Forest University. They formed Grubby Little Hands in 2007 and began recording their debut album Imaginary Friends. Production stalled briefly in 2008 while Hall recovered from being stabbed in the abdomen in a random attack in Center City, Philadelphia (which would become lyrical subject matter on their later album, Garden Party). They self-released the album in October 2009. Pop Matters described them as sounding "like a more ramshackle Elephant Six band, with a folky bent that's not so much freaked as is pleasantly somnambulant or whimsically lazy." For their next record, The Grass Grew Around Our Feet, the duo formed their own label Good Behavior Records. They released the six-track collection in September 2012 and collaborated with filmmaker Brian Melton on a number of multi-media performances and videos. The album received praise from Yvynyl, Philebrity, Obscure Sound, and more.

=== 2013-2020: New Members, Garden Party and U.S. tours ===
After the completion of their sophomore album, guitarist Joseph Primavera and drummer Chad Brown joined the band. The foursome recorded their third album Garden Party in Primavera's studio, with additional contributions from sample engineer Michael Rothstein. After its completion, they signed to Lefse Records who released the album in April 2016 on vinyl, CD, and digitally. Garden Party was also released on cassette by Chill Mega Chill. Conceptually, the album is rooted in "existential anxiety" and reflects on both Hall's near-death experience and a prior incident in which Felton was beaten unconscious in a case of mistaken identity. Stereogum described the album as "deftly dense, switching aesthetics seamlessly and engagingly" and praised the band's "adept timing and command of temperament" as well as the "contemplative, challenging lyrics." Grubby Little Hands toured regularly in 2016 and 2017 in support of the album, including festival appearances at SXSW and Valley of the Vapors. At times their lineup would include additional keyboardists Doug Parker and Mark Saddlemire.

=== 2021-Present: PHLMSY and World So Strange ===
While on tour, the band met New Orleans singer-songwriter Julie Odell. Afterwards, the artists began collaborating – virtually, given their locations – and in 2021 released a 5-song EP called PHLMSY on Side Hustle Records. The name PHLMSY is a combination of the airport codes of their two cities, PHL and MSY.

In 2022, the band announced a forthcoming album World So Strange due April 15 on Side Hustle. They had previously released two of the singles – "Lula Fly" and "Surf Lullaby" – which Flood Magazine described as "a sharp pop track and perhaps the first real beach-ready cut of the year."

== Discography ==
- Imaginary Friends (2009)
- The Grass Grew Around Our Feet (2012)
- Garden Party (2016)
- PHLMSY (2021)
- World So Strange (2022)
