= Terryfold =

2017 single by Chaos Chaos featuring Justin Roiland

Single by Chaos Chaos featuring Justin Roiland

from the album The Rick and Morty Soundtrack
- Released: August 27, 2017
- Genre: Comedy music, dream pop, indie pop, psychedelic pop
- Length: 2:30
- Composer: Chaos Chaos
- Lyricist: Justin Roiland

Chaos Chaos singles chronology
"In This Place" (2013)	"Terryfold" (2017)	"Dripping with Fire" (2017)

"Terryfold" is a song written by American actor, voice actor, and animator Justin Roiland and recorded by American indie pop band Chaos Chaos. The song also features vocals from Roiland. It was released onto music streaming platforms and made available for digital download on August 27, 2017. The song was created for the American animated comedy series Rick and Morty, and was played during "Rest and Ricklaxation", the sixth episode of the series' third season.

== Background ==
The song played twice during "Rest and Ricklaxation", the sixth episode of the third season of Rick and Morty. The title characters, Rick and Morty, hear and enjoy the song as it plays over a radio. The song also played during the episode's credits.

== Critical reception ==
Nerdist commented that the song was "perhaps the most bizarre comedic counterweight" of the episode, and added that "the minimal R&B-leaning song is actually pretty fun musically, like a ridiculous mix of Vulfpeck, Mac DeMarco, and Midnite Vultures era Beck. The main draw, though, are the lyrics, which are almost exclusively about grabbing 'Terry fold flaps,' 'flappy folds,' 'foldy flaps,' and other variations on the theme." Vulture called the song "semi-sweet, questionable, and strangely soothing."

== Chart performance ==
Roiland had posted tweets expressing his hope for the song to chart and gain radio airplay. The song debuted at #1 on the Comedy Digital Song Sales chart dated September 16, 2017, after a sum of 2,000 downloads. According to Nielsen Music, the song accumulated 1.1 million U.S. streams and sold 1,000 downloads in the week ending September 7, 2017. As a result, the song debuted at #33 on the Billboard Hot Rock Songs chart dated September 23, 2017.

== Track listing ==
No.	Title	Lyrics	Music	Length
1.	"Terryfold"	Justin Roiland	Chaos Chaos	2:30
Total length:				2:30

== Personnel ==
- Justin Roiland – lyrics, vocals, artwork
- Chaos Chaos – additional vocals, songwriting
- Phil Levine – drum engineering and mixing
- Troupe Gammage – mixing, mastering

== Charts ==
Chart (2017)	Peak position	Ref.
U.S. Billboard Comedy Digital Song Sales	1	
U.S. Billboard Hot Rock Songs	33	
