= Online Ceramics =

American clothing company

- Industry: Fashion; Streetwear
- Founded: 2016
- Founders: Alix Ross; Elijah Funk
- Headquarters: Los Angeles, USA
- Website: Official website

Online Ceramics is a clothing company founded in Los Angeles, California in 2016 by Alix Ross and Elijah Funk. Many of their designs are tie-dyed by hand, and feature designs associated with the Grateful Dead and the A24 entertainment company.

The company's products are sold internationally at a variety of streetwear outlets, including Union in Los Angeles, Dover Street Market in London, New York City, and Los Angeles, GR8 in Tokyo, and online.

== History ==
The founders met in their home state of Ohio before moving to Los Angeles to start the business. In particular, Ross noted that while studying at the Columbus College of Art & Design, he became a frequent consumer of LSD, which is often referred to or visually featured in Online Ceramics' products.

Both creators were fans of the band the Grateful Dead, and the company developed out of several early designs which were made and sold at Dead & Company tour locations in 2016.

Ross departed from the company in 2024. The same year, Funk filed a lawsuit against Ross. The company filed for Chapter 7 Bankruptcy in February 2025, but the case was dismissed in March 2025.

== Coverage and promotion ==
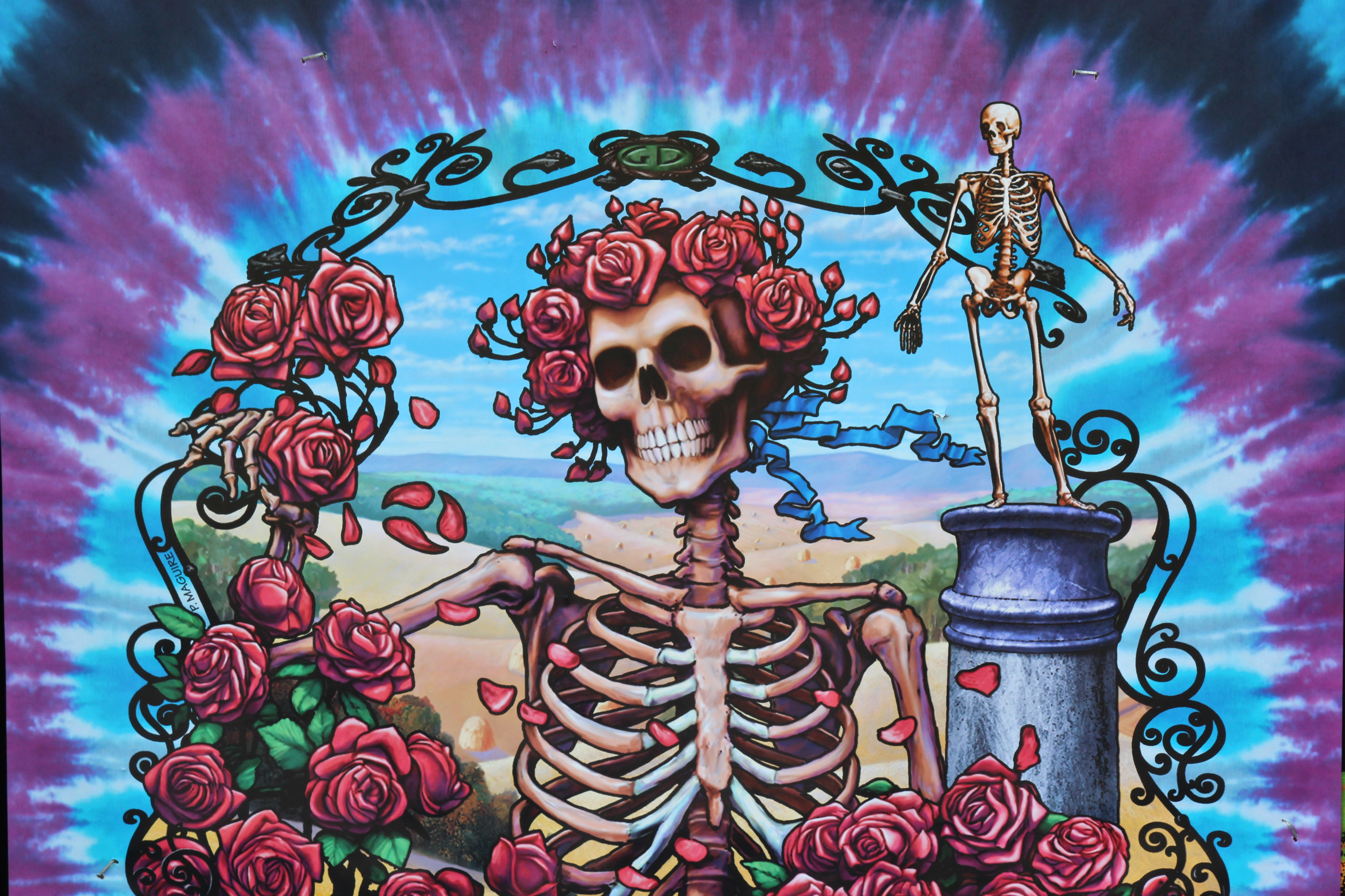
The iconography of the Grateful Dead, including tie-dye, skeletons, and flowers, that often feature in the work of Online Ceramics.

As covered by The New Yorker in 2018, the small batches of shirts and hoodies produced had become noteworthy in the streetwear community, observing: "The shirts frequently sell out—which only makes them more attractive to style mavens seeking to distinguish themselves from their peers."

The men's fashion and lifestyle magazine GQ interviewed Ross and Funk in 2017, noting that "their graphics are enormous and intricate, and include their own characters—goblins, jesters—along with druggie iconography and phrases that channel a sort of cosmic mindfulness."

The brand's products have also been worn publicly by celebrities such as Emily Ratajkowski, Kaia Gerber, and Jonah Hill. Much of the brand's promotional work occurs through its official Instagram, which has 300,000 followers as of October 2026.

== Collaborations ==
=== Commercial collaborations ===
Online Ceramics has a partnership with the independent entertainment company A24, producing promotional merchandise for the latter's media projects. The partnership was established after Ross and Funk saw the trailer for the Ari Aster film Hereditary, after which they decided to create unofficial merchandise for the film. After being connected to a creative director at A24 by GQ editor Will Welch, the collaboration was made official. This partnership has also extended to merchandise for the 2019 film Midsommar, Robert Eggers' films The VVitch and The Lighthouse, the 2019 Safdie Brothers film Uncut Gems, David Lowery's 2021 film The Green Knight, Rose Glass' films Saint Maud and Love Lies Bleeding, Ti West's X film trilogy, the 10th anniversary of the release of Spring Breakers, and the 2023 series The Curse.

In 2022, The North Face launched a collaboration with Online Ceramics to celebrate Earth Day. The company also released a collection collaborating with Heaven by Marc Jacobs later that year.

In 2025, the company collaborated with the publishing house Penguin Random House to release merchandise raising awareness for the rise of book banning in the United States.

In 2026, the company released a capsule in collaboration with Wikipedia to commemorate the latter's 25th anniversary, with a proportion of proceeds being donated to the Wikimedia Foundation.

=== Artist Collaborations ===
Online Ceramics have made a capsule set featuring the guru Ram Dass and his Netflix documentary Becoming Nobody. They have created merchandise for several Dead & Company tours, and have designed clothing to promote John Mayer's Sob Rock album. They have also collaborated with other musicians, such as SZA (for her 2023 SOS North America tour), Oneohtrix Point Never, Laraaji, Mystic 100's, Weyes Blood, David Grisman, 100 Gecs, André 3000, The Beatles (to celebrate the band's 60th anniversary of partnership with Capitol Records), as well as with the estates of Fela Kuti and Alice Coltrane.

== See Also ==
- The Grateful Dead
- Streetwear
- A24
- Dover Street Market
- Hippie
