= Tomorrow's Hits (The Men album) =

Studio album by the Men
- Released: 4 March 2014
- Recorded: 2013, Strange Weather studios
- Genres: Indie rock, punk rock
- Label: Sacred Bones Records

The Men chronology
New Moon (2013)	Tomorrow's Hits (2014)	Devil Music (2016)

Tomorrow's Hits is the fifth studio album by the Brooklyn punk rock band the Men released March 4, 2014 on Sacred Bones Records.

== Recording ==
=== Production ===
Work on Tomorrow's Hits first began during the winter of 2012. The album was recorded at Strange Weather studios and was recorded before New Moon, the band's fourth studio album, was released. The album's title was a tribute to the titles of compilation albums that were released during the 1960s. The term "Tomorrow's Hits" had also previously appeared in the liner notes for New Moon. The neon sign on the album's cover was designed by Rich Samis and Kevin Faulkner.

=== Music ===
The album mixes punk rock with classic rock influences. Artists that have been cited as influences includes Creedence Clearwater Revival, Tom Petty, Bruce Springsteen, Bob Seger and The Rolling Stones. The album also made heavy use of horns. "Another Night" is a blue-eyed soul song. "Pearly Gates" is a fast tempo song with blues influences. Writers have compared the track "Get What You Give" to Boston's "More Than a Feeling".

== Release ==
The album was first announced on December 3, 2013. The first single from the album, "Pearly Gates", was released January 8, 2014. A second single from the album, "Another Night", was released on February 3, 2014. A third single from the album, "Different Days", was released the next day. Tomorrow's Hits was streamed in its entirety on February 25, 2014. On March 5, 2014, a music video for "Pearly Gates" was released. The video, directed by Brian Chillemi, was influenced by road movies and features bikers, a police chase and a sacrificial cult.

== Reception ==
Professional ratings
Aggregate scores
Source	Rating
Metacritic	73/100
Review scores
Source	Rating
AllMusic	4/5 stars
Alternative Press	3.5/5 stars
The A.V. Club	B
Consequence of Sound	A
Drowned in Sound	8/10
Paste Magazine	8.3/10
Pitchfork	7.2/10
PopMatters	6/10
Rolling Stone	3/5 stars
Spin	8/10
Uncut	9/10

Tomorrow's Hits has received generally positive reviews. On Metacritic, the album has a score of 73 out of 100, indicating "generally favorable reviews".

Michael Madden of Consequence of Sound gave the album a grade of A, writing "Tomorrow's Hits doesn't boom like The Men's early material (namely, 2010’s Immaculada and 2011’s Leave Home), but it's more rousing instrumentally than last year's New Moon." Madden continued: "Let's face it: The Men have all the tools required to spur obsessive listeners." Paste's Ryan Prado also gave the album a positive review, writing "Tomorrow's Hits, is almost unfairly possessive of a foretelling title, seeing as how vanilla some of the songs can come off sounding. The record, however, is an accurate chronology of a working band's prolific devotion to feeding the muse." In another positive review, Spin's Jon Young wrote, "Given the stylistic zig-zagging, the Men can't claim a master plan, apart from keeping themselves entertained, which should suffice. For them, and for us." Jazz Monroe gave the album a grade of 8 out of 10, writing, "The real genius of Tomorrow's Hits is its shaking off not just fan expectations but the almighty shackles of credibility, innovation and, for want of a subtler term, corporate buzz-band etiquette."

Matthew Fiander of PopMatters gave the album a mixed review, writing "There's still a solid core to Tomorrow's Hits, one that cleans up the band's talents and puts them on display in innovative songs. Unfortunately, for every look forward on Tomorrow's Hits, there's another one still stuck in the past." Tiny Mix Tapes also gave the album a mixed review, writing that the album "[comes] across as methodic in whichever mirror you choose to view it in." The review continued: "It's their 'highest fidelity album yet,' but it actually being medium rare-fi in the grand relative scheme of the music fidelity scale seems boring." At Alternative Press, Robert Ham rated the album three-and-a-half stars out of five, saying that "The majority of the tracks on Tomorrow's Hits feel like they were cooked in the backyards of Laurel Canyon with ambling rhythms, the lilt of lap steel guitar and an air of stoned desperation lingering over it all like smog."

== Track listing ==
1. "Dark Waltz" - 5:13
2. "Get What You Give" - 3:20
3. "Another Night" - 5:28
4. "Different Days" - 4:31
5. "Sleepless" - 3:11
6. "Pearly Gates" - 6:16
7. "Settle Me Down" - 4:58
8. "Going Down" - 3:41
