= She Like Electric =

Studio album by Smoosh
- Released: September 2004
- Genre: Indie
- Length: 31:42
- Label: Pattern 25 Records
- Producer: Johnny Sangster

Smoosh chronology
Tomato Mistakes (2000)	She Like Electric (2004)	Free to Stay (2006)

She Like Electric is the debut album recorded by Seattle sister duo, Smoosh. They were twelve and ten years old at the time they recorded it. The Japanese release of this album features a fifteenth track called "Inner to the Outer".

== Track listing ==
She Like Electric
No.	Title	Length
1.	"Massive Cure"	1:59
2.	"It's Cold"	2:48
3.	"It's Not Your Day to Shine"	2:04
4.	"Rad"	1:51
5.	"Take It Away"	2:56
6.	"La Pump"	2:59
7.	"Pygmy Motorcycle"	2:40
8.	"About the Picture"	3:08
9.	"Bottlenose"	1:34
10.	"Make It Through"	3:11
11.	"I've Got My Own Problems to Fix"	1:14
12.	"The Quack"	0:49
13.	"To Walk Away From"	2:18
14.	"But Now I Know"	2:11
Total length:		31:42
