= Free to Stay =

Studio album by Smoosh
- Released: June 6, 2006
- Recorded: 2005, 2006
- Genre: Pop/indie rock
- Length: 37:08
- Label: Barsuk
- Producer: Jason McGerr

Smoosh chronology
She Like Electric (2004)	Free to Stay (2006)	Withershins (2010)

Free to Stay is the follow-up LP to Smoosh's 2004's release of She Like Electric. The album was released on June 6, 2006.

Professional ratings
Review scores
Source	Rating
Allmusic	link
Billboard	link
Obscure Sound	(7.8/10) link

== Track listing ==
Free to Stay
No.	Title	Length
1.	"Find a Way"	3:03
2.	"I Would Go"	3:09
3.	"Free to Stay"	2:51
4.	"Rock Song"	2:00
5.	"Waiting for Something"	3:07
6.	"Clap On"	3:26
7.	"Glider"	2:17
8.	"Gold"	3:54
9.	"Organ Talk"	2:14
10.	"She's Right"	3:47
11.	"This Is Not What We've Become"	3:25
12.	"Slower Than Gold"	3:41
Total length:		37:08
