= Open Your Heart (album) =

Studio album by The Men
- Released: 6 March 2012
- Recorded: Summer 2011
- Genre: Punk rock, indie rock, post-punk, shoegaze
- Length: 45:06
- Label: Sacred Bones

The Men chronology
Leave Home (2011)	Open Your Heart (2012)	New Moon (2013)

Open Your Heart is the third studio album by the Brooklyn punk rock band The Men, released March 6, 2012 on Sacred Bones Records. The album saw a change in sound for The Men, being less aggressive than the band's previous album Leave Home and incorporating influences from classic rock, country music and surf rock. The album received mostly positive reviews.

== Recording and release ==
Open Your Heart was recorded in the summer of 2011 at Python Patrol studio. Open Your Heart was almost finished when Leave Home, The Men's second album, was released. The album cover came from a stag magazine, with the vulgar elements in the background blacked-out.

The album was first announced on December 14, 2011. The first song released from the album, "Open Your Heart", premiered online on January 24, 2012. A second song from Open Your Heart, "Ex-Dreams", was released February 17, 2012.

== Musical styles ==
Open Your Heart has been described as more "toned down" and psychedelic than Leave Home. The album incorporated country music, doo-wop, krautrock and surf rock elements into the music. For specific bands, writers have cited Foo Fighters, MC5, The Replacements, Spacemen 3, Sonic Youth, No Age, Yo La Tengo, Led Zeppelin and Black Sabbath as artists of comparison. In an interview, the band said they were listening heavily to John Fahey, Leo Kottke, Cheap Trick, Big Star, Lou Reed and Bob Dylan's Street Legal while recording the album. Vocalist Mark Perro attributed Open Your Heart's new sound to the band having more time to write and record.

== Reception ==
Professional ratings
Aggregate scores
Source	Rating
AnyDecentMusic?	8.1/10
Metacritic	83/100
Review scores
Source	Rating
AllMusic	4/5 stars
The A.V. Club	A
The Guardian	4/5 stars
The Irish Times	4/5 stars
Mojo	3/5 stars
NME	8/10
Pitchfork	8.5/10
Rolling Stone	3.5/5 stars
Spin	9/10
Uncut	8/10

Open Your Heart has received generally positive reviews. On Metacritic, the album has a score of 83 out of 100, indicating "universal acclaim". Jason Heller of The A.V. Club wrote that "With Open Your Heart, The Men have taken that breath. And it's only made their hearts beat faster." Pitchfork's Ian Cohen gave the album a "Best New Music" designation, writing "Open Your Heart is smartly sequenced to metabolize genre and morph like a masterful DJ mix, subtly rationing out its true peaks even while seemingly going full-throttle throughout." Cohen concluded: "[I]f you bought their t-shirt, came to their show, raved about Leave Home on your Tumblr, or seek to carry on tradition by starting your own band, Open Your Heart is the Men thanking you in the best way possible." In another positive review, Rob Harvilla of Spin wrote "Open Your Heart improves the band's focus even as it widens its range, ditching the harrowing, hacking-death-cough stuff and reaching for something more… let's say 'pastoral.'"

Emma Sundstrom of PopMatters was more mixed towards the album, calling the track "Candy" "annoying" and the album's longer songs "hit and miss". Sundstrom concluded: "At the end of the day, the Men aren't quite all they're cracked up to be, but even a bitter cynic like me has to admit, this album is worth a listen. It's too watered down to stand the test of time, but right now, it hits the spot."

Pitchfork ranked Open Your Heart at number 30 on its list of the best album of 2012, with Ian Cohen writing: "It's risky to use their studio albums to say anything definitive about the Men at this point. So let's just forget about narratives and evolution and appreciate Open Your Heart as a record that makes them sound capable of doing whatever the hell they want. It cycles through barnstorming classic rawk, searing punk, beer-chugging country, and muscular krautrock. If you basically like any kind of music made with guitars, there's something for you here." The same website ranked the title track at number 40 on its list of the top 100 tracks of 2012. The album was listed at number 17 on Stereogum's list of top 50 albums of 2012.

== Track listing ==
All songs written by The Men.

1. "Turn It Around" – 3:55
2. "Animal" – 2:50
3. "Country Song" – 5:47
4. "Oscillation" – 7:20
5. "Please Don't Go Away" – 3:00
6. "Open Your Heart" – 3:40
7. "Candy" – 3:16
8. "Cube" – 2:25
9. "Presence" – 7:23
10. "Ex-Dreams" – 5:30

== Personnel ==
The following people contributed to Open Your Heart:

The Men

- Nick Chiericozzi
- Kevin Faulkner
- Chris Hansell
- Mark Perro
- Rich Samis

Additional personnel

- Ben Greenberg – engineering
- Josh Bonati – mastering
- Ryan Marino – inside photography
- Holly Overton – vocals

== Charts ==
Chart (2012)	Peak position
US Independent Albums (Billboard)	32
US Heatseekers Albums (Billboard)	8
US Top Rock Albums (Billboard)	47
