= Wild (Beach House song) =

Promotional single by Beach House

from the album Bloom
- Released: October 29, 2012
- Recorded: 2011
- Studio: Sonic Ranch (Tornillo, Texas)
- Genre: Dream pop; new wave
- Length: 4:58 (album version); 3:55 (radio edit)
- Label: Sub Pop; Bella Union
- Songwriter: Victoria Legrand
- Producers: Beach House; Chris Coady

Music video
- "Wild" on YouTube

"Wild" is a song by American dream pop band Beach House from their fourth studio album Bloom (2012). It was released as a promotional single on October 29, 2012, through Bella Union. "Wild" is the oldest song written for the album, being done by lead vocalist and songwriter Victoria Legrand while they were mixing their previous album Teen Dream (2010).

"Wild" received positive reviews from critics. The song peaked at number 52 on the Ultratip Bubbling Under chart for Belgium's Flanders region and was regularly performed while touring throughout 2012, with an additional live performance on Late Night with Jimmy Fallon in July 2012. An accompanying music video was released on November 14, 2012, which was directed by Johan Renck and features a compiled series of "intense moments".

== Background and composition ==
In 2009, Beach House began working on their third studio album, Teen Dream, when they eventually signed a label contract with Sub Pop, departing from Carpark Records, where they released their first two studio albums. Aside from the entire album being leaked on the internet that same year, it was released officially on January 26, 2010, through Sub Pop, garnering universal acclaim among several contemporary music critics. On March 8, 2012, a day after releasing the single "Myth" on their website, the duo officially announced their fourth studio album, Bloom, with "Wild" appearing as the second track.

According to guitarist Alex Scally, "Wild" was the earliest song written for Bloom and stated that it was written during the mixing process for Teen Dream. Like the rest of the tracks on the album, "Wild", was recorded within a nine-week period in 2011 at Sonic Ranch in Tornillo, Texas. A mid-tempo track reminiscent of new wave music, "Wild" runs at a length of four minutes and 58 seconds. It is also centered around a tambourine "boom-tish" drum beat, "epic shoegazing" guitars and a "buzzing" synth. The track relies on a substantial amount of reverb, with Legrand ending the choruses in the track with "Go on pretending".

== Release, reception and live performances ==
"Wild" was released as the second track from Beach House's fourth studio album Bloom on May 15, 2012. It was later released as a promotional single on October 29, 2012, by Bella Union. On the issue dated November 3, 2012, the song appeared at number 52, as a Tip, on the Ultratip Bubbling Under chart for Belgium's Flanders region. On November 14, 2012, the band released the accompanying music video for "Wild", which was directed by Johan Renck. Described as "a series of intense, violent, sexual, and sad moments", the video is set in a "dank, realistic" setting and features an isolative narrative. In their review on Bloom, Lindsay Zoladz from Pitchfork named "Wild" as one of their best tracks to date, additionally calling it a "brazen [and] epic" composition. Josh Becker of Beats Per Minute felt that the song was "a little more analog than [they are] used to" from the band's catalog, drawing comparisons to the musical style of bands such as M83 and Peaking Lights. Stu Lewis from The Skinny said that the track is "successful in pushing for a bigger sound while standing up to its knees in reverb".

Before its official release, "Wild" was performed during a concert in 2011. The song was included in the setlist for their live set at the Bowery Ballroom in New York City on May 15, 2012, the same day Bloom was released, where Daniel Franz performed the live drums throughout. On June 2, 2012, Beach House performed the song at Primavera Sound 2012, with their overall set consisting of windmills and a star-lit background. On July 24, 2012, they performed the song, along with "Wishes", on Late Night with Jimmy Fallon. On February 4, 2013, the duo released Forever Still, a short film containing performances of four songs from the album, including "Wild", filmed throughout El Paso and Tornillo, Texas, where they recorded Bloom.

== Track listing ==
- UK radio edit
1. "Wild" (radio edit) – 3:55

== Personnel ==
Credits adapted from liner notes of Bloom.

Beach House

- Victoria Legrand
- Alex Scally

Additional musicians

- Daniel Franz – live drums and percussion

Production

- Chris Coady – production, engineering, mixing
- Beach House – production
- Manuel Calderon – assistant engineering
- Brooks Harlan – engineering
- Phil Joly – assistant engineering
- Joe LaPorta – mastering

== Charts ==
Chart performance for "Wild"
Chart (2012)	Peak position
Belgium (Ultratip Bubbling Under Flanders)	52
