= Committed to the Crime =

EP by Chaos Chaos
- Released: October 7, 2014
- Genre: Indie pop, Electro pop

Chaos Chaos chronology
S (2012)	Committed to the Crime (2014)	Chaos Chaos (2018)

Committed to the Crime is the second album released by Chaos Chaos (formerly Smoosh). It was released in 2014.

== Background ==
After adopting the name Chaos Chaos in 2012, the band soon developed a synth-pop sound.

== Reception ==
Vice's music website, Noisey called the track "Breaker" off the album, "powerful" song, as well as "another example of their precocious talent and the sisters ability to craft hooks that are both instantaneous and timeless." Spin called the track a "highlight" from the album.

== In popular culture ==
"Do You Feel It?" was notably featured in "Auto Erotic Assimilation," the third episode of the second season of Rick and Morty.

== Track listing ==
Committed to the Crime
No.	Title	Length
1.	"Love"	3:43
2.	"Breaker"	4:12
3.	"Do You Feel It?"	4:10
4.	"West Side"	3:32
5.	"Monsters"	3:25
6.	"Better"	4:01
Total length:		23:03
