= Mercy (The Men album) =

Studio album by the Men
- Released: February 14, 2020
- Length: 35:37
- Label: Sacred Bones

The Men chronology
| Drift (2018) | Mercy (2020) | New York City (2023) |

Professional ratings
Aggregate scores
| Source | Rating |
|---|---|
| AnyDecentMusic? | 6.6/10 |
| Metacritic | 67/100 |
Review scores
| Source | Rating |
| AllMusic | 3/5 stars |
| MusicOMH | 4/5 stars |
| Pitchfork | 7.2/10 |
| Slant Magazine | 3.5/5 stars |

Mercy is the eighth studio album by American punk rock band the Men. It was released on February 14, 2020 under Sacred Bones Records.

== Release ==
The announcement of the album, along with the first single "Children All Over the World", was released on January 9, 2020. The second single from the album, "Breeze" was released on January 30, 2020.

== Critical reception ==
Mercy was met with "generally favorable" reviews from critics. At Metacritic, which assigns a weighted average rating out of 100 to reviews from mainstream publications, this release received an average score of 67, based on 6 reviews. Aggregator Album of the Year gave the release a 66 out of 100 based on a critical consensus of 6 reviews.

== Track listing ==
Mercy track listing
| No. | Title | Length |
|---|---|---|
| 1. | "Cool Water" | 5:13 |
| 2. | "Wading in Dirty Water" | 10:29 |
| 3. | "Fallin' Thru" | 3:59 |
| 4. | "Children All Over the World" | 5:53 |
| 5. | "Call the Dr." | 3:53 |
| 6. | "Breeze" | 2:54 |
| 7. | "Mercy" | 3:16 |
