= Drift (The Men album) =

Studio album by the Men
- Released: March 2, 2018
- Studio: Serious Business Records Studios
- Length: 35:01
- Label: Sacred Bones Records
- Producer: Travis Harrison

The Men chronology
Devil Music (2016)	Drift (2018)	Mercy (2020)

Professional ratings
Aggregate scores
Source	Rating
AnyDecentMusic?	6.2/10
Metacritic	63/100
Review scores
Source	Rating
AllMusic	3/5 stars
Clash	8/10
DIY	4/5 stars
Exclaim!	5/10
God Is in the TV	8/10
MusicOMH	3/5 stars
Paste	7.2/10
Pitchfork	6.6/10
PopMatters	7/10
Under the Radar	4/10

Drift is the seventh studio album by American punk rock band the Men. It was released on March 2, 2018 under Sacred Bones Records.

== Production ==
The album was recorded at Serious Business Records's studios with the help of musician and producer Travis Harrison.

== Release ==
The album was first announced on January 10, 2018. The first single to be announced "Maybe I'm Crazy" was released on January 9, 2018. The second single from the album, "Rose on Top of the World" was released on January 31, 2018. The third single "Killed Someone" was released on February 22, 2018.

== Critical reception ==
Drift was met with "generally favorable" reviews from critics. At Metacritic, which assigns a weighted average rating out of 100 to reviews from mainstream publications, this release received an average score of 63, based on 18 reviews. Aggregator Album of the Year gave the release a 64 out of 100 based on a critical consensus of 18 reviews.

== Track listing ==
Drift track listing
No.	Title	Length
1.	"Maybe I'm Crazy"	4:10
2.	"When I Held You in My Arms"	4:58
3.	"Secret Light"	4:16
4.	"Rose on Top of the World"	4:28
5.	"So High"	3:25
6.	"Killed Someone"	2:29
7.	"Sleep"	2:45
8.	"Final Prayer"	5:45
9.	"Come to Me"	2:45
