= New Moon (The Men album) =

Studio album by the Men
- Released: 5 March 2013
- Recorded: 2012
- Genre: Punk rock
- Length: 46:05
- Label: Sacred Bones Records

The Men chronology
Open Your Heart (2012)	New Moon (2013)	Tomorrow's Hits (2014)

New Moon is the fourth studio album by the Brooklyn punk rock band the Men, released March 5, 2013 on Sacred Bones Records. The album continued a trend set by the band's previous album Open Your Heart, with more melodic songs and less noise rock influences. The album incorporated influences from psychedelic music, Americana and country rock. New Moon received mostly positive reviews, with some critics praising the album's more accessible sound, while others criticizing the album's lack of focus.

== Recording ==
=== Production ===
On April 28, 2012, The Men announced that they were going to record a follow up to Open Your Heart, to be released in the spring of 2013. The band recorded the album at Big Indian, New York in a cabin in the Catskill Mountains. Regarding the album's recording location, drummer Rich Samis said, "We were touring a bunch before that [..] So to go and live in this house wasn't that radical of an idea. It wasn't like, 'Oh my God, this is so crazy.' It was natural." Most of the songs on New Moon were recorded in one or two takes. During New Moon's recording session, the band also recorded a six-song EP titled Campfire Songs, which was a collection of songs The Men recorded by a campfire.

In a press release, the band described New Moon as their "most intensely personal" album yet. The band elaborated on that description with Consequence of Sound, saying that New Moon was personal because it was more "stripped down" and "a little more naked" than previous Men records.

=== Music ===
Whereas The Men's first two albums, Immaculada and Leave Home, were noted for their abrasive sound, New Moon continued the down the path established by the Men's 2012 album Open Your Heart, with more melodic songs and less noise rock influences. The album incorporated country rock, classic rock, psychedelic music and Americana elements into the album. For specific artists, writers have cited Neil Young, MC5, Hüsker Dü, Yo La Tengo, Dusty Springfield, The Replacements and Dinosaur Jr. as influences. In an interview with The Village Voice, the Men claimed that Tom Petty was a major influence on the album.

== Release ==
On January 9, 2013, New Moon's title and release date was announced. The album's lead single, "Electric", premiered online the same day. On January 28, 2013, a music video for the song "Electric" was released. The music video featured The Men playing the song at a June 2012 show in London. On February 20, 2013, a second single from the album, "I Saw Her Face", premiered on Entertainment Weekly's website. On February 26, 2013, New Moon was streamed in its entirety on Pitchfork. On March 13, 2013, a music video for the song "I Saw Her Face" was released.

== Reception ==
Professional ratings
Aggregate scores
Source	Rating
Metacritic	76/100
Review scores
Source	Rating
AllMusic	4/5 stars
The A.V. Club	B+
Consequence of Sound	4.5/5 stars
Drowned in Sound	2/5 stars
NME	8/10
Pitchfork	8.2/10
PopMatters	8/10
Slant Magazine	2/5 stars
Tiny Mix Tapes	3.5/5 stars

New Moon has received mostly positive reviews, though initial critical reaction to the album was more mixed compared to the band's previous album Open Your Heart. On Metacritic, the album has a score of 76 out of 100, indicating "generally favorable reviews".

Jason Heller of The A.V. Club gave the album a grade of B+, writing "For now, though, New Moon stands as it is: a homey, gut-warming batch of tunes that erratically juggle nostalgia, craft, and ass-kicking abandon." Consequence of Sound's Dan Caffrey praised the album's more accessible sound, writing "Sacrificing recklessness is different from sacrificing passion, and New Moon cements The Men as one of the most exciting rock acts today, no matter who they're listening to or, most importantly, who they're redefining." Gregory Heaney of AllMusic also wrote positively of the album's sound, writing "While on the surface it's easy to see New Moon simply as a band softening its approach, the melodic evolution feels more and more like the Men are trying to separate themselves from an ever-growing sea of second-wave noise rock bands, willingly abandoning a burgeoning trend before they're forever anchored to it. Luckily, the Men have enough versatility that they'll hopefully be paddling on long after the ship has sunk." Matt Messana of PopMatters described New Moon as "one of those excellent albums that's going to divide opinion, especially among long-standing fans of the band."

Robert Leedham of Drowned in Sound, on the other hand, described New Moon as "an infuriating collection of songs", writing "its complete disregard towards any sort of structure or cohesion is so overpowering, you'll be baffled how the Brooklyn-based five piece cobbled their fourth record together at all." Slant Magazine's Jordan Mainzer also criticized the album's lack of focus, writing "this lack of a sensible sequence strips New Moon of the convergence, endurance, and catharsis that characterizes the Men's best work. Four albums in four years is an impressive feat, but the band has prioritized quantity over quality."

== Track listing ==
All songs written by The Men.

1. "Open the Door" - 3:00
2. "Half Angel Half Light" - 3:18
3. "Without a Face" - 2:46
4. "The Seeds" - 4:18
5. "I Saw Her Face" - 5:22
6. "High and Lonesome" - 2:42
7. "The Brass" - 3:22
8. "Electric" - 3:16
9. "I See No One" - 3:23
10. "Birdsong" - 4:14
11. "Freaky" - 2:25
12. "Supermoon" - 7:59

== Personnel ==
The following people contributed to New Moon:

=== The Men ===
- Nick Chiericozzi - Guitar, Harmonica, Mandolin, Vocals
- Kevin Faulkner - Bass, Lap Steel Guitar, Photography, Vocals
- Ben Greenberg - Engineer, Guitar, Organ, Piano, Vocals
- Mark Perro - Guitar, Harmonica, Piano, Vocals
- Rich Samis - Design, Drums, Percussion

=== Additional personnel ===
- Josh Bonati - Mastering
- Kyle Keays-Hagerman - Electronics, Engineer
