= Chaos Chaos (album) =

Studio album by Chaos Chaos
- Released: May 15, 2018
- Genre: Pop; indie; synthpop; disco
- Length: 38:16
- Label: Independent

Chaos Chaos chronology
Committed to the Crime (2014)	Chaos Chaos (2018)

Singles from Chaos Chaos
- 1. "Dripping with Fire" Released: September 29, 2017; 2. "On Turning 23" Released: November 15, 2017; 3. "Pink Politics" Released: April 12, 2018

Chaos Chaos is a studio album released in 2018 by the American indie-pop band Chaos Chaos. This album is their third release since changing their name from Smoosh in 2012, and it marks their first full-length since Withershins in 2010.

== Background ==
Band members Asy and Chloe Saavedra announced on Facebook in December 2016 that they were working on a new album. They released two singles from the album on iTunes and Spotify in late 2017. "Dripping with Fire" was released on September 29, 2017, with a music video directed by Stephanie Dimiskovski which was released on VEVO and YouTube. "On Turning 23" followed on November 15, 2017, with a music video directed by Maia Saavedra, the younger sister of the band members and a former collaborator. These songs and videos explore themes of sisterhood, estrangement, and growing up.

In April 2018, the band released a music video for the album's third single, "Pink Politics," which was uploaded to their YouTube channel on April 12. Directed by Fredgy Noël and shot in public on Asy and Chloe's iPhones. Asy revealed that the song was written the day after the 2016 presidential election, and that the song and video are a response.

Chaos Chaos began headlining their first-ever national tour on April 12 to promote the album, which was released on May 15, 2018.

On October 16, 2018, the band announced a deluxe version of the album with three new tracks, initially made available only on their Bandcamp page. It has since been made available on other platforms as well.

== Track listing ==
Chaos Chaos
No.	Title	Length
1.	"Figure It Out"	3:17
2.	"Pink Politics"	3:45
3.	"Blue"	2:59
4.	"Dripping with Fire"	4:27
5.	"Emotion"	4:04
6.	"Berlin"	3:56
7.	"Don't Leave Me Hanging"	4:19
8.	"Värmland"	4:09
9.	"A Greater Fall"	3:29
10.	"On Turning 23"	3:51
Total length:		38:16

Deluxe edition
No.	Title	Length
1.	"Figure It Out"	3:17
2.	"Pink Politics"	3:45
3.	"Blue"	2:59
4.	"Dripping with Fire"	4:27
5.	"Emotion"	4:04
6.	"Berlin"	3:56
7.	"Don't Leave Me Hanging"	4:19
8.	"Animal Voice Memo"	0:38
9.	"Värmland"	4:09
10.	"2008"	3:15
11.	"Big Red Shoes"	3:59
12.	"A Greater Fall"	3:29
13.	"On Turning 23"	3:51
Total length:		46:08
