= Withershins (album) =

Studio album by Smoosh
- Released: June 29, 2010
- Recorded: 2008, 2009
- Genre: Pop, indie rock
- Length: 50:32
- Label: Independent
- Producer: Michael Lerner, Jackson Long

Smoosh chronology
Free To Stay (2006)	Withershins (2010)	S (2012)

Professional ratings
Review scores
Source	Rating
Soundscape Magazine	(9/10)

Withershins is the follow-up LP to Smoosh's 2006 release of Free To Stay. The album was released on June 29, 2010. It was not released on any official record label, but independently via internet distribution site bandcamp.com and is available for free download. It is also available on iTunes with its original title, The World's Not Bad. The album was first released in 2008, and again in 2010 as (Smoosh reissue), with the omission of the song "He Will Always Come Back".

== Track listing ==
Withershins
No.	Title	Length
1.	"Finnerödja"	5:27
2.	"We Are Our Own Lies"	5:03
3.	"Promises"	4:58
4.	"The World's Not Bad"	4:54
5.	"The Line"	4:33
6.	"Dark Shine"	5:18
7.	"Great Skies"	3:15
8.	"In the Fall"	3:37
9.	"Aarplane Song"	4:11
10.	"Call of the Mid-Afternoon"	4:33
11.	"Bridge No. 219242"	4:43
Total length:		50:32
