= Mystic 100's =

American rock band

Milk Music
- Origin: Olympia, Washington, U.S.
- Genres: Punk rock; indie rock; alternative rock
- Years active: 2008–present
- Labels: Fat Possum; Perennial
- Members: Alex Coxen; Joe Rutter; Dave Harris; Abby Dahlquist; Travis Coster; Charles Waring
- Website: milkmusic.us

Milk Music is an American rock band from Olympia, Washington.

== History ==
The band's first release was a self-titled demo tape, of which only 300 copies were made. The cassette was released independently in 2009. These were followed by 2010's Beyond Living EP, which was released independently and in part through Perennial Records; 2011's Violence Now split-single, released on flexi-disc by Perennial, featuring "White Light" by Carrie Keith (of Gun Outfit) as the b-side; and the Almost Live cassette tape, featuring a performance on Brian Turner's WFMU radio show, released independently in 2012. The band's first full-length LP, Cruise Your Illusion, was released on April 2, 2013. Four years later, on March 15, 2017, the long-awaited second full-length LP, Mystic 100's, was officially released on Dom America.

In the spring of 2013, the band toured South America with Merchandise and Destruction Unit. The band also performed in Pitchfork Music Festival and Primavera Sound festival in 2012.

In 2023, the band announced they had changed their name to Mystic 100's, after their 2017 album of the same name. They also announced a new album, titled On a Micro Diet, which was released on March 31, 2023, on the label Listening House.

== Musical style ==
The band's music is often compared to Hüsker Dü, Meat Puppets, and The Wipers, all of which they are influenced by. The band's other influences include Black Flag, Neil Young, Sonic Youth, The Velvet Underground, The Rolling Stones, The Gun Club, Creedence Clearwater Revival, Townes Van Zandt and Jimi Hendrix. The band's music is characterized by its fuzzy and melodic guitars, and lo-fi aesthetics, which can be likened to late-60's acid rock, 70's punk and hard rock, and 80's SST Records releases. The band has also occasionally been labeled as "grunge", a label which the frontman Alex Coxen adamantly dismisses.

== Discography ==
Studio albums

- Cruise Your Illusion (2013, Fat Possum Records)
- Mystic 100's (2017, Dom America)
- On a Micro Diet (2023, Listening House)

EPs and singles

- Beyond Living (2010, released independently)
- NUTS! #6, split album with Carrie Keith (2010, Perennial Records)

Demos

- Milk Music demo tape (2009, released independently)

Live albums

- Almost Live (2012, released independently)
- Live - April Fools Day | Tempe, AZ (2013, Ascetic House)
