= The Men (punk band) =

American rock band

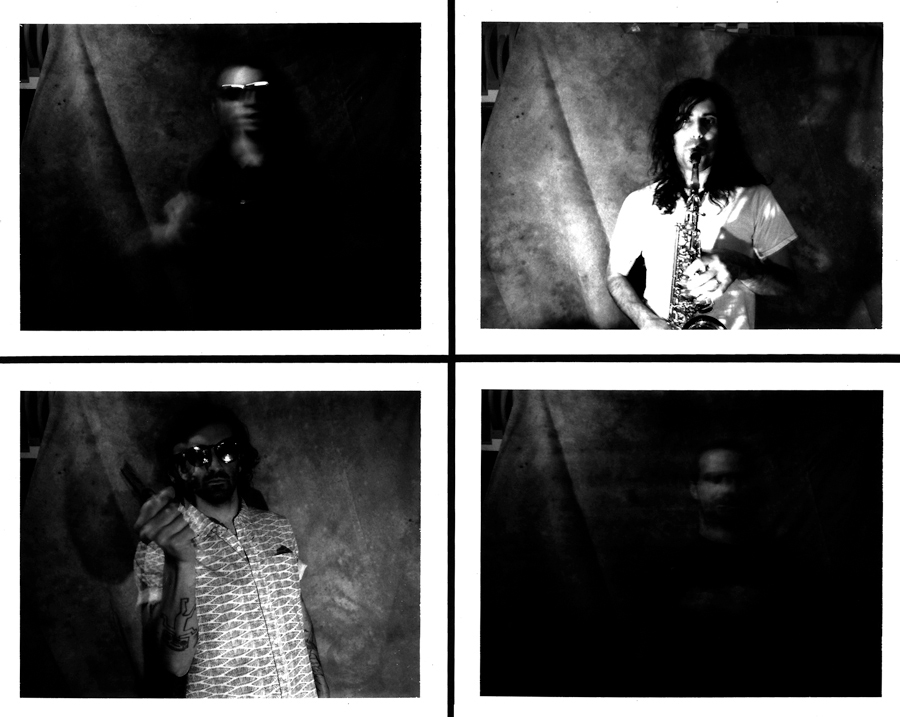

Background information
- Origin: Brooklyn, New York, U.S.
- Genres: Punk rock; post-hardcore; post-punk; Americana; noise rock
- Years active: 2008–present
- Label: Sacred Bones
- Members: Nick Chiericozzi; Mark Perro; Rich Samis; Kevin Faulkner
- Past members: Chris Hansell; Ben Greenberg
- Website: wearethemen.blogspot.com

The Men are a rock band from Brooklyn, formed in 2008. The band consists of Mark Perro (vocals, guitar, keys), Nick Chiericozzi (vocals, guitar, saxophone), Rich Samis (drums), and Kevin Faulkner (bass).

The band has produced ten studio albums. The Men's first two albums, Immaculada (2010) and Leave Home (2011), were noted for their abrasive, noise rock sound. The band gained recognition for their third album, Open Your Heart (2012), which was released to mostly positive reviews, including a Best New Music designation from Pitchfork. Open Your Heart was also noted for being more accessible than the previous two albums, incorporating influences from country music and surf rock. The band's follow-up albums, New Moon (2013) and Tomorrow's Hits (2014), continued down the path set by Open Your Heart, with more melodic songs and fewer noise-rock influences.

== History ==
=== Formation and Leave Home (2008-11) ===
The Men was formed by Nick Chiericozzi, Chris Hansell, and Mark Perro in 2008 in Brooklyn. After recording a demo tape and a 12" EP, they self-released their first album, Immaculada, in 2010 and their first widely available album, Leave Home, on Sacred Bones Records in 2011. Leave Home received mostly positive reviews, with one critic describing the album as "one of the most gut-punched and brain-addled rock records to arrive in quite some time." Later in 2011, Ben Greenberg, who engineered Leave Home, replaced bassist Chris Hansell after Hansell left the band.

=== Open Your Heart (2012) ===
The Men released their follow-up album, Open Your Heart, on March 6, 2012. Considered more accessible than Leave Home, the album incorporated surf rock, country music and pop structures. Open Your Heart received critical acclaim, including a Best New Music designation from Pitchfork. One critic wrote, "With Open Your Heart, The Men have taken that breath. And it's only made their hearts beat faster."

The band performed at the 2012 South by Southwest music festival.

Open Your Heart was the last record to feature bass player Chris Hansell.

The song "Turn It Around" was featured in a Rockstar Games video game, "Grand Theft Auto V", on the Indie Rock station, "Vinewood Boulevard Radio", in Exclusive to Next Gen Editions.

=== New Moon (2013) ===
The Men released their fourth full-length album, New Moon, on March 5, 2013. The album, which was recorded in Big Indian, New York, continued the down the path established by Open Your Heart, incorporating more classic and country rock influences and fewer noise rock elements. One critic described the album's sound as "akin to Dinosaur Jr. on a serious Tom Petty kick."

Compared to Open Your Heart, critical reaction was more mixed for New Moon. One of the main criticisms directed at New Moon was the album's lack of focus and cohesion. However, the album received mostly positive reviews, with one writer describing New Moon as "one of those excellent albums that's going to divide opinion, especially among long-standing fans of the band."

The Men released Campfire Songs EP on October 15, 2013. The EP was recorded around a campfire in Upstate New York during the band's recording session for New Moon.

=== Tomorrow's Hits (2014) & Dream Police LP ===
On December 3, 2013, the band announced their fifth studio album, Tomorrow's Hits. The album was released March 4, 2014 and was recorded by Ben Greenberg at Strange Weather studio in Brooklyn. Like their previous two albums, Tomorrow's Hits mixed punk rock and classic rock influences. That same day, the band shared a video for the song "Pearly Gates". On November 10, 2014, Nick Chiericozzi and Mark Perro released an LP on Sacred Bones Records entitled Hypnotized as Dream Police.

=== Devil Music (2016) ===
On September 12, 2016, the band announced their sixth album, Devil Music.

== Musical style ==
The Men's music has been described as post-hardcore, punk rock, neo-psychedelia and post-punk. Influences for the Men include the Replacements, Buzzcocks, Fugazi and the Velvet Underground. For the band's third and fourth full-length albums (Open Your Heart and New Moon), the band incorporated influences from country music, classic rock, Americana, doo-wop and surf rock. Nick Chiericozzi attributed the band's changing sound to their touring, saying "You start to listen to different stuff; it changes a lot because we were touring a lot. We were going to places like the UK and all over the world. You can't help but not be changed by that."

== Band members ==
Current Members

- Nick Chiericozzi - vocals, guitar, saxophone (2008–present)
- Mark Perro - vocals, guitar, keys (2008–present); drums (2008–2011)
- Rich Samis - drums (2011–present)
- Kevin Faulkner - bass, lap steel (2011–present)

Former members

- Chris Hansell - vocals, bass (2008-2011)
- Ben Greenberg - vocals, bass, guitar (2011–2014)

== Discography ==
=== Albums ===
- Immaculada (2010), We Are the Men Records / Deranged
- Leave Home (2011), Sacred Bones
- Open Your Heart (2012), Sacred Bones
- New Moon (2013), Sacred Bones
- Tomorrow's Hits (2014), Sacred Bones
- Devil Music (2016), We Are the Men Records
- Drift (2018), Sacred Bones
- Mercy (2020), Sacred Bones
- New York City (2023), Fuzz Club Records
- Buyer Beware (2025), Fuzz Club Records

=== EPs ===
- We Are the Men (2009), self-released
- Campfire Songs (2013), Sacred Bones
- Fuzz Club Session (2023), Fuzz Club
- Manhattan Fire (2024), Fuzz Club

=== Singles ===
- "Think" b/w "Gates of Steel" (2011)
- "Jennifer" b/w "New Pop", Matador Singles Club
- "Electric" b/w "Water Babies" (2013), Sacred Bones

=== Cassettes ===
- "Captain Ahab" b/w "Wasted" (2010)
- Split w/ Nomos (2010)
