= Obscure Sound =

- Obscure Sound's logo
- Website type: MP3 blog
- Available in: English
- Creator: Mike Mineo
- Website: www.obscuresound.com
- Launched: 2006; 20 years ago

Obscure Sound is an MP3 blog launched in the mid-2000s by Mike Mineo. The website is updated daily with articles and reviews covering a range of musical genres, including indie rock, indie folk and electronica.

== Content ==
Obscure Sound began as a small mp3 blog in February 2006. Before launching Obscure Sound, founder Mike Mineo wrote for PopMatters and Stylus Magazine. The website's noted focus on music that is "obscure" is outlined in its mission statement, which states a preference to feature "artists you’ve never heard of before." As such, New York Times journalist Jon Pareles identified that Obscure Sound "gather[s] hard-to-find songs for listeners to download directly." Similar to other online music publications, Obscure Sound publishes reviews, interviews, videos, editorials, and forums.

In some cases, Obscure Sound has premiered underground music that later becomes popular. For example, following a feature published by Obscure Sound in 2010, The Guardian featured Canadian electronica artist Grimes as their feature "New Band of the Week" in 2011. The Guardian quoted Obscure Sound in their description of Grimes for her "late-night driving songs, hangover antidotes, [and] exotic lullabies."

== Accolades ==
Obscure Sound has been featured in many publications and media worldwide. In addition to the New York Times and The Guardian, Obscure Sound has also been featured in the Boston Globe, The Toronto Star, The Independent, The Observer, BBC Radio 1, New York Magazine and VH1’s "Best Week Ever." In 2012, CD Baby included Obscure Sound on its list of "The Top 100 Must-Follow Music Resources on Twitter." In 2013, Refinery29 included Obscure Sound on its list of "The Best Music Blogs That Aren't Pitchfork." When NME printed its final issue in March 2018, Descrier News published a list of alternative "magazines, blogs, and zines that have replaced [NME]," which included Obscure Sound alongside other online music publications.
