= Thank Your Lucky Stars (Beach House album) =

Studio album by Beach House
- Released: October 16, 2015
- Recorded: November 2014–January 2015
- Studios: Studio in the Country (Bogalusa, Louisiana)
- Genre: Dream pop
- Length: 40:51
- Labels: Sub Pop; Bella Union
- Producers: Beach House; Chris Coady

Beach House chronology
Depression Cherry (2015)	Thank Your Lucky Stars (2015)	B-Sides and Rarities (2017)

Thank Your Lucky Stars is the sixth studio album by American dream pop duo Beach House. It was released on October 16, 2015, by Sub Pop in North America, Bella Union in Europe, and Mistletone Records in Australia. The album was released less than two months after their fifth studio album, Depression Cherry. It was co-produced by the duo and Chris Coady, being the duo's fourth full-length release with Coady as producer.

Simultaneously with Depression Cherry, Thank Your Lucky Stars was recorded at Studio in the Country in Bogalusa, Louisiana, from November 2014 to January 2015, though songs for the latter were written after those of the former. Described by the band as "not a companion to Depression Cherry, or a surprise, or b-sides", Thank Your Lucky Stars was unexpectedly announced eight days before its release via the band's Twitter account. It received mostly positive reviews from critics. It debuted at number 39 on the US Billboard 200 chart, selling 10,000 copies within its first week.

== Background and recording ==
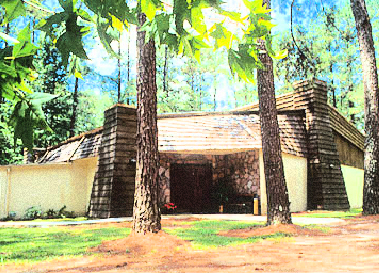
Along with Depression Cherry, Thank Your Lucky Stars was recorded from November 2014 to January 2015 at Studio in the Country. (pictured)

Following the release of and extensive touring for Bloom (2012), which garnered critical praise, Beach House released their fifth studio album, Depression Cherry, on August 28, 2015. Less than two months following its release, the band announced their sixth studio album, Thank Your Lucky Stars, on their Twitter account, adding that it would be released on October 16, that same year. They described it as "not a companion to Depression Cherry, or a surprise, or b-sides".

All of the album's songs were written after those of Depression Cherry, although both albums were recorded simultaneously at Studio in the Country in Bogalusa, Louisiana, and mixed at Sonic Ranch in Tornillo, Texas. In contrast to this, the band felt that the records should be seen as distinct unconnected works. Despite this, the words "Thank Your Lucky Stars" were etched in the runout of the vinyl pressings of Depression Cherry. The cover art is a photograph of Victoria Legrand's mother taken in the late 1950s.

== Promotion and release ==
Similarly done to three of the songs from Depression Cherry, three songs from Thank Your Lucky Stars ("Majorette", "She's So Lovely" and "One Thing") were published on the band's website, though were only accessible through the "Single Finder" feature. Thank Your Lucky Stars was released on October 16, 2015, through Sub Pop in North America. In the United States, it debuted at number four on the Top Rock Albums chart, with 10,000 copies sold in its first week. It was the band's second release of 2015, following Depression Cherry, which debuted at number one on the Top Rock Albums chart after its release on August 28.

== Reception ==
Professional ratings
Aggregate scores
Source	Rating
AnyDecentMusic?	7.5/10
Metacritic	80/100
Review scores
Source	Rating
AllMusic	4/5 stars
The A.V. Club	B+
Consequence of Sound	B+
Mojo	4/5 stars
The Observer	3/5 stars
Pitchfork	8.1/10
PopMatters	9/10
Rolling Stone	3.5/5 stars
Spin	8/10
Uncut	8/10

Thank Your Lucky Stars was released to highly positive reviews. At Metacritic, which assigns a normalized rating out of 100 to reviews from mainstream critics, the album has an average score of 80, based on 18 reviews.

Jayson Greene of Pitchfork suggested the songs took on a "darker edge" than those from Depression Cherry, judging the songs to feel smaller by having stripped away the typical cathedral-like reverb from the group's previous albums. Greene likened the mood of the songs to Beach House's material before they joined Sub Pop, describing the feeling as "pneumatic, dusty, like they are pulling a blanket around themselves in a heatless attic to ward off a threatening chill." Although the "joy and comfort have vanished" from the material, Greene claimed that that album is "still undeniably a Beach House album, a familiar mix of warm tones and chilly sentiments." Ultimately, Greene welcomed the addition to the band's repertoire, but suggested that a new album so soon created a dissonance that feels like "too much of a good thing."

In a review from The A.V. Club, Corbin Reiff described the album as "most assuredly a continuation of many of the same motifs and hallmarks of the group's last release." Reiff hailed the band's craft, arguing that "Beach House has mastered the art of space by this point and seems to have an instinct for how long to drag out a keyboard melody or a guitar line before bringing in another element to keep things from bogging down." Although he felt Depression Cherry and Thank Your Lucky Stars were similar in motif, Reiff praised the band's decision to separate the songs, rather than tack them onto the former. For Reiff, Thank Your Lucky Stars supports itself as a singular entity where "the full sonic and emotional weight is tremendous."

Writing for Rolling Stone, Meagan Fredette gave praise to Victoria Legrand's vocals stating that "her singing on Thank Your Lucky Stars feels more playful than usual, a welcome lightness that comes across from the first moments of "Majorette," the album's opener." "Elegy to the Void" was also singled out as a highlight of the record with Fredette describing the track as "the album’s crown jewel" and "as good a summation as any of what Beach House does best." Emphasising the maturity of the record in comparison to the band's debut, she suggests that "Like all their albums, this one is full of songs made for dreaming of a bygone love, or humming quietly to a new one."

=== Accolades ===
Publication	Accolade	Year	Rank
Pitchfork	Readers' Top 50 Albums	2015	25
Pitchfork	Readers' Most Underrated Albums	2015	4

== Track listing ==
All lyrics written by Victoria Legrand; all music composed and arranged by Beach House.

No.	Title	Length
1.	"Majorette"	4:00
2.	"She's So Lovely"	4:22
3.	"All Your Yeahs"	3:48
4.	"One Thing"	5:36
5.	"Common Girl"	3:06
6.	"The Traveller"	4:04
7.	"Elegy to the Void"	6:30
8.	"Rough Song"	5:14
9.	"Somewhere Tonight"	4:14
Total length:		40:54

== Personnel ==
Beach House

- Alex Scally – keyboards (tracks 1, 3, 4, 7–9), guitar and bass (all tracks)
- Victoria Legrand – keyboards (tracks 2, 5, 6, 8), bass guitar (tracks 1, 3), guitar (tracks 4, 7)

Additional musicians

- Graham Hill – live drums and percussion (except tracks 7 and 8)
- Chris Bear – percussion (tracks 7 and 8)

Production

- Beach House – production, mixing
- Chris Coady – production
- David Tolomei – engineering
- Jay Wesley – assistant engineering
- Shane Wesley – "all around dude"
- Manuel Calderon – mixing, engineering
- Heba Kadry – mastering

Artwork

- Victoria Legrand – photography, lettering
- Alexandra B. McLean – cover photo
- Post Typography – design

== Charts ==
Chart performance for Thank Your Lucky Stars
Chart (2015)	Peak position
Belgian Albums (Ultratop Flanders)	43
Belgian Albums (Ultratop Wallonia)	108
French Albums (SNEP)	108
Portuguese Albums (AFP)	29
Spanish Albums (Promusicae)	89
UK Albums (OCC)	145
UK Independent Albums (Official Charts)	28
US Billboard 200	39
US Independent Albums (Billboard)	6
US Top Alternative Albums (Billboard)	4
US Top Rock Albums (Billboard)	4

== Release history ==
Country	Date	Label
United States	October 15, 2015	Sub Pop
United Kingdom	October 15, 2015	Bella Union
Australia	October 15, 2015	Mistletone
