= Space Song =

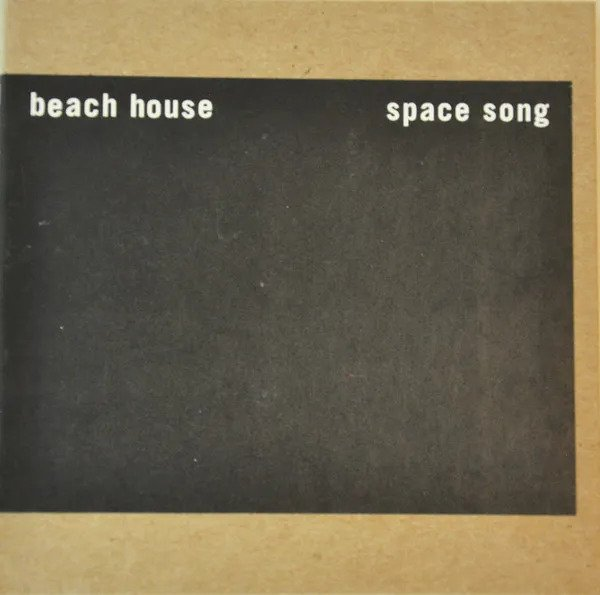

Promotional single by Beach House

from the album Depression Cherry
- Released: August 28, 2015
- Studio: Studio in the Country (Bogalusa, Louisiana)
- Genre: Dream pop
- Length: 5:20
- Label: Sub Pop
- Songwriters: Victoria Legrand; Alex Scally

Lyric video
- "Space Song" on YouTube

"Space Song" is a song by American dream pop duo Beach House from their fifth studio album, Depression Cherry (2015). It was released as the album's sole promotional single on August 28, 2015.

On April 12, 2023, the song was certified double-platinum by the RIAA, for sales of 2,000,000 certified units in the United States. In 2024, the song was certified platinum in the UK by the British Phonographic Industry (BPI).

== Release ==
"Space Song" was released as the third track on Beach House's fifth studio album, Depression Cherry, on August 28, 2015, through Sub Pop. It also served as the album's sole promotional single, which released the same day.

== Critical reception ==
"Space Song" received generally positive reviews from music critics. For Pitchfork, Jayson Greene labeled the song a "sweeping mid-album highlight", writing that "it registers as exactly the sort of high-flown Romantic soliloquy [Legrand's] always preferred." Heather Phares of AllMusic described it as a moment where Beach House "conjures a feeling of intimacy surrounded by vastness", with "arpeggiated keyboards suggesting stars shooting through an endless sky". In a more mixed review, NME's John Calvert disregarded the song as "essentially the same old Beach House aesthetic disguised as a retro-futurist ballad (think OutKast’s 'Prototype' with less Prince and more Neutral Milk Hotel)."

In a track review for The Atlantic, Lenika Cruz praised "Space Song" as "a gorgeous example of Beach House's knack for reimagining familiar elements into something fresh", as she noted that the song's snare is reused from their 2010 album Teen Dream. She concluded that while it "doesn't have the dirtier, shoegaze bent of Depression Cherry's standout track 'Sparks' [...] it, along with the rest of the album, makes for a terrific late-summer listen."

== In popular culture ==
"Space Song" became a sleeper hit after going viral on TikTok in early 2021. According to Spotify for Artists, it is used "as a way to show dramatic irony – emphasis on the dramatic."

In early 2021, the song began to be paired with an internet meme of Pedro Pascal laughing then crying. As of September 2022, the song has been used in over 200,000 videos on the platform. In an interview with Pitchfork, Beach House member Victoria Legrand said of the success of "Space Song" on TikTok:

I don't need to analyze it because I'm grateful for it. I don’t think it's just that song, but if that is the gateway, then I'm happy about it. We both feel lucky that younger people keep discovering us and we're able to keep making records.

In December 2022, the song saw a 41% increase in streams after being featured in the third episode of the Netflix original series Wednesday. The song is featured in the movie Nadia, Butterfly as part of its soundtrack.

== Charts ==
Chart performance for "Space Song"
Chart (2022–2023)	Peak position
Canada Hot 100 (Billboard)	81
Global 200 (Billboard)	184
Lithuania (AGATA)	72
UK Indie (OCC)	32
US Hot Rock & Alternative Songs (Billboard)	13

== Certifications ==
Certifications for "Space Song"
Region	Certification	Certified units/sales
Denmark (IFPI Danmark)	Gold	45,000^{‡}
Italy (FIMI)	Gold	50,000^{‡}
New Zealand (RMNZ)	2× Platinum	60,000^{‡}
Spain (Promusicae)	Gold	30,000^{‡}
United Kingdom (BPI)	Platinum	600,000^{‡}
United States (RIAA)	6× Platinum	6,000,000^{‡}
^{‡} Sales+streaming figures based on certification alone.
