= Master of None (song) =

2007 promotional single by Beach House

Promotional single by Beach House

from the album Beach House
- Released: September 17, 2007
- Genre: Dream pop
- Length: 3:19
- Label: Carpark; Bella Union
- Songwriter: Victoria Legrand

Music video
- "Master of None" on YouTube

"Master of None" is a song by American dream pop duo Beach House from their debut studio album, Beach House (2006), which was released through Carpark Records. It was released as a promotional single on September 17, 2007, through Bella Union. Written by lead vocalist and keyboardist Victoria Legrand, the song is arranged in a funk-leaning rhythm with supporting instruments including a synthesizer and a guitar.

To promote "Master of None" and its accompanying album, Beach House released two music videos for the song in January and July 2007. The song has been received well by critics, who complimented its sound atmosphere and considered it a highlight from Beach House. Since its release, the song was sampled by Canadian singer The Weeknd and has also been featured on media such as The Future (2011) and the Netflix-original series of the same name (2015). It has later received certifications in New Zealand and in the United Kingdom.

== Background and composition ==
In 2004, lead vocalist Victoria Legrand moved from her birthplace of Paris to Baltimore after being dissatisfied with theater school, and she later met guitarist Alex Scally in the city, and both would also be in a band at the time: Daggerhearts, which would later disband in 2005 due to "dysfunctionality". In spite of this, both members still decided to create music together, and Scally often invited Legrand to his house to hang out or to write music.

They began recording their self-titled debut album over a two-day period in 2005 in Scally's basement, which reportedly cost about $1,000. They wrote several songs beforehand during the summer of that year, with the high temperatures at the time making this process "go slower". In August 2006, their song "Apple Orchard" was featured as the 34th entry on Pitchfork's Infinite Mixtape series, which would help them earn international recognition. "Master of None", the fourth track from the band's debut album, has a "slightly funkier rhythm" supported by "radiant" synthesizers and "dreamy" guitars. Legrand's "most soulful" voice in the song "temporarily breaks the album's strangely ritualistic spell", with the overall track relying on reverb.

== Promotion and release ==
Beach House's self-titled debut studio album was released on October 3, 2006, with "Master of None" appearing as its fourth track. Three days later, on October 6, Beach House announced on their website that a music video for "Master of None" was being filmed, stating that it would feature people from their hometown, Baltimore. In January 2007, the band released said music video for "Master of None", which was directed by Justin Durel. They released another video for the track in July 2007, which was directed by Dan Sully and coincided with the official release of their self-titled album in the United Kingdom. The song was later released as a promotional single on September 17, 2007, by Bella Union.

== Reception and legacy ==
Vicky Eacott from Gigwise named "Master of None" as a highlight track from Beach House's self-titled album, additionally calling it "similarly beautiful and atmospheric" as its preceding track "Apple Orchard". In 2013, John Everhart of Stereogum named "Master of None" as the second best Beach House song, stating that "[Victoria's] magnificent lyrics often get lost in the rather beguiling amalgamation of slide guitars and vintage synthesizers, but dig deeper and they're enigmatic yet engaging". Max Savage Levenson from Paste named it the third best Beach House song in 2015, complimenting "its insanely catchy melody".

"Master of None" was covered by American singer Toro y Moi in 2009. It was also sampled on Canadian singer The Weeknd's song "The Party & The After Party", which is from his debut mixtape House of Balloons (2011). It was also featured on Miranda July's 2011 drama film The Future. The song was later used in the Netflix show of the same name. On July 24, 2025, "Master of None" received a gold certification in New Zealand. On April 3, 2026, the song received a silver certification by the British Phonographic Industry (BPI), denoting a total of 200,000 units sold in the United Kingdom based on sales and streaming figures.

== Personnel ==
Credits adapted from the liner notes of Beach House.

Beach House

- Victoria Legrand – vocals, various instruments
- Alex Scally – various instruments

Production

- Rob Girardi – recording, mixing
- Adam Cooke – recording
- Rusty Santos – mastering

== Certifications ==
Certifications for "Master of None"
Region	Certification	Certified units/sales
New Zealand (RMNZ)	Gold	15,000^{‡}
United Kingdom (BPI)	Silver	200,000^{‡}
^{‡} Sales+streaming figures based on certification alone.
