= Depression Cherry =

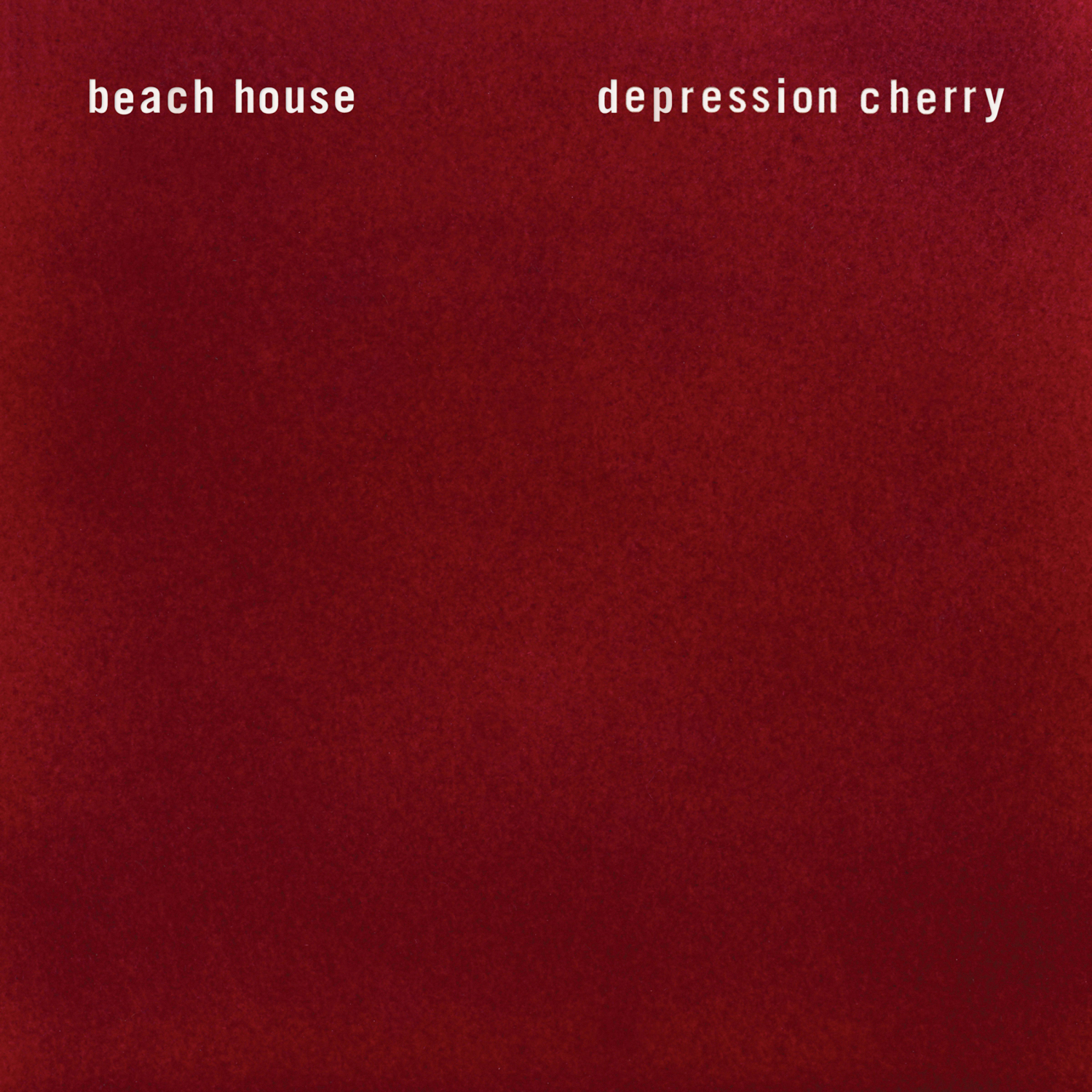

Studio album by Beach House
- Released: August 28, 2015
- Recorded: November 2014 – January 2015
- Studios: Studio in the Country (Bogalusa, Louisiana)
- Genre: Dream pop
- Length: 44:45
- Label: Sub Pop
- Producers: Beach House; Chris Coady

Beach House chronology
Bloom (2012)	Depression Cherry (2015)	Thank Your Lucky Stars (2015)

Singles from Depression Cherry
- 1. "Sparks" Released: July 1, 2015

Depression Cherry is the fifth studio album by the American dream pop duo Beach House. It was released on August 28, 2015, through Sub Pop in the United States, Bella Union in Europe, Mistletone Records in Australia, Hostess Entertainment in Japan and Arts & Crafts in Mexico. Serving as a follow-up to their previous album Bloom (2012), the album was arranged and performed entirely by the duo, while the songs were written by lead vocalist Victoria Legrand. The duo additionally produced it alongside Chris Coady, being his third time working with the group.

After touring in support of their previous album Bloom, Beach House took a six-month break. During this break, they insisted on not thinking about developing an album, additionally reacting to their dissatisfaction with incorporating live drums on tour. They would return to a simpler style of dream pop arrangements for Depression Cherry, relying on less usage of live drums and instead constructing around drum machine rhythms, similar to the musical styles of their first two studio albums. The duo began looking for musical inspiration and began writing songs for the album between 2012 and 2014. They later began recording the entire album at Studio in the Country in Bogalusa, Louisiana, from November 2014 to January 2015. Before joining each other in the studio, the duo sent Coady several demo recordings.

To promote Depression Cherry, the duo released its lead single, "Sparks", on July 1, 2015, and previewed album tracks "PPP" and "Beyond Love" during an interview on August 6, 2015. Despite the album being leaked on the Internet during the same month, it was released to mostly positive reviews from critics, with some likening its musical approach to the band's first two studio albums, while some criticized its repetitiveness. It debuted at number eight on the Billboard 200, with 27,000 copies sold. They further supported the album by going on a concert tour from August to December 2017. Less than two months after releasing Depression Cherry, Beach House followed it up with their sixth studio album, Thank Your Lucky Stars, which they described as not a companion.

Years after its release, the album earned an increased commercial reception after its promotional single, "Space Song", went viral on social media platforms, primarily TikTok. A sleeper hit, the song had an increase of streams through this virality and its usage in the 2022 Netflix series Wednesday. In 2025, the song was certified quadruple-platinum by the Recording Industry Association of America (RIAA), while the album was certified platinum in 2026, being their first album to earn such designation. It also received a gold certification in New Zealand.

== Background ==
On May 15, 2012, Beach House released their fourth studio album Bloom, which was supported by the singles "Myth" and "Lazuli". Recorded at Sonic Ranch in Tornillo, Texas, the album was met with critical acclaim from several music critics. It was also a commercial success, being their best-selling album on the US Billboard 200, debuting at number seven with 41,000 copies sold within its first week. In an August 2012 interview with Rolling Stone, when asked if the band were recording any new material, lead vocalist Victoria Legrand revealed that she instead thought about what she wanted to make within the next album. They further supported the album's success by releasing an accompanying short film consisting of live performances of songs from the album, Forever Still, and toured worldwide extensively throughout that year and 2013.

After finishing the supporting concert tours for Bloom, the group took a six-month break. Legrand added, "I just personally felt I needed a couple of months of just not doing anything, I didn't have thoughts." Uncertain about their future, singer/keyboardist Victoria Legrand said, "I didn't feel creative at all... I just thought well, maybe I'll never have another musical idea." Legrand reflected on the "aggravated" usage of live drums during their song performances on the Bloom tours because of "the noise it creates and how much space it fills". Guitarist Alex Scally concurred, saying, "There was a transparent feeling, [the songs] didn't feel as nuanced." On May 26, 2015, the band announced their fifth studio album, Depression Cherry, additionally revealing its tracklist and album artwork.

== Recording and production ==
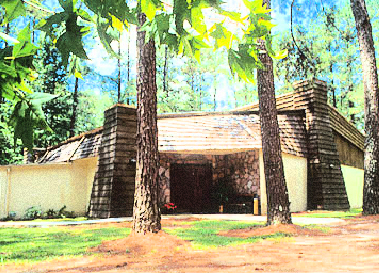
Recording sessions for Depression Cherry took place from November 2014 to January 2015 at Studio in the Country. (pictured)

Beach House came up with a portion of musical ideas for Depression Cherry in 2011, subsequently writing songs for the album in Baltimore, their hometown, between 2012 and 2014; "10:37" was one of the first songs to be written during this period. The album was recorded at Studio in the Country in Bogalusa, Louisiana over two months, from November 2014 to January 2015. It was co-produced by Chris Coady, who worked on the band's previous two records, Teen Dream (2010) and Bloom. Prior to joining the band in the studio, they sent him phone recordings of some of their in-progress songs.

The band has also stated that they've incorporated live drums on their previous records, but then "[they] got tired of them" and had written the album without using them, as a way of "going back to [their] roots a little". For the recording of "Sparks", the band used a keyboard that they bought in Texas during the recording sessions for Bloom. Additionally, the song contains a running vocal loop that was "accidentally" captured at a soundcheck in Bristol, England. For the song "Days of Candy", they hired eight singers from Pearl River Community College to create a 24-part choir. After completing that song and "Levitation", the band knew they had the album's closing and opening tracks, respectively, and considered the record completed. The album was mixed at Sunset Sound in Hollywood, California, except "Beyond Love", which was mixed at Sonic Ranch in Tornillo, Texas.

== Musical style ==
According to the band, Depression Cherry is a return to the simpler style of dream pop from their first two albums, stating in a press release on the Sub Pop website, that "live drums play [...] a far lesser role" and that within the album, they "continue to let ourselves evolve while fully ignoring the commercial context in which we exist". Kevin Warwick of The A.V. Club commented that several tracks from the album are "constructed on rudimentary programmed rhythms as opposed to live studio drumming". Tim Jonze of The Guardian also stated that the album "lacks the bigger pop moments of their last two albums, Bloom and Teen Dream", due to a lack of live drums, though he considered that the band "increase their impressive ability" with this musical approach. The album also relies on organ chords and slide guitar licks.

The album's opener, "Levitation", begins with a "high-F♯ drone" which crossfades into a "lovely saturated D chord", as well as a "tap-tapping electronic rhythm", with the song itself being said to succeed the 2012 track "Irene", featured on the band's previous album Bloom. It then progresses onto the following track, "Sparks", which begins with a vocal loop played at the start. The loop is then interrupted by a distorted guitar, thus being described as a shoegaze track. Throughout the entire song, a distorted organ and percussion are also used. Transitioning onto the third track, "Space Song", it opens with an organ sound and leaps into a sliding guitar and an "8-bit keyboard" arpeggio which run throughout the entire track. "Beyond Love", its fourth track, features a slide guitar and accompanying drum machine rhythms.

== Promotion and release ==
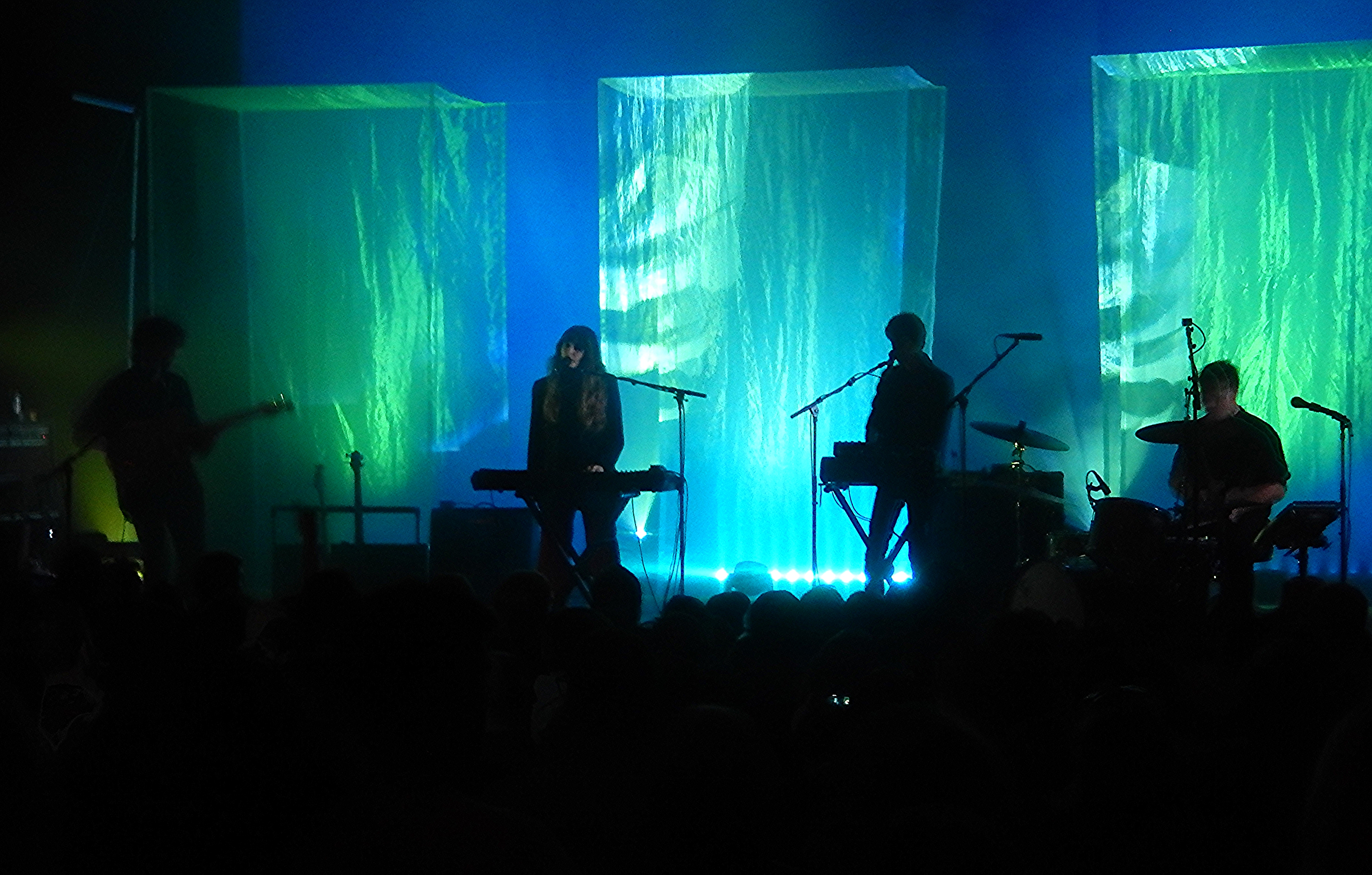
Beach House performing at the Depression Cherry tour in Milwaukee in September 2015.

On May 26, 2015, Beach House announced Depression Cherry along with tour dates supporting the album. Vinyl and compact disc copies of the album feature a cover lined with red velvet, while a limited edition "Loser Edition" of the album was released on clear vinyl record. On June 26, Beach House announced on Twitter that they would perform "Sparks" on SiriusXMU on July 1, adding that it would be the lead single from Depression Cherry. The single was subsequently released and performed on SiriusXMU on the confirmed date, alongside the release of the song's accompanying visualizer, which was released on YouTube. On July 9, Depression Cherry was leaked on the internet through a data breach on music site Spin. On August 6, "PPP" and "Beyond Love" were previewed during an interview with WBUR-FM's Here and Now.

These two tracks, along with "Sparks", were later published through the band's website and could be accessed through the "Single Finder" feature, which allows a user to choose three songs, particularly their favorite ones, from the band's past catalog and depending on their choices, it determines which single would likely be their favorite. On August 19, nine days before the album's release, NPR Music made a stream of the album available online. The album was released on August 28, 2015, for digital download, CD, LP and cassette formats, though Sub Pop in North America and Bella Union in Europe. The album debuted at number eight on the Billboard 200, with 27,000 copies sold in its first week. It also debuted within the top 20 in eight other countries, which are Belgium's Flanders region (13), Canada (16), Denmark (20), Netherlands (16), Portugal (12), Scotland (18), and the United Kingdom (17). About two months later, on October 7 of the same year, Beach House announced their sixth studio album Thank Your Lucky Stars, which was stated to be a follow-up, but not a companion, to Depression Cherry or a "surprise or B-sides". The follow-up album was additionally written from July to November 2014 and recorded at the same time as Depression Cherry.

"Space Song", the album's third track, was initially released as a promotional single in 2015. The song became a sleeper hit, when about six years later, in 2021, the song attained virality on TikTok and later received a platinum certification by the Recording Industry Association of America (RIAA) in January 2022. The song was later featured in the Netflix-original television series Wednesday (2022), appearing in its third episode. After its appearance on the series, the song earned over four million streams in the United States, within the November 25–December 1, 2022, tracking week. Following the tracking week, it debuted at number 20 on the US Hot Rock & Alternative Songs chart, later peaking at nunber 13 on the chart the following week. On April 12, 2023, the song was certified double-platinum by the RIAA, for sales of 2,000,000 certified units in the United States. On March 6, 2026, Depression Cherry received a platinum certification by the Recording Industry Association of America (RIAA), for sales of 1,000,000 certified units in the United States.

== Critical reception ==
Professional ratings
Aggregate scores
Source	Rating
AnyDecentMusic?	7.5/10
Metacritic	76/100
Review scores
Source	Rating
AllMusic	4/5 stars
The A.V. Club	A−
Entertainment Weekly	A−
The Guardian	4/5 stars
The Irish Times	4/5 stars
NME	5/10
Pitchfork	8.4/10
Q	3/5 stars
Rolling Stone	3.5/5 stars
Spin	8/10

Depression Cherry received mostly positive reviews from contemporary music critics, with a majority complimenting its musical arrangements and direction, while some criticism drew towards its repetitive structures. At Metacritic, which assigns a weighted mean rating out of 100 to reviews from mainstream critics, the album received an average score of 76, based on 34 reviews, which indicates "generally favorable reviews". Aggregator AnyDecentMusic? gave it 7.5 out of 10, based on their assessment of the critical consensus.

Eric Renner Brown of Entertainment Weekly complimented Legrand's vocal structures and the instrumentals within the album, calling them "exquisite". Awarding the album with the "Best New Music" accolade, Jayson Greene of Pitchfork praised the album's instrumentals, classifying them as "ethereal", and concluded that the band had "never sounded exactly this full and soaring before". Tim Jonze of The Guardian stated that the album "lacks the bigger pop moments of their last two albums, Bloom and Teen Dream", although he approves the band's musical approach and stated that the band "increase their impressive ability to sound like they’re whispering each song".

AllMusic's Heather Phares likened the album's musical approach to the band's earlier studio albums and said that it's "a grower that demands and rewards close listening -- especially under headphones". Will Hermes of Rolling Stone called it "A formula that might seem limiting feels instead like it can contain entire worlds". In a mixed review, John Calvert of NME claimed that the album can "becoming increasingly uninteresting", though he further stated that "the duo stick closely to their signature steady pacing and two-piece dynamic, with diminishing returns".

=== Accolades ===
Depression Cherry was named as one of the best albums of 2015 by several music publications, including Blare Magazine, Diffuser.fm, and Under the Radar, who placed it in their top 10, while other publications such as No Ripcord, Paste, Pretty Much Amazing, and Sputnikmusic have placed it in their top 20.

Publication	Accolade	Rank	Ref.
Blare Magazine	Top 50 Albums of 2015	9	
Complex	50 Best Albums of 2015	42	
Crack	Best Albums of 2015	31	
Diffuser.fm	The 50 Best Albums of 2015	9	
Drowned in Sound	Favorite Albums of the Year 2015	70	
Gigwise	Albums of the Year 2015	28	
Gorilla vs. Bear	Albums of 2015	38	
musicOMH	Top 50 Albums Of 2015	41	
No Ripcord	Top 50 Albums of 2015	19	
Paste	50 Best Albums of 2015	19	
Pitchfork	The 50 Best Albums of 2015	28	
PopMatters	80 Best Albums of 2015	40	
Pretty Much Amazing	The 50 Best Albums of 2015	22	
Rolling Stone	50 Best Albums of 2015	33	
Rough Trade	Albums of the Year 2015	28	
Spin	The 50 Best Albums of 2015	16	
Sputnikmusic	Top 50 Albums of 2015	19	
Stereogum	The 50 Best Albums of 2015	47	
The Skinny	Top 50 Best Albums of 2015	31	
The Daily Telegraph	The Best Albums of 2015	—	
The Vinyl Factory	The 50 Best LPs of 2015	46	
Under the Radar	Top 100 Albums of 2015	8	

== Track listing ==
All lyrics written by Victoria Legrand; all music composed and arranged by Beach House.

No.	Title	Length
1.	"Levitation"	5:54
2.	"Sparks"	5:20
3.	"Space Song"	5:20
4.	"Beyond Love"	4:24
5.	"10:37"	3:48
6.	"PPP"	6:08
7.	"Wildflower"	3:38
8.	"Bluebird"	3:56
9.	"Days of Candy"	6:16
Total length:		44:44

== Personnel ==
Credits adapted from the liner notes of Depression Cherry.

Beach House

- Alex Scally
- Victoria Legrand

Additional musicians

- Graham Hill – live drums and percussion on all tracks except "Sparks" and "PPP"
- Chris Bear – live drums on "Sparks" and "PPP"
- Voice/choir majors at Pearl River Community College – vocal chorus on "Days of Candy"
  - Lane Stewart
  - Lydia Howard
  - Lindsey Strahan
  - Mallory Cumberland
  - Ethan Martin
  - Jacob Cochran
  - LaDona Tyson – organization
  - Archie Rawls – organization

Production

- Beach House – production, mixing
- Chris Coady – production, mixing on all tracks except "Beyond Love"
- David Tolomei – engineering
- Jay Wesley – assistant engineering
- Shane Wesley – "all around dude"
- Morgan Stratton – assistant engineering
- Manuel Calderon – mixing on "Beyond Love"
- Greg Calbi – mastering

Artwork

- Brian Roettinger – design
- Beach House – photography

== Charts ==
=== Weekly charts ===
Chart (2015)	Peak position
Australian Albums (ARIA)	34
Belgian Albums (Ultratop Flanders)	13
Belgian Albums (Ultratop Wallonia)	35
Canadian Albums (Billboard)	16
Danish Albums (Hitlisten)	20
Dutch Albums (Album Top 100)	16
French Albums (SNEP)	30
German Albums (Offizielle Top 100)	81
Irish Albums (IRMA)	27
Irish Independent Albums (IRMA)	3
Portuguese Albums (AFP)	12
Scottish Albums (Official Charts)	18
Spanish Albums (Promusicae)	37
Swedish Albums (Sverigetopplistan)	24
Swiss Albums (Schweizer Hitparade)	58
UK Albums (Official Charts)	17
UK Independent Albums (Official Charts)	2
US Billboard 200	8
US Independent Albums (Billboard)	1
US Top Alternative Albums (Billboard)	2
US Top Rock Albums (Billboard)	1

=== Year-end charts ===
Chart (2015)	Position
US Independent Albums (Billboard)	38

== Certifications ==
Region	Certification	Certified units/sales
New Zealand (RMNZ)	Gold	7,500^{‡}
United States (RIAA)	Platinum	1,000,000^{‡}
^{‡} Sales+streaming figures based on certification alone.
