= Sparks (Beach House song) =

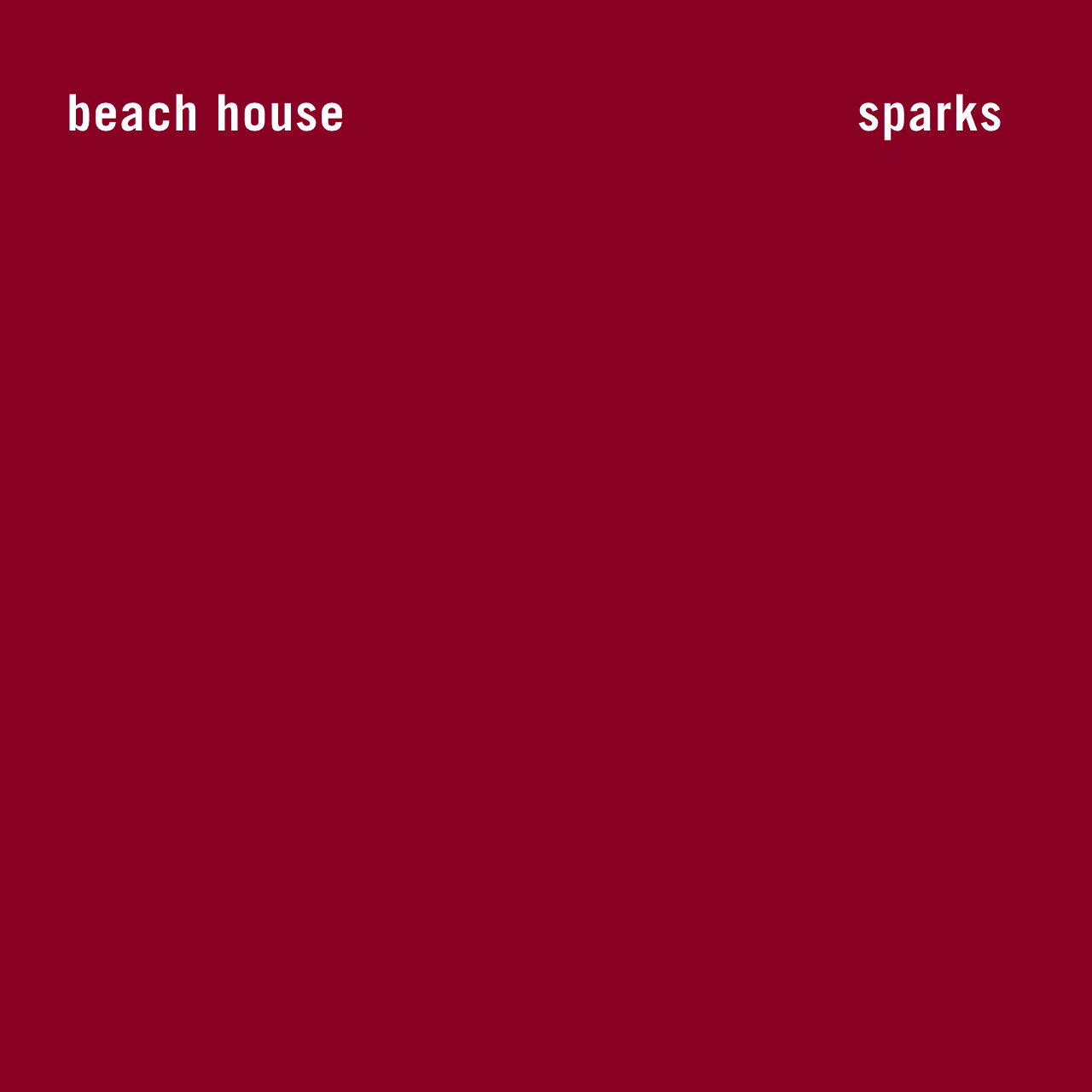

Single by Beach House

from the album Depression Cherry
- Released: July 1, 2015
- Recorded: November 2014 – January 2015
- Studio: Studio in the Country (Bogalusa, Louisiana)
- Genre: Dream pop; shoegaze
- Length: 5:21 (album version); 4:10 (radio edit)
- Label: Sub Pop; Bella Union
- Songwriters: Victoria Legrand; Alex Scally
- Producers: Beach House; Chris Coady

Beach House singles chronology
"Lazuli" (2012)	"Sparks" (2015)	"Chariot" (2017)

Visualizer
- "Sparks" on YouTube

"Sparks" is a song by American dream pop band Beach House. It was released on July 1, 2015, through Sub Pop, as the lead single from their fifth studio album Depression Cherry (2015). A visualizer for the song was uploaded on the band's YouTube channel on the same day.

== Background ==
In May 2015, Beach House announced their fifth studio album Depression Cherry (2015), along with its accompanying tour dates; "Sparks" appeared as the second track. On June 26, 2015, Beach House announced on Twitter that they would play "Sparks" on SiriusXMU on July 1, adding that it would be the lead single from the album. It was chosen as a single by the duo not because they thought that it would be a hit, but because of "the ability for the song to connect between their previous songs and Depression Cherry."

== Recording and composition ==
"Sparks" was recorded at Studio in the Country in Bogalusa, Louisiana, along with the rest of Depression Cherry. Lead vocalist Victoria Legrand, in an interview with Entertainment Weekly, said that the song "happened" because of a "wild" sound from a keyboard the duo bought in Texas in between recording sessions of their fourth studio album Bloom (2012). She also stated that the song is a "nice beginning of another place that still has some of the past in it."

The song begins with a vocal loop of Legrand's voice that was "accidentally" captured at the duo's soundcheck in Bristol, England, in which her and guitarist Alex Scally were fascinated by the sound of it, holding up their phones and recording the loop. It has also been described as a shoegaze track, featuring a distorted guitar which interrupts the vocal loop. Throughout the entire song, an organ and percussion are also used.

== Release and reception ==
"Sparks" was released on July 1, 2015. On August 10, 2015, the song would also be released on the band's website, along with two other songs from the album, "PPP" and "Beyond Love". Either one of the songs could be accessed by using the temporary "Single Finder" feature on the band's website.

Chosen as "Best New Track", Eric Torres of Pitchfork described the song as "a distilled version of the devotionals with which Beach House first found their footing, pulling from the past while looking resolutely into the future." Additionally, it appeared on the website's list of the best songs of 2015, placed at number 49.

== Track listing ==
- US CD single
1. "Sparks" (radio edit) – 4:10
2. "Sparks" (album version) – 5:21

== Personnel ==
Beach House

- Alex Scally
- Victoria Legrand

Additional

- Chris Coady – production
- Chris Bear – drums
- Jay Wesley – assistant engineering
- Morgan Stratton – assistant engineering
