= Beyond Love =

Beyond Love may refer to:

- Beyond Love (film), 1940 Italian film
- "Beyond Love", song by Beach House from Depression Cherry
