= Beach House (album) =

2006 studio album by Beach House

Studio album by Beach House
- Released: October 3, 2006
- Recorded: 2005
- Genres: Dream pop; indie pop
- Length: 36:38
- Labels: Carpark; Bella Union

Beach House chronology
| Beach House (2006) | Devotion (2008) |

Beach House is the debut studio album by American dream pop duo Beach House. It was released on October 3, 2006, by Carpark Records in North America, Bella Union in Europe, and Mistletone Records in Australia. After meeting each other in 2004 and later splitting from another band the following year, Daggerhearts, members Victoria Legrand and Alex Scally decided to write a set of songs together, as they wanted to form a band. They would record their debut album on a 4-track recording tape in 2005 over a two-day period in Scally's basement.

Beach House contains nine tracks, featuring a dream pop and indie pop sound, with influences of lo-fi and shoegaze. The instrumentation throughout consists of slide guitars, organs, tambourines and keyboards, which are performed alongside programmed drum rhythms. "Apple Orchard", the album's third track, was featured on music publication Pitchfork's Infinite Mixtape series in August 2006, which helped Beach House and their album gain attention and discussion through music blogs. To further promote the album, the duo released two videos for promotional single "Master of None", with the second video accompanying the album's official release in the United Kingdom.

Beach House received positive reviews from contemporary music critics upon release. Since its release, the album has received reissues on vinyl starting in 2007. They later released their second studio album Devotion in February 2008, which would be their final album with Carpark. In 2010, the band were involved in a copyright dispute with British folk trio Tony, Caro and John, over missing attribution for "Lovelier Girl"; this was later resolved after discussions. By April 2012, Beach House had sold a total of 24,000 copies in the United States, according to Nielsen Soundscan.

== Background and recording ==
In 2004, Victoria Legrand relocated from Paris to Baltimore after being dissatisfied with theater school. She also moved there because a fellow colleague from Vassar College was also living there. That same year, she met Alex Scally through a mutual friend they refer to as Dirk. They first met at the porch of Scally's family home and Legrand handed him a music CD, and by their second meeting they already began recording in Legrand's basement. They often hung out or recorded music at each other's homes, living about 400 feet away from each other. Aside from bonding over music, both of them also maintained day jobs; Scally worked with his father as a carpenter, while Legrand worked as a waitress at a Mexican restaurant. They were also members of another band at the time, Daggerhearts, which would later disband in 2005 due to "dysfunctionality".

After Daggerhearts disbanded, Legrand and Scally both decided to continue writing music together, as they wanted to form a band. Scally regularly invited Legrand to his house to try a variety of organs he had used on 4-track recordings, which were kept in storage. They eventually began recording their first album over a two-day period in 2005 in Scally's basement, relying on a 4-track recording tape. During this time, they had used several organs and a guitar to develop their sound. The budget for the recording process was reportedly about $1,000. The duo wrote their first song, "Saltwater," during a hangout at Scally's house, where he played random chords. He described it as an "insanely natural thing." Inspiration for their band name came from "House on the Hill," one of the songs recorded for the album. Several songs were written during the summer of that year, with the high temperatures at the time making the process "go slower".

== Music and lyrics ==
"Master of None"
"Master of None", the album's only promotional single, features atmospheric synthesizers and guitars, reverb utilization, and Legrand's "soulful" voice.

Beach House has been described as a dream pop and indie pop record, with influences from lo-fi music, shoegaze and drone-pop. Throughout the entire album, elements of slide guitars and organs are frequently used, adding to these elements with Casiotone keyboards, simple programmed drum beats, and bossa nova-like rhythms, drawing comparisons to the musical style of other bands such as Mazzy Star, Galaxie 500, Spiritualized and Slowdive. Legrand's vocals throughout the album were also likened to Nico and Hope Sandoval. The tempos found in the album's tracks range from mid-tempo to downtempo.

The instrumentation of the album's "lazy, drifting" opening track, "Saltwater", consists of a "sputtering", synthetic drum machine, distorted guitars and "incandescent", decayed organs. Supported by reverb, Legrand begins singing sentimentally, "Love you all the time / even though you're not mine" in the song's chorus. The song abruptly ends as Legrand concludes the song with "You couldn't lose me if you tried", before transitioning into the next track, "Tokyo Witch", which is supported by a "silvery" slide guitar and a tambourine-relying beat, along with Legrand's "wistful sighing". "Apple Orchard" is a psychedelic track that features Legrand's sweeping, ethereal vocals, with its spacious instrumentation relying on slide guitar elements. The lyrics revolve around the alleviation of an "exhausted, heartbroken sob", who is conceded in the arms of an old partner, specifically during the song's final lyrics in which Legrand sings, "Take your time / you can settle down". "Master of None" has a "slightly funkier rhythm" which is supported by "radiant" synthesizers and "dreamy" guitars, additionally relying on reverb, while Legrand's "soulful" voice on the track "temporarily breaks the album's strangely ritualistic spell". "Auburn and Ivory" is an "aloof" track with a waltz rhythm that draws from 1960s psychedelic and classical music influences. It is a "haunting" track that heavily relies on harpsichord throughout.

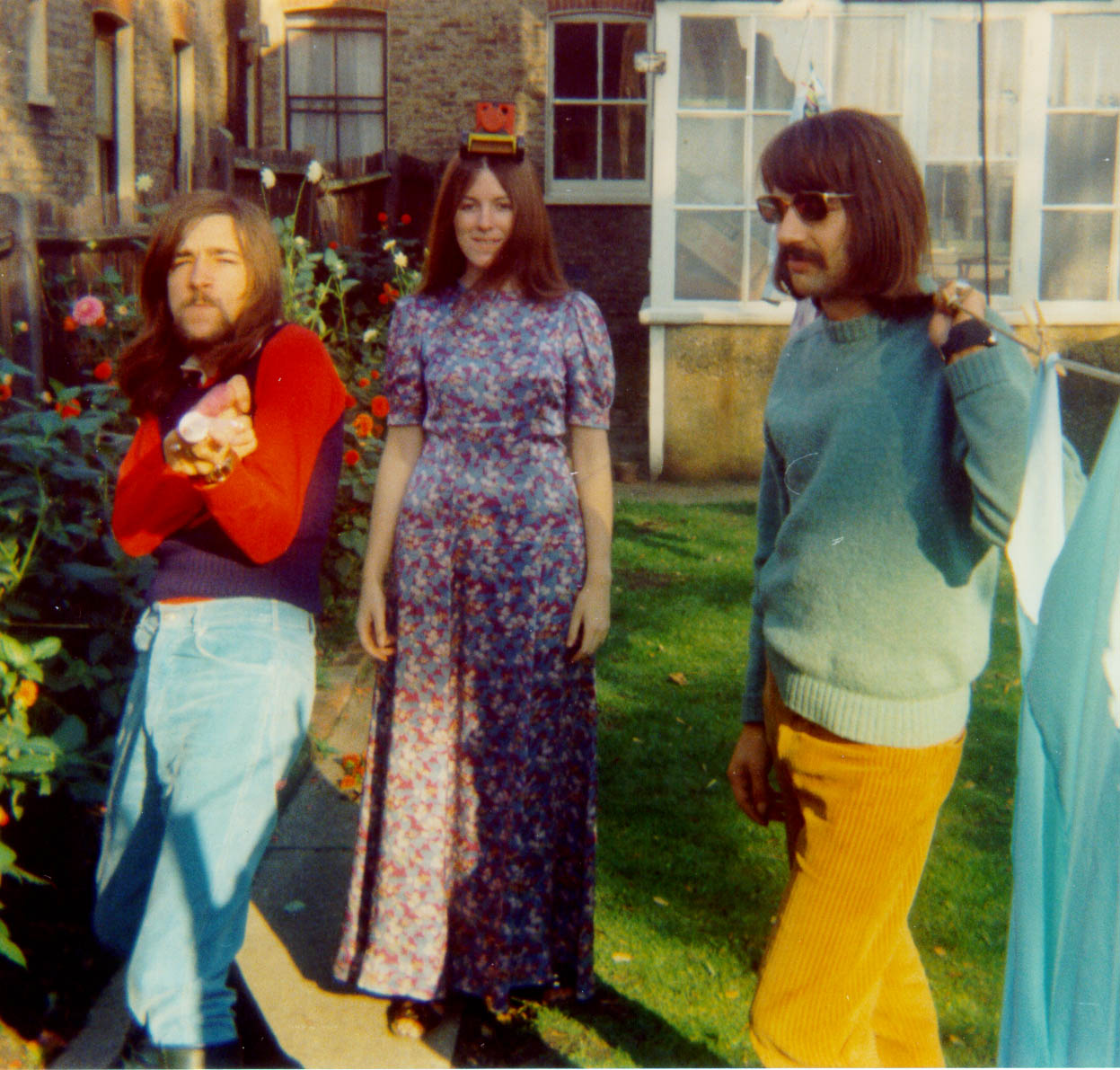
"Lovelier Girl" is a modified-cover of Tony, Caro and John's (pictured) song "The Snowdon Song".

"Childhood" is the album's most upbeat track, featuring slight incorporations of country music and percussion elements, including a tambourine. The lullaby-like track relies on a simple drum beat and a "music hall piano part" in the middle of the song, with its overall lyrics surrounding one being unrequited in love. The slide guitar on the track resembles the soundtrack for the 2002 video game Super Mario Sunshine, according to Aaron Paskon of Spectrum Culture. "Lovelier Girl" is a "swirling, shimmering" pop track that further demonstrates the album's psychedelic music influences. It is a cover of British psychedelic folk group Tony, Caro and John's 1972 composition "The Snowdon Song", which was instead altered by changing its original key, time signature and lyrics. "House on the Hill" has a different programmed percussion sound than the rest of the songs on the album, switching simple beats for "faint" metallic clangs. It contains an acoustic guitar and an immense organ. The album's closing track, "Heart and Lungs", is a "hazy" composition of brighter key notes, ending with extended "gorgeous" harmonies that fade out. A "muffled" piano-relying hidden track plays after a rough minute of silence following "Heart and Lungs". This hidden track was later known as "Rain in Numbers", and was featured on the duo's compilation album B-Sides and Rarities (2017).

== Promotion and release ==
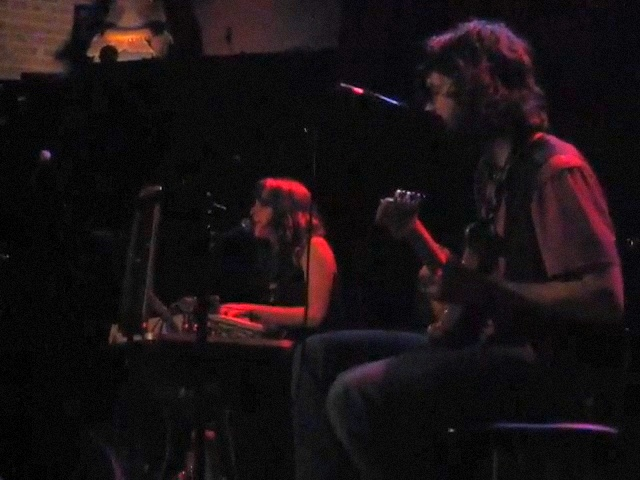
Beach House performing at the High Noon Saloon in June 2007.

Beach House, the duo's self-titled debut studio album, was released on October 3, 2006, through Carpark Records and Bella Union. In August 2006, before the album's official release, Beach House's song "Apple Orchard" was featured as the 34th entry on Pitchfork's Infinite Mixtape series. This would help the duo gain an adequate amount of recognition worldwide. It also lead to them being frequently discussed about on music blogs all over the Internet later that same year. Before releasing the album, Scally expected it to sell at least 500 copies. On October 6, the duo announced on their website that a music video for "Master of None" was being filmed, stating that it would also feature people from their hometown, Baltimore. In support of the album, they toured throughout November 2006, including a live performance at Cake Shop NYC on November 1 of that year, which was named as publication Stereogum's third favorite live performance of the year.

In January 2007, the band released the official music video for "Master of None". Directed by Justin Durel, the video is set at a party, filmed in Scally's basement. Around the same month, it was announced that the duo would be the opening act for band Grizzly Bear's show on March 6, 2007; they later added another opening show for the following day. In February 2007, they announced the album's official release through Mistletone Records in Australia, along with a confirmation that new songs were being written. They released another music video for "Master of None", which coincided with the official release of the album in the United Kingdom on July 7, 2007. Around the same month, the duo announced that they would be touring with indie pop band Papercuts on some dates. On July 14, the duo performed at the 2007 Pitchfork Music Festival. A year after the album's release, in October 2007, the album saw an availability on white vinyl by HeartBreakBeat Records. In 2010, the album had a remastered reissue by HeartBreakBeat with a run limited to 1,000 copies on black vinyl. In 2012, a pressing on special edition white vinyl was released through Bella Union. By April of that same year, Beach House had sold 24,000 copies in the United States, according to Nielsen Soundscan.

== Reception and legacy ==
Professional ratings
Aggregate scores
| Source | Rating |
|---|---|
| Metacritic | 73/100 |
Review scores
| Source | Rating |
| AllMusic | 3.5/5 stars |
| Drowned in Sound | 8/10 |
| Gigwise | 4/5 stars |
| The Guardian | 3/5 stars |
| The Line of Best Fit | 6.9/10 |
| Now | 3/5 Ns |
| Pitchfork | 8.1/10 |
| PopMatters | 8/10 |
| Rolling Stone | 2.5/5 stars |
| Stylus Magazine | B+ |

Upon release, Beach House was received well by contemporary music critics. At Metacritic, which assigns a normalized rating out of 100 to reviews from mainstream critics, the album received an average score of 73, based on 14 reviews, indicating "generally favorable reviews". Responding positively, Mark Pytlik of Pitchfork said that the album evoked a "recipe of fairground waltzes, ghosted lullabies, and woodland hymnals". The website also included the album at number sixteen on their list of the top 50 albums of 2006, additionally including "Apple Orchard" as the eighth best song of 2006. MacKenzie Wilson of AllMusic prompted that the album's "exquisiteness [...] should not go unnoticed", naming it as one of the "mystical" indie pop releases of 2006. Jordan Dowling of Drowned in Sound stated that Beach House "yearns for a simpler life", guaranteeing that "it seems within reach". Peter Lindblad of Lost at Sea called the album a "beguiling" project that "sounds both summery and autumnal", further comparing it to the musical style of Yo La Tengo.

A writer from Almost Cool said "it sounds like a late summer album," and acknowledged its listenability during the winter season, stating that it sound "dark enough that [...] it will sound nice looking out the window to a dusting of snow". Bernardo Rondeau of Dusted Magazine said it is "a dream of an album." Jennifer Kelly of PopMatters said that these tracks "emerge from a dense, nebulous drift of reverbed sound" and complimented that it is "so exceptionally well-shaped and unitary". Sarah Liss of Now called it a "solid debut," while Caroline Sullivan of The Guardian called it "deeply atmospheric, and occassionally stirring," though stated that album highlight "Auburn and Ivory" demonstrates that its "atmosphere isn't enough to carry a whole album." Some critics also regarded the impossibility of finding song highlights within the album, including Rich Hughes of The Line of Best Fit, who explained that because of the album's short duration, "the few highlights that are here are worthy of [the listener's] attention," proposing that slight modifications to the overall tempos would have made the album more "memorable". In a mixed review, Christian Hoard of Rolling Stone claimed that attempting to find any great moments within the album "often feels like hard work."

In 2010, four years after the release of Beach House, specifically around the time during the release of the band's third studio album, Teen Dream (2010), British psychedelic folk trio Tony, Caro and John contacted Beach House over the adaptation of the former's track "The Snowdon Song" on the latter's album track "Lovelier Girl", where they changed the key and time signature, and altering the lyrics, with no attribution given to the former. After amicable discussions on copyright, the authorship of the "Lovelier Girl" version of the song was now jointly attributed to Beach House and Tony Doré of the trio. In 2011, the song "Master of None" was sampled by Canadian singer The Weeknd for his song "The Party & The After Party" off his 2011 debut mixtape House of Balloons. The song was also used in the Netflix show of the same name, as well as featuring in Miranda July's 2011 German-American drama film The Future. For the album's 20th anniversary, Aaron Paskon of Spectrum Culture contended that the album "was so successful" in demonstrating the style of the dream pop genre that "it changed the very nature of dream-pop itself."

== Track listing ==
All lyrics are written by Victoria Legrand; all music is composed by Beach House, except where noted.

| No. | Title | Length |
|---|---|---|
| 1. | "Saltwater" | 2:55 |
| 2. | "Tokyo Witch" | 3:42 |
| 3. | "Apple Orchard" | 4:31 |
| 4. | "Master of None" | 3:19 |
| 5. | "Auburn and Ivory" | 4:30 |
| 6. | "Childhood" | 3:35 |
| 7. | "Lovelier Girl" (Beach House, Tony Doré) | 3:02 |
| 8. | "House on the Hill" | 3:14 |
| 9. | "Heart and Lungs" (hidden track "Rain in Numbers" starts at 5:25) | 7:50 |
| Total length: | | 36:38 |

== Personnel ==
Credits adapted from the liner notes of Beach House.

Beach House

- Victoria Legrand – vocals, various instruments
- Alex Scally – various instruments

Production

- Rob Girardi – recording, mixing
- Adam Cooke – recording
- Rusty Santos – mastering
- Elizabeth Flyntz – photography

== Release history ==
Release dates and formats for Beach House
| Region | Date | Label(s) | Format(s) | Ref. |
|---|---|---|---|---|
| Various | October 3, 2006 | Carpark; Mistletone; Bella Union | CD; LP; digital download | |
| United Kingdom | July 30, 2007 | Bella Union | CD; LP; digital download | |
