= PPP (song) =

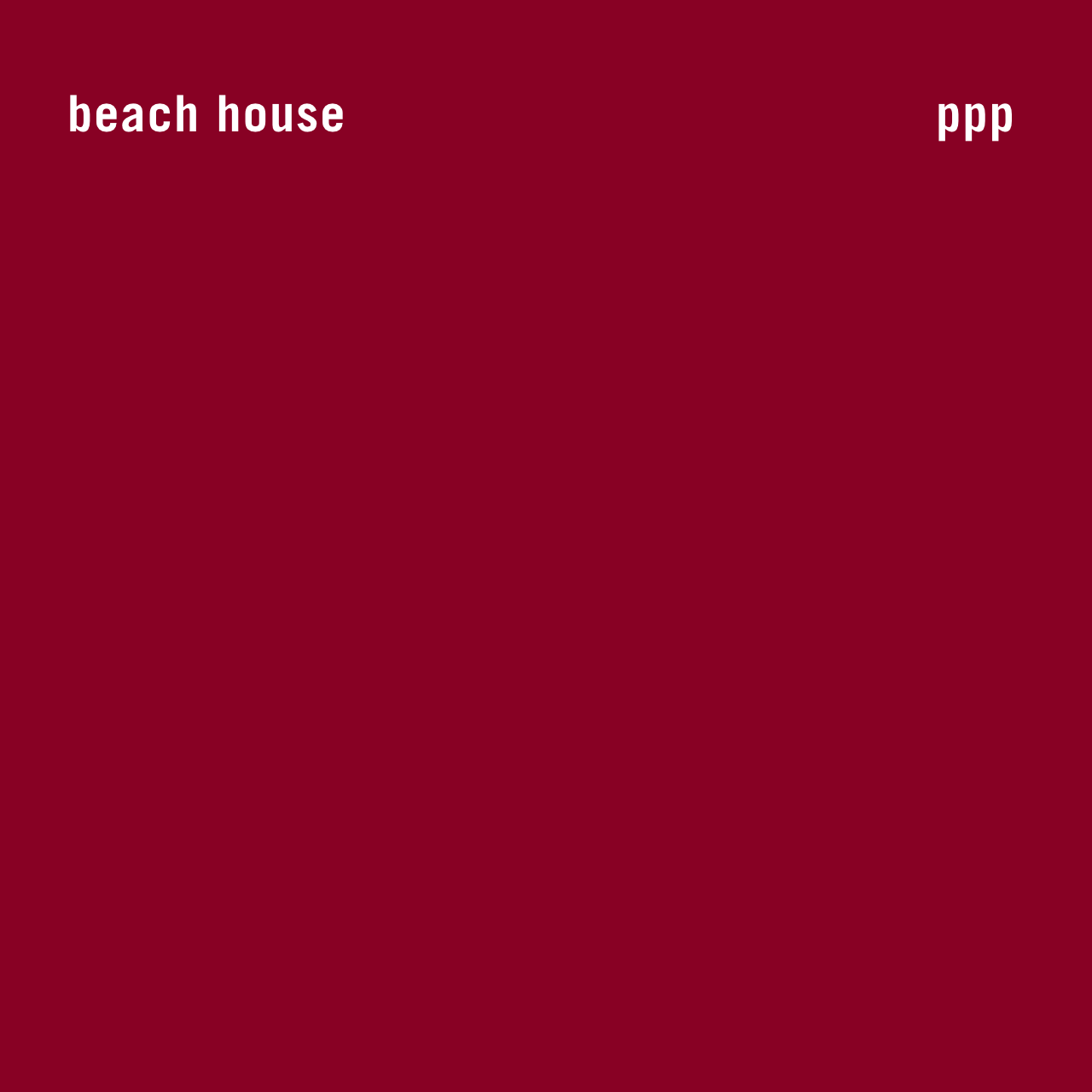

Promotional single by Beach House

from the album Depression Cherry
- Released: August 6, 2015
- Genre: Dream pop
- Length: 6:08 (album version); 4:00 (radio edit)
- Label: Sub Pop; Bella Union
- Songwriters: Victoria Legrand; Alex Scally
- Producers: Beach House; Chris Coady

"PPP" is a song by American dream pop band Beach House, from their fifth studio album, Depression Cherry (2015), originally released on August 28, 2015, through Sub Pop. It was previewed alongside "Beyond Love" during an interview with WBUR-FM's Here and Now on August 6, 2015.

== Release ==
"PPP" was previewed in an interview with WBUR-FM's Here and Now, along with "Beyond Love" and the previously released single "Sparks". The song would also be released on the band's website along with the said singles through their now-unavailable "Single Finder" feature, where one of the singles start playing based on the user's choice of three songs from the band's past catalogue.

== Composition ==
At 6:08 in length, "PPP" is written in 6/8 time and in the key of D♭.

== Critical reception ==
Upon release, "PPP" was profiled by publications such as Pitchfork Media, and Stereogum, with the latter describing the song as "gorgeous". As of August 2024, the song has been streamed over 70 million times on the popular music streaming service Spotify.

== Track listing ==
- UK CD single
1. "PPP" (radio edit) – 4:00

== Certifications ==
Certifications for "PPP"
Region	Certification	Certified units/sales
United States (RIAA)	Gold	500,000^{‡}
^{‡} Sales+streaming figures based on certification alone.
