= Tony, Caro and John =

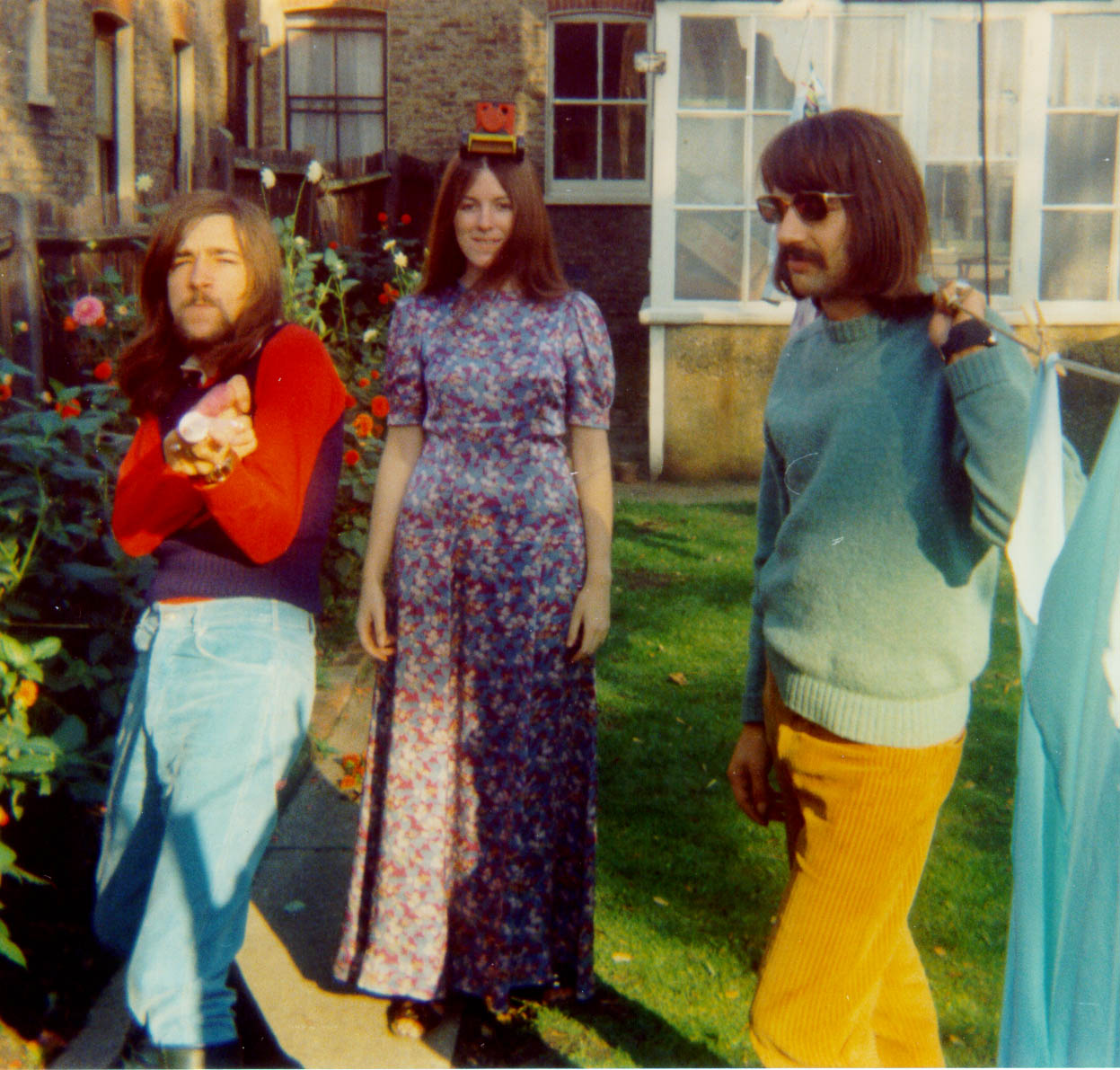

Background information
- Origin: Derby and Bristol, England
- Genres: Psychedelic folk, British folk rock
- Years active: 1972–present
- Labels: Shadoks, Gaarden, Drag City, Tapete
- Members: Tony Doré; Caroline 'Caro' Clark; John Clark
- Website: http://www.tonycaroandjohn.com/

Tony, Caro and John is a British psychedelic folk trio who recorded the album All on the First Day in 1972. The threesome took much of their inspiration from the Incredible String Band's eclectic strain of psychedelic folk, although songwriter and singer Tony Doré's compositions had a sound and voice of their own. The All Music Guide writes of the trio, "Tony, Caro and John were also wont to embellish their basic male-female vocal harmonies, and one electric guitar-one-acoustic-guitar-bass line-up, with weird touches of hippie psychedelia in the occasional electronic effects, tinkling percussion, flageolet (a type of small flute), wah-wah, and violin... Slightly sardonic but cheerfully playful, and with strong tunes effectively blending major and minor modes, they're more approachable for listeners with conventional rock and pop tastes than the Incredible String Band, or Incredible String Band-like bands of the period, such as Forest and Dr. Strangely Strange."

== Band history ==
"Sargasso Sea" (1972)
Sample of the song "Sargasso Sea" from the 1972 album All on the First Day.

"Cinquefoil and Tormentil" (1988)
Sample of the song "Cinquefoil and Tormentil" from the 2001 album Retrospect.

"Breakdown" (2005)
Sample of the song "Breakdown" from the album Fall Away Like Leaves.

Multi-instrumentalist Tony Doré and bassist John Clark were childhood friends in Derby, England, and played together on both the rock and folk circuit. After university they reunited in 1970, when John came to London to join Tony and Caroline (Caro), who had played university folk clubs together. All on the First Day was made in 1972 with almost no budget and primitive equipment, recorded on John's 2-track; they could overdub in mono only by re-recording the backing track at the same time. They self-pressed the LP in an edition of only 100 copies, with the home-grown nature of the product emphasized by individually spray-painted covers.

Expanding the band line-up with Simon Burrett on lead guitar, Jonny Owen on Harmonica and Rod Jones on keyboards, Tony, Caro and John continued on the college circuit for a little while under the name "Forever and Ever" but the gigging stopped in the late seventies, when families and careers took precedence. The band continued to jam together, and to record in John Clark's multi-track studio.

Then in 2001, Tony Doré was contacted by Shadoks Music in Germany, when it transpired that there was an underground following for the All on the First Day album, and copies were changing hands for substantial sums of money. The band agreed that Shadoks could produce a limited release of vinyl albums from the original master, and at the same time release the album on CD. The release included five bonus tracks recorded around the time of All on the First Day. Almost simultaneously the band released some of the studio tracks recorded since All on the First Day, as the limited edition CD-R album Retrospect under the Forever and Ever band name. This was available online.

Bassist John Clark died in 2005.

Following the wider release of the band's material, Doré’s 1972 composition "The Snowdon Song" was covered by the American dream pop duo Beach House, on their eponymous 2006 debut album. Beach House changed the key and time signature, altered the lyrics, and changed the title to "Lovelier Girl", with Doré nor the trio given no attribution; they worked with Beach House’s management on authorship and royalty issues, with Doré now given writing credits.

== Recent events ==
Doré continues to write songs, and between 2006 and 2010 recorded 13 new tracks which were finalized in 2010 in Rod Jones’ studio in France. This collection, Fall Away Like Leaves by Tony Doré and Friends, was released digitally in 2011 by Gaarden Records of Portland, Oregon.

Gaarden have also reissued All on the First Day as digital downloads and as limited editions on green and maroon vinyl. In 2012, Tony, Caro and John had their first major label release with the album Blue Clouds on the Chicago-based record label, Drag City. This album, a joint release with Gaarden and Galactic Zoo, was made up of rare unreleased and live tracks from the All On The First Day era.

In November 2017 All On The First Day was again re-released, in vinyl and CD format, this time by the German label Tapete. Tony and Caro announced that they were going to tour again in early 2018 in Germany and the UK to promote the re-release – the full scale band tour since the 1970s. They will be joined by Jonny Owen (Caro’s brother) of Walking Wounded, on harmonica and vocals, and Simon Burrett of the Blue Bishops on lead guitar.

In late 2017, Tony and Simon have completed recording a new collection of songs, The Festival At The End Of The World under the band name Nation of Strangers, for early 2018 release.

== Discography ==
- All on the First Day (1972). Self-released, vinyl.
- All on the First Day (2001). Shadoks Records. Re-release with bonus tracks, vinyl and CD.
- Retrospect (2001). Self-released under name Forever and Ever, CD-R.
- All on the First Day (2010). Gaarden Records. Digital release.
- All on the First Day (2012). Media Arte Records (South Korea). Limited edition CD Mini-LP.
- Fall Away Like Leaves (2011). Gaarden records. Digital release under name Tony Doré and Friends.
- Blue Clouds (2012). Drag City, Gaarden and Galactic Zoo Records. Vinyl and digital release.
- All on the First Day (2017). Tapete Records. Vinyl and CD. Digital available late 2018.

Compilation appearances

- Love, Peace & Poetry, British Psychedelic Music (2001). Shadoks Records. Vinyl and CD. Features track "There Are No Greater Heroes".
- Dust On the Nettles: A journey through British underground Folk scene 1967 - 1972, (2015) Cherry Red Records. Features track "There Are No Greater Heroes"
