= Tim Jonze =

British music journalist

Tim Jonze (born 4 February 1980) is a British music journalist for NME, Vice, Dazed and Confused and The Guardian. He is associate editor of Guardian Culture.

Jonze has reviewed a number of songs and albums, and has interviewed Jake Gyllenhaal, Lily Allen, Bill Drummond, Samantha Fox, Morrissey, Gary Lineker, Ren Harvieu, Ricky Wilson, and Ben Howard.

In December 2017 Jonze was diagnosed with a rare blood cancer called essential thrombocythemia.
