= Pitchfork Music Festival 2007 =

Music festival

- Dates: July 13–15, 2007
- Locations: Union Park, Chicago, United States
- Website: pitchforkmusicfestival.com

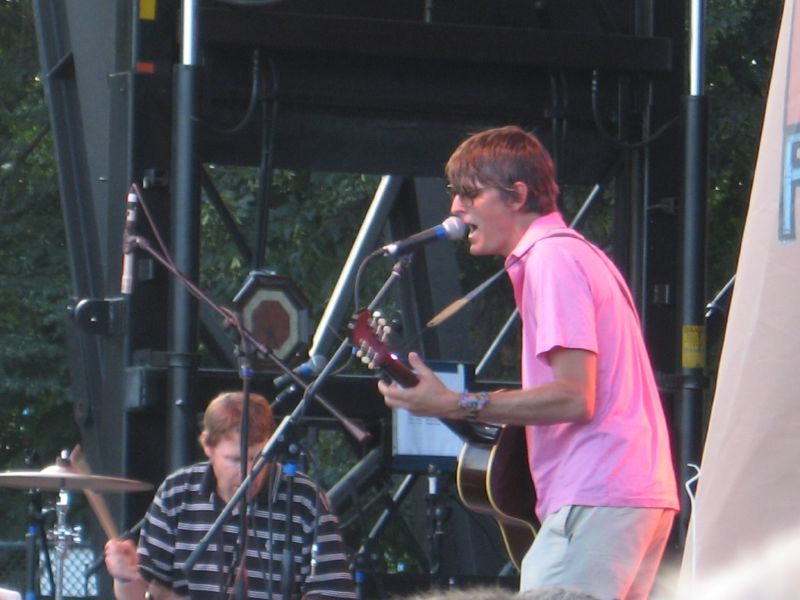
Bob Nastanovich and Stephen Malkmus performing at the 2007 Pitchfork Music Festival.

The Pitchfork Music Festival 2007 was held on July 13 to 15, 2007 at the Union Park, Chicago, United States.

On Friday, all of the performing bands played all the songs from one of their classic albums as a part of Don't Look Back concert series, a collaboration between Pitchfork and British promoters All Tomorrow's Parties. During her set, musician and performance artist Yoko Ono performed "Mulberry," a song about her time in the countryside after the Japanese collapse in World War II, for only the third time in her life, with Thurston Moore from Sonic Youth; Ono had previously performed the song once with her husband John Lennon and once with her son Sean Lennon.

== Lineup ==
Artists listed from latest to earliest set times.

Aluminum Stage
Friday, July 13	Saturday, July 14	Sunday, July 15
Sonic Youth (Note: Sonic Youth performed a full set of their fifth studio album Daydream Nation.); GZA (Note: GZA performed a full set of his sophomore studio album Liquid Swords.)	Yoko Ono; Clipse; Iron & Wine; Grizzly Bear; Califone	De La Soul; Of Montreal; Jamie Lidell; Junior Boys; The Ponys

Connector Stage
Friday, July 13	Saturday, July 14	Sunday, July 15
Slint (Note: Slint performed a full set of their final studio album Spiderland.)	Cat Power & Dirty Delta Blues; Mastodon; Battles; Voxtrot; The Twilight Sad	The New Pornographers; Stephen Malkmus; The Sea and Cake; Menomena; Deerhunter

Balance Stage
Saturday, July 14	Sunday, July 15
Girl Talk; Dan Deacon; Oxford Collapse; Professor Murder; Fujiya & Miyagi; Beach House; William Parker Quartet; Ken Vandermark's Powerhouse Sound	Klaxons; The Field; Cadence Weapon; The Cool Kids; Craig Taborn's Junk Magic; Nomo; Brightblack Morning Light; Fred Lonberg-Holm's Lightbox Orchestra
