= Studio in the Country =

Recording studio in Washington Parish, Louisiana, United States

Coordinates: 30°50′6″N 89°50′5″W

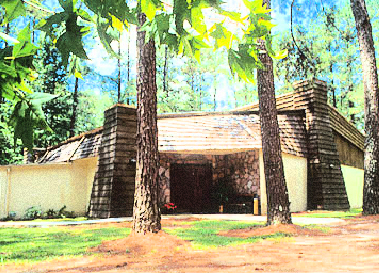
Studio in the Country

Studio in the Country is a recording studio located at 21443 Hwy 436 in Washington Parish, Louisiana.

The studio has been in operation since 1972. It was conceived and originally owned by recording engineer William S. "Bleu" Evans. It sits on a 26-acre pine forest located near New Orleans, LA between Bogalusa, LA and Varnado, LA. The studio is approximately 60 miles north of eastern New Orleans. Construction and design was overseen by Bleu Evans with significant contributions by Tom Hidley of Westlake Audio, George Augspurger, Lee Peterzell, Tom Knight and Ron Balmer. Eugene Foster bought the studio in 1979, and later sold it in 1997 to current owner Debra Farmer.

Numerous multi-platinum records were recorded, partially recorded or mixed at Studio in the Country, including classic albums by Kansas such as Leftoverture and Point of Know Return, each of which contained hits – "Carry On Wayward Son" (which reached No. 11 on the Billboard Hot 100) on the former and Top 10 single "Dust in the Wind" on the latter. Other platinum albums from Studio in the Country include Save His Soul by Blues Traveler, Smells Like Children by Marilyn Manson, Boats, Beaches, Bars and Ballads by Jimmy Buffett, Heartbreak Station by Cinderella, and the 11× platinum Dirty Dancing soundtrack.

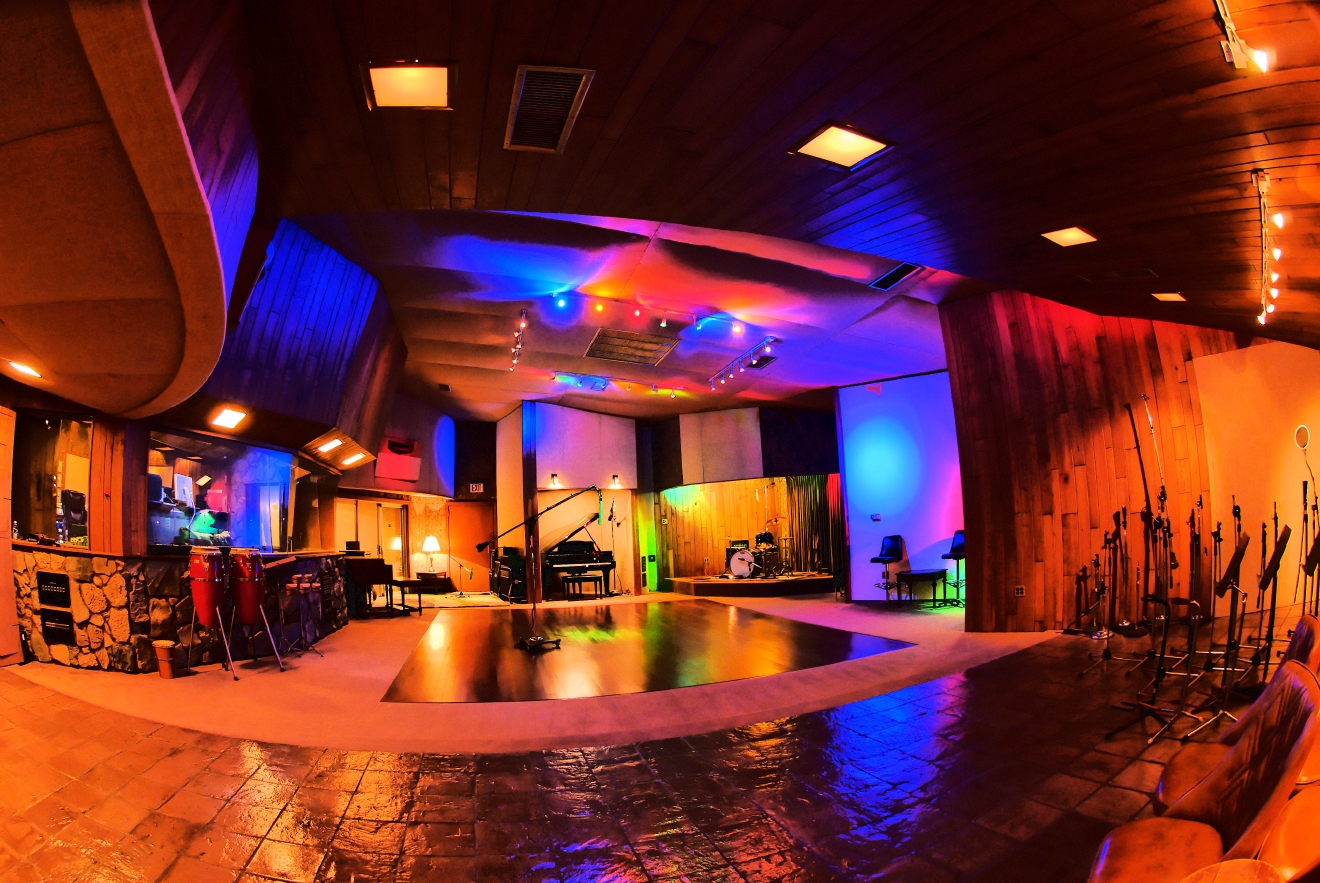
Studio Interior (2010)

Additional work done at Studio in the Country includes Stevie Wonder's Journey Through the Secret Life of Plants, The Hungry Years by Willie Nelson, the Jack Nitzsche-produced The Neville Brothers, and Fiyo on the Bayou by The Neville Brothers, Louis Prima Meets Robin Hood by Louis Prima, The Nitty Gritty Dirt Band's An American Dream, the certified-gold Inspiration by Frankie Beverly and Maze, Thunderhead's self-titled first album (produced by Johnny Winter), Zebra's certified-gold self-titled debut album Zebra, Rock'n'Roll Gumbo by Professor Longhair, Pete Fountain's Alive in New Orleans, The Wild Magnolias and They Call Us Wild by The Wild Magnolias, Peter Yarrow's That's Enough For Me, numerous albums by Louisiana's LeRoux (including the hit single "New Orleans Ladies"), Lonesome Road by Doc Watson, Betty Davis' Is It Love Or Desire, High Life by Frankie Miller, "Spanish Doors" from the Adorata EP by The Gutter Twins, American Patchwork by Anders Osborne, and My Feet Can't Fail Me Now by The Dirty Dozen Brass Band.

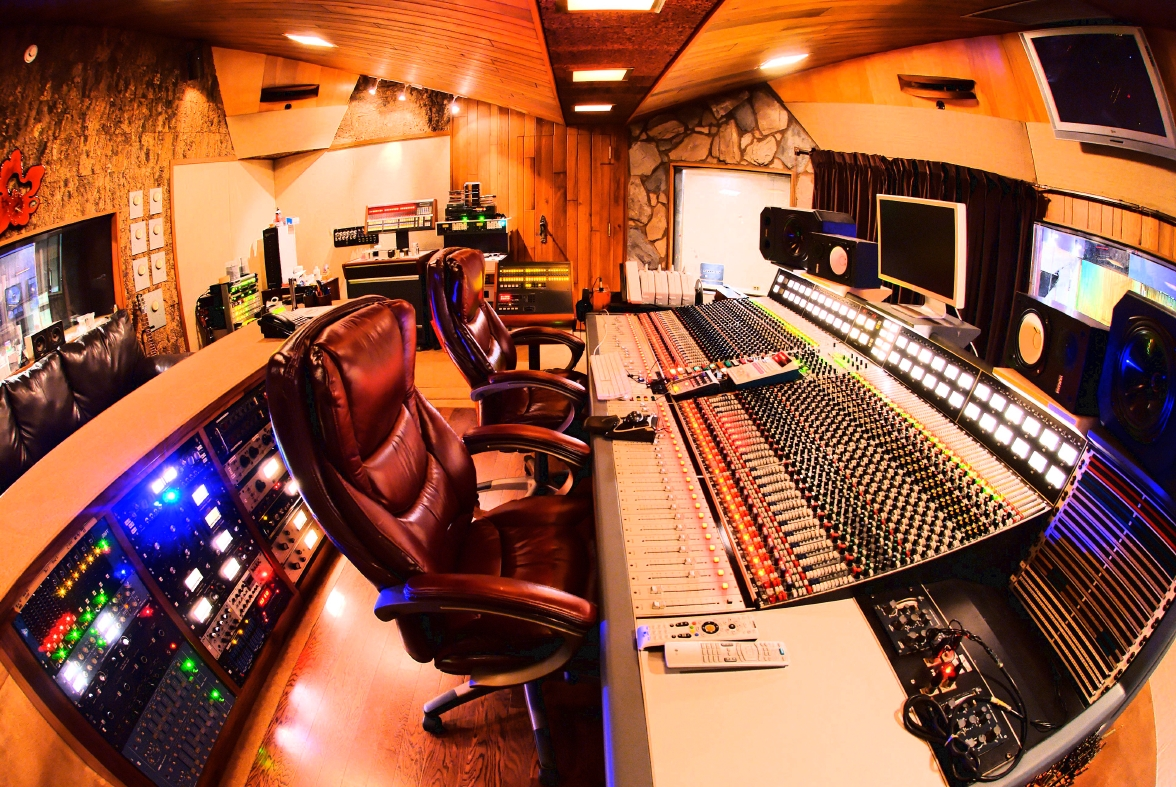
Control Room (2010)

Albums including Grammy Award winner I'm Here, Bogalusa Boogie and Frenchin' the Boogie by Clifton Chenier were recorded there and numerous albums by Clarence "Gatemouth" Brown, including Blackjack and the Grammy-winning Alright Again were also recorded and mixed at Studio in the Country.

Other artists who have used the studio include Ani DiFranco, Edward Sharpe and the Magnetic Zeros, Greg Dulli, The Twilight Singers, Mandrill, Tony Joe White, Zachary Richard, Wayne Newton, Dash Rip Rock, Melanie, The Scoundrels (UK), C.C. Adcock and Revolution Mother, whose lead singer is professional skateboarder Mike Vallely. 2015 saw the release of two albums by the band Beach House, Depression Cherry and Thank Your Lucky Stars.

The studio has one of the last functional free-standing echo chambers in the world. It was one of the last major all-analog recording facilities until adding Pro Tools HD in recent years, though the Studer two-inch and half-inch tape machines are still in use.

In 2009 New Orleans' Offbeat awarded Studio in the Country "Best Recording Studio in Louisiana" for 2008 as well as awarding Ben Mumphrey "Best Studio Engineer in Louisiana".

In November 2010 the installation of a vintage Neve 8068 recording console was completed. The 32-channel board was most recently in use at Allaire Studios in New York.
