= Manuel Calderon (musician) =

- Born: El Paso, Texas
- Occupations: Producer; Mixer; Recording Engineer
- Website: comanchesound.com

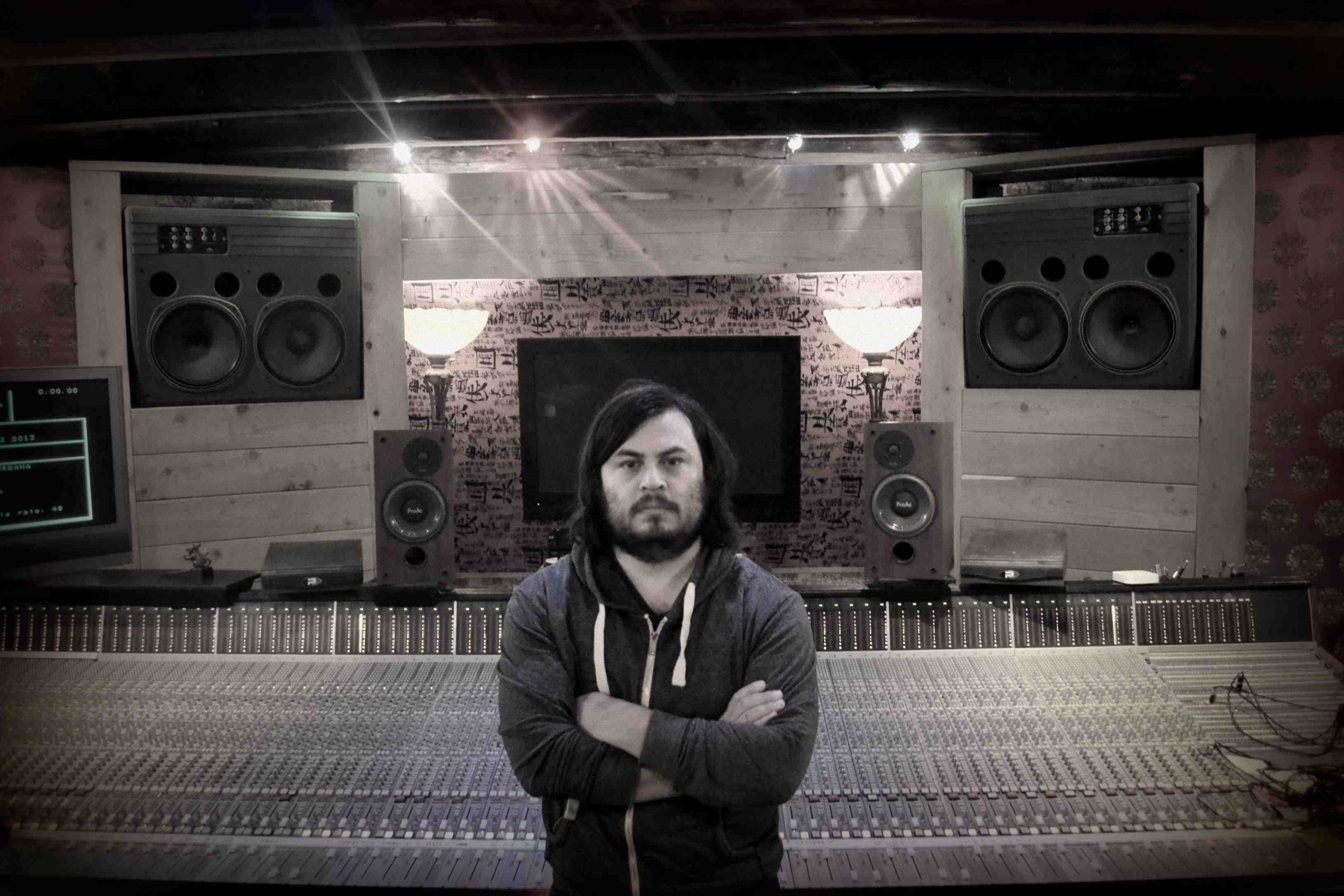
Calderon at Sonic Ranch Recording Studios

Manuel Calderon, also known as Comanche Sound, is an American producer, recording and mixing engineer from the border cities of El Paso, Texas and Ciudad Juarez, Chihuahua.

== Education ==
Calderon attended Full Sail University in Orlando, Florida. After graduating in 2005, he started an internship at Westlake Recording Studios in Los Angeles, where he later became a recording engineer. He started his early recording practices here and worked with artists such as Herbie Hancock, Josh Groban, Annie Lennox and Michael Bolton, and producers like Humberto Gatica, Glenn Ballard and Quincy Jones.

== Career ==
Calderon decided to move back to the border of El Paso, Texas in 2009 to work as an engineer at Sonic Ranch. Some of the artists he worked with included Enrique Bunbury, Zoe, Motel, Animal Collective, Portugal. The Man, David Garza, Nina Diaz (Girl in a Coma), Yeah Yeah Yeahs and Gogol Bordello. Calderon subsequently opened his own music production company called "Comanche Sound"

In 2011, Manuel met Hector Carreon while working at Sonic Ranch, later forming a band called "The Chamanas" in 2013. The Chamanas were nominated for a Latin Grammy in 2016 as "Best New Artist" almost a year after the release of their debut album Once Once. The album was produced and engineered by Manuel Calderon and mainly written by Hector Carreon.

Calderon currently plays bass for The Chamanas and has toured nationally and internationally collaborating with artists and bands such as Fernando Milagros, Portugal. The Man, Odesza, Los Angeles Negros, producer Dave Sitek (TV on the Radio) and opened shows for Beach House, Enjambre and George Clinton The Chamanas have also performed at international festivals such as Vive Latino, LAMC, and SXSW.
