= Beach House =

American dream pop band

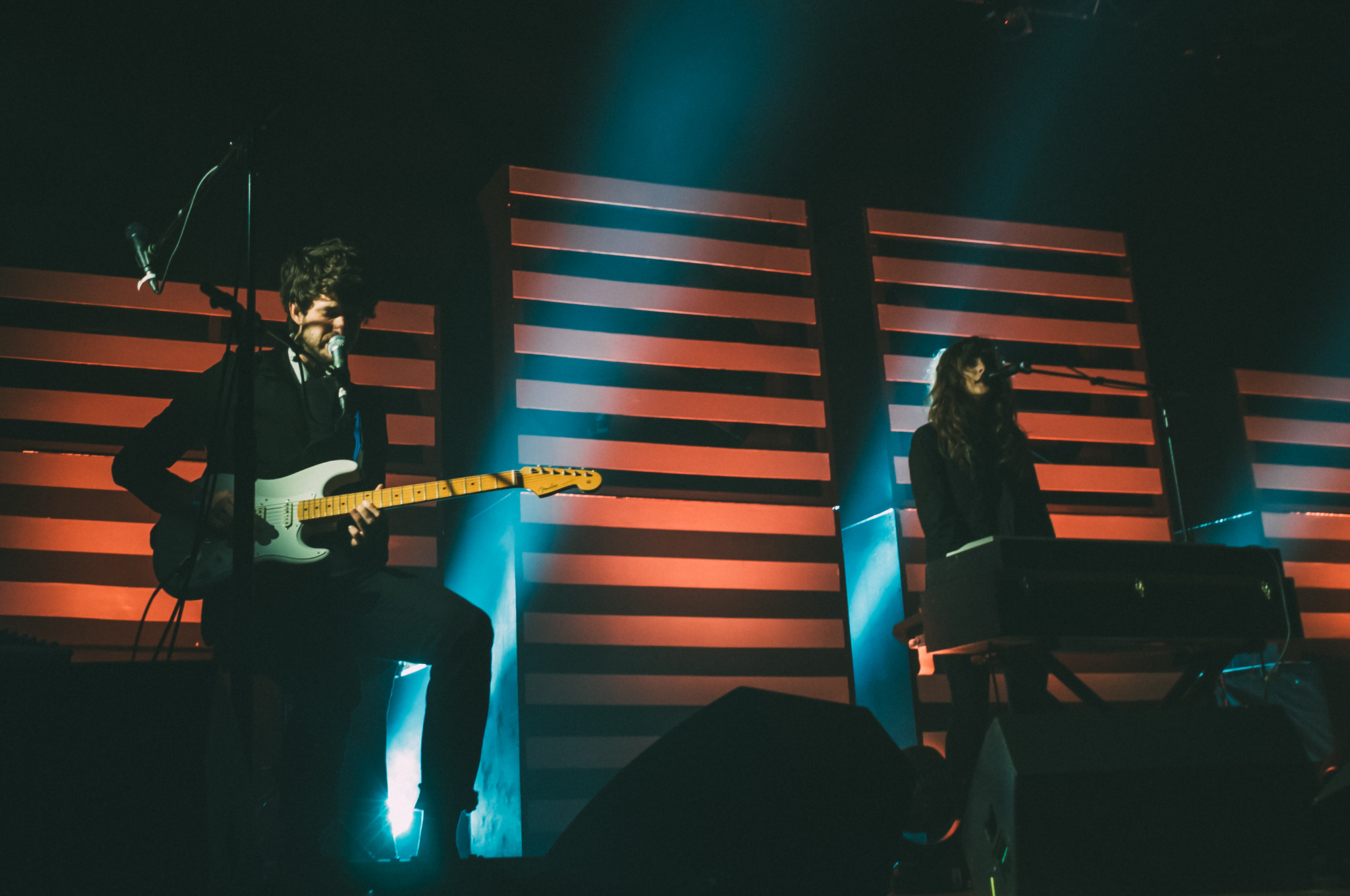
- Beach House performing live in 2012

Background information
- Origin: Baltimore, Maryland, US
- Genres: Dream pop; indie rock; shoegaze
- Works: Discography
- Years active: 2004–present
- Labels: Carpark; Bella Union; Sub Pop; Mistletone; Arts & Crafts México; Lemon Glow Records
- Members: Victoria Legrand; Alex Scally; James Barone
- Website: beachhousebaltimore.com

Beach House is an American dream pop band formed in Baltimore in 2004, consisting of current members Victoria Legrand (vocals, keyboards) and Alex Scally (guitar, keyboard, backing vocals, drum programming), who both met in Baltimore's indie scene, and James Barone (drums, percussion, bass), who joined as an official member in 2022 after touring prominently with them since 2016. The band has been regarded by journalists and critics as rejuvenating the genre of dream pop for newer generations.

Prior to forming Beach House, Legrand and Scally met in Baltimore, and were members of another band, Daggerhearts, which disbanded in 2005 due to dysfunctionality. Thereafter, both decided to write music together, as their wish to form a band. They first gained international recognition in 2006, after their song "Apple Orchard" was featured on Pitchfork's Infinite Mixtape series, subsequently releasing their self-titled debut album in October of that year, through Carpark Records. They released their second studio album Devotion in February 2008, which became their first album to debut on the US Billboard 200 and their final release under Carpark. In 2009, they signed onto Sub Pop, which allowed them to promote their third studio album Teen Dream, which was released to critical acclaim in January 2010; it is often considered their breakthrough album.

They followed the success of Teen Dream by releasing their fourth studio album Bloom in May 2012, which was met with similar acclaim and commercially successful, peaking at number seven on the Billboard 200. They later released two albums in 2015; Depression Cherry was released in August and peaked at number eight on the Billboard 200, while Thank Your Lucky Stars was surprise-released two months later. The band shifted their musical style on their seventh album 7 (2018), after releasing a compilation album in 2017. The band gained more attention in 2021, after their 2015 promotional single "Space Song" went viral on social platforms, primarily TikTok. In February 2022, the band released their eighth studio album Once Twice Melody, which was released in four chapters starting November 2021.

== History ==
=== 2004–2007: Formation and self-titled album ===
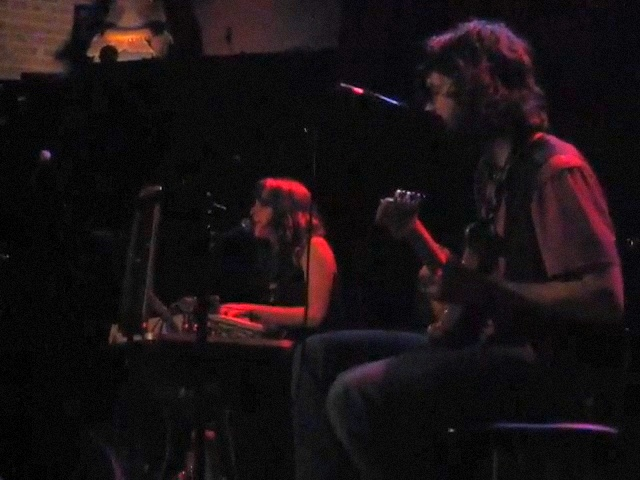
Beach House performing at the High Noon Saloon in June 2007

In 2004, Victoria Legrand moved from her birthplace of Paris to Baltimore after being dissatisfied with theater school, and because a colleague who would play music with her at Vassar College, where she graduated from in 2003, was also living there. Through that same friend, Dirck, Legrand was introduced to Alex Scally later that year; they first met at the porch of Scally's family home and Legrand handed him a CD of music. By the second time they met, they began recording music at Legrand's basement. At around this time, they were both also members of a band called Daggerhearts, which would break up in 2005, due to dysfunctionality and a lack of musical direction. Despite the band's split-up, both Legrand and Scally would continue writing music together, wanting to form a band. He invited Legrand to his house to try a variety of organs he had used on 4-track recordings, kept in storage, and both of them got along well. Aside from creating music at the time, Scally worked with his father as a carpenter, while Legrand worked as a waitress at a Mexican restaurant.

The duo began recording their first album in 2005 in Scally's basement, which was recorded on a 4-track recording tape over a two-day period. The budget for recording the album was reportedly about $1,000. During a hangout, they wrote their first song, "Saltwater". They first performed at Baltimore's Talking Head Club on November 13, 2005, initially performing under the names Planetarium and Beach House on the Moon. They eventually shortened the latter to Beach House for brevity, a name which they say came from "House on the Hill," one of the songs they had written at the time. During these discussions, they also suggested plant-based names such as Wisteria, and other "stupid stuff". In an interview with Pitchfork, Legrand addressed their being a two-member status thus: "[I]t's a way to challenge ourselves: What do you do when it's just the two of you? ... [O]ne of the reasons this has been such a fulfilling experience for me is that with two people, it's so much easier to achieve things that feel exciting and new." On August 22, 2006, their song "Apple Orchard" was included as the 34th entry on Pitchfork's Infinite Mixtape series. On October 3, 2006, the band released their self-titled debut album, Beach House, through Carpark Records, and was met with positive reviews from critics. It was named the 16th best album of 2006 by Pitchfork.

In January 2007, the band released a music video for "Master of None." They released another video for the track in July 2007, which coincided with an official release of their self-titled album in the United Kingdom. Around the same month, Beach House announced that they would be touring with Papercuts on some dates. On July 14, the duo performed at the 2007 Pitchfork Music Festival. In June 2007, Beach House revealed, in an interview with Pitchfork, that they were working on their second studio album, adding that they were again working with Rob Girardi at the newly established Lord Baltimore Recording studio. In October of that year, they officially announced the album and its title as Devotion.

=== 2008–2010: Devotion, Teen Dream and breakthrough ===
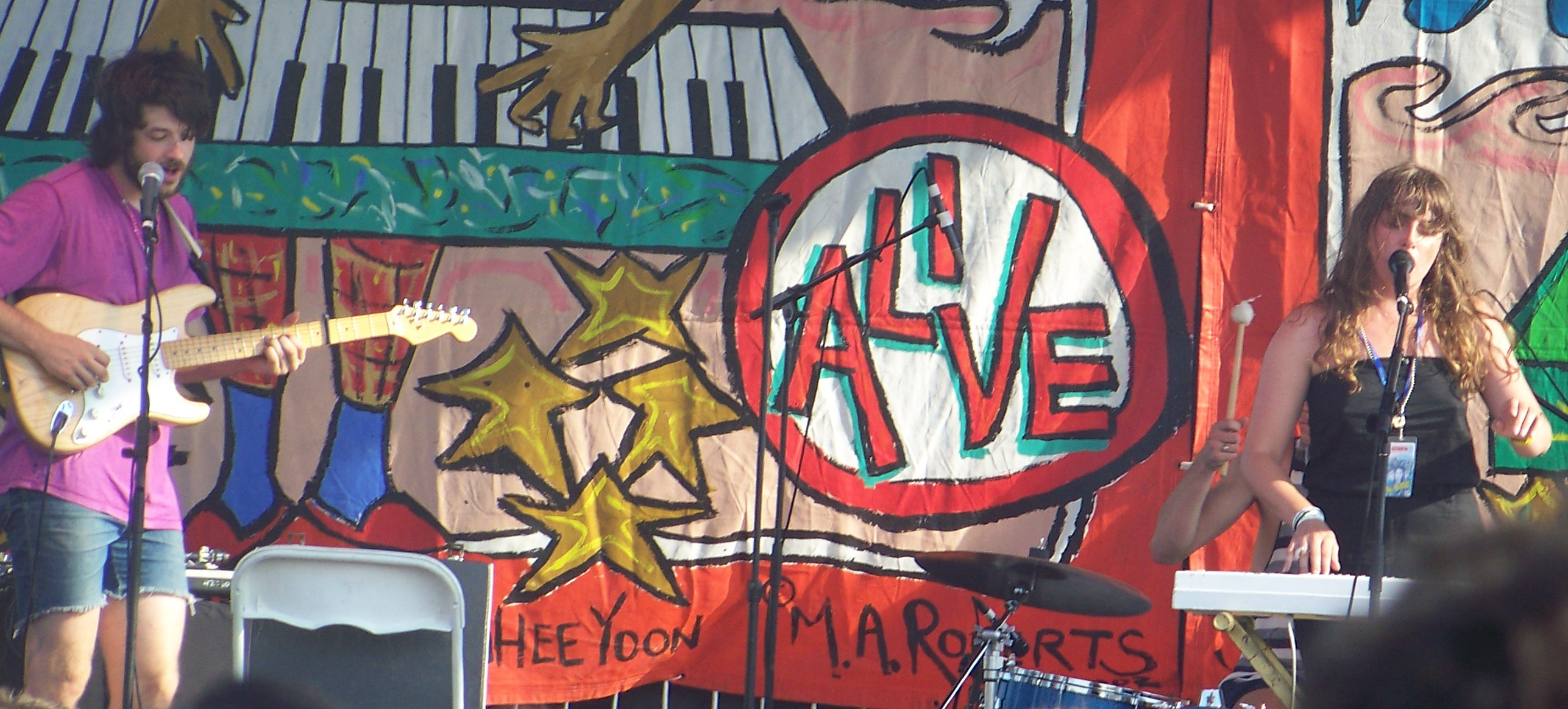
Beach House performing at Siren Music Festival in July 2008

Beach House's second album, Devotion, was released on February 26, 2008. It was received with similar acclaim as the first album and was included in Pitchfork's Best Albums of 2008 list. It became their first album to appear on the US Billboard 200, debuting at number 195, selling roughly 5,000 copies within its first week of release. The duo began writing the album within the first half of the year, starting the recording process in July 2007, with the usage of an old Yamaha keyboard that became the "main instrument of the band", according to lead vocalist Victoria Legrand. In August 2008, the band announced that they would release their debut single "Used to Be" on October 21 of that year as a 7-inch vinyl release, along with a 4-track demo of "Apple Orchard" as its B-side. Recorded over the summer of 2008, "Used to Be" was streamed online early on September 22, 2008.

In February 2009, Beach House recorded a cover of Queen's "Play the Game", which was only released on the iTunes Store version of the Red Hot Organization's compilation album Dark Was The Night. That same year, the band began writing their third studio album. Aside, Legrand provided backing vocals on indie rock band Grizzly Bear's song "Two Weeks", which they later performed together on The Tonight Show With Conan O'Brien in October of that year. She later collaborated with the band again by providing vocals to "Slow Life", the band's contribution to the soundtrack for the film Twilight: New Moon. In September of that year, it was announced that the duo had signed onto independent record label Sub Pop, marking their departure from Carpark, where they released their first two albums, along with a confirmation that the duo were recording their third studio album. In October of that same year, the duo announced their third studio album, Teen Dream. With the record deal, they were able to produce a DVD version of the album, meeting its expectations, as well as hire a producer, Chris Coady. The album was recorded at Dreamland Studios in Hurley, New York. On November 17, the band released "Norway", the lead single from Teen Dream, on their website as a free download. The song was originally written while on a train in Norway in 2008.

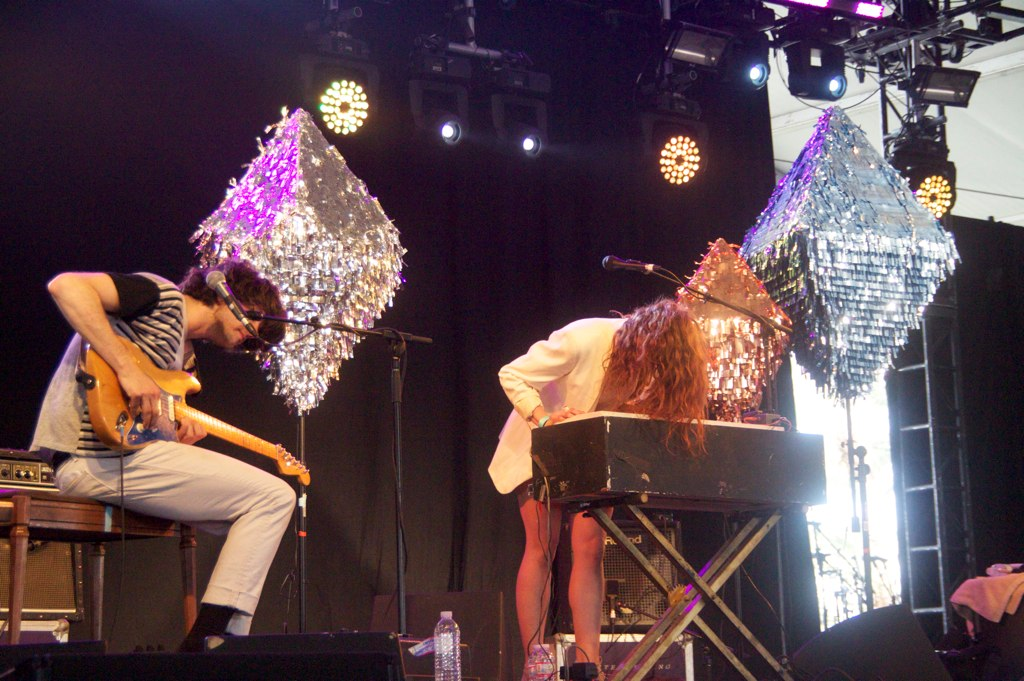
Beach House performing at Coachella 2010

Despite Teen Dream being leaked on the Internet days after the release of "Norway", it was later officially released through Sub Pop on January 26, 2010, becoming their first album release through the label, and was met with critical acclaim upon release. It contains a re-recorded version of their 2008 single "Used to Be". The album's unitedly positive reception garnered the band a larger fan base, with Jay-Z and Beyoncé being spotted at the band's Coachella 2010 set. On February 1, 2010, the band released their Daytrotter Session EP, which features live renditions of four songs from Teen Dream. Of the success of the album and it being dubbed the group's "breakout" record by numerous publications, Legrand stated: "I see this as just another step in a direction. I would not want to say that 2010 will be our year, necessarily, I hope it’s just another year in which we do good work. I don’t want to be defined by this year, I want it to just be a beginning." The album was also included in the book 1001 Albums You Must Hear Before You Die.

On August 24, 2010, the band released their six-track iTunes Session EP, featuring a new previously unreleased song, "White Moon", along with five renditions of songs from Teen Dream and "Gila". In October 2010, the band contributed a charity T-shirt for the Yellow Bird Project to raise money for the House of Ruth women's shelter in Maryland for victims of domestic violence. On December 16, 2010, the band released "I Do Not Care for the Winter Sun" on their website for free. The song was written and recorded in 2010 during a break between tours after they felt "incredibly grateful" to their fans. In 2011, the band revealed that they were planning on working on their fourth album, with Scally stating that, as soon as they finish going on tour for Teen Dream, they were going to "wait for the writing process [of their next album] to be really exciting and inspired". That same year, they revealed that they have already written a few songs for it while touring.

=== 2012–2014: Bloom ===
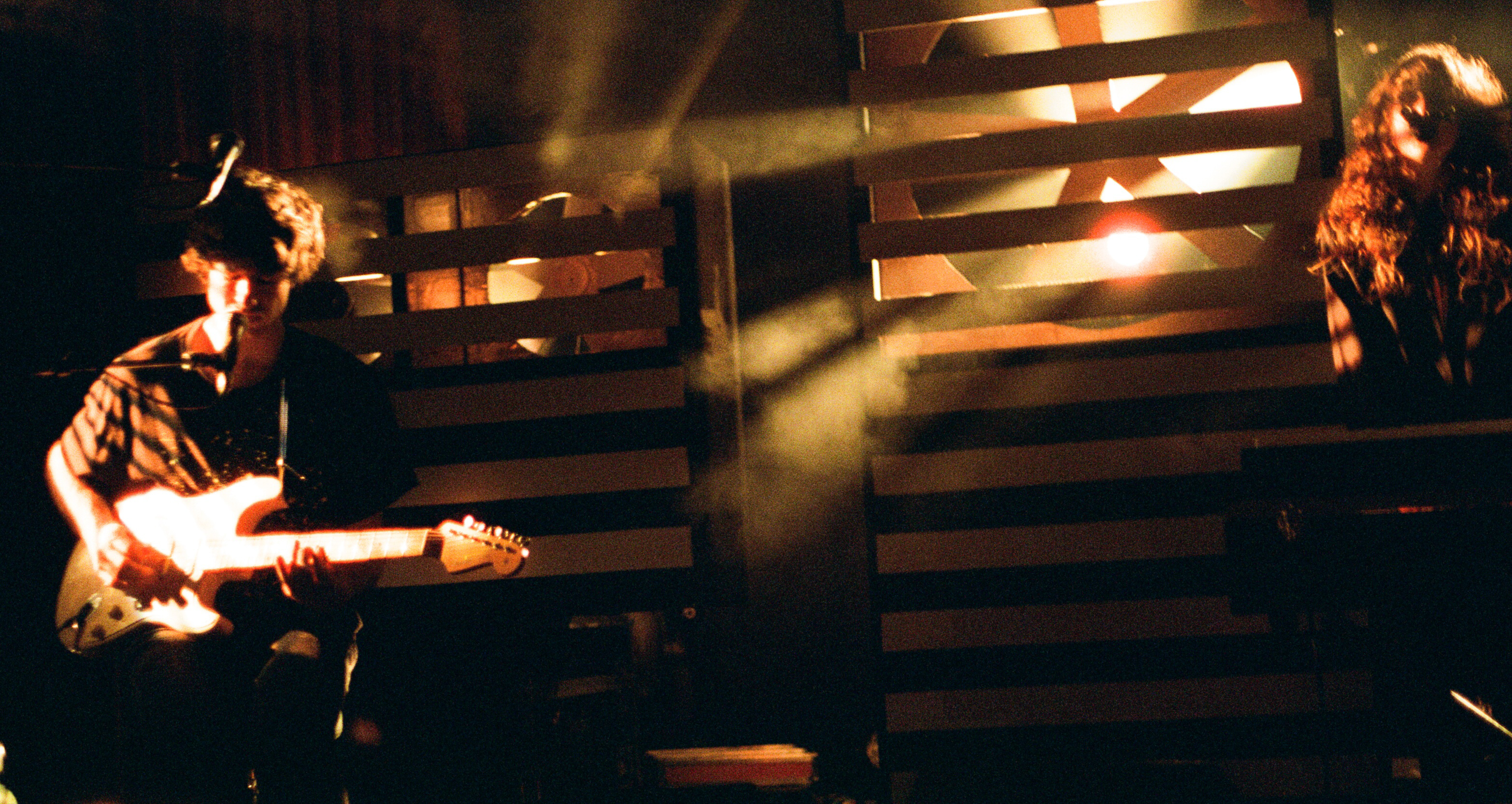
Beach House performing at The Orange Peel in Asheville, North Carolina in 2012

In January 2012, a photo of the band was published on the Electric Lady Studios Facebook page with the caption "Just wrapped the new Beach House record in Studio A... such a rad record // band," raising speculation that their fourth studio album was completed there. The photo was later taken down, with Chris Cantalini of Gorilla vs. Bear revealing on Twitter that Sub Pop told them that Electric Lady "jumped the gun" when publishing the photo. The following month, it was reported that the duo's fourth studio album would drop in May 15, of the same year; its alleged tracklist was revealed and the album was reportedly titled Bloom. On March 7, 2012, the band streamed a new song, "Myth", on their website, confirmed as the lead single from Bloom. On March 8, the next day, the band officially confirmed the release of Bloom and its tracklist, also announcing tour dates in support. The album was recorded at Sonic Ranch in Tornillo, Texas, and features production by Chris Coady for the second time. The second single from the album, "Lazuli", was released on April 13, 2012, and was released as a 7-inch single, with "Equal Mind" as its B-side, as a Record Store Day exclusive release.

Bloom was released on May 15, 2012, by Sub Pop, and was met with praise from contemporary music critics upon release. The album debuted at number seven on the US Billboard 200, selling 41,000 copies in its first week; it became the duo's best selling album on the chart. Supporting US tour dates for the album were also announced, with its start date being on May 4, 2012, at Charlottesville, and its end date on July 23, 2012, in New York City. Soon after touring, dates for a supporting international fall tour, marketed as the Frightened Eyes tour, were announced, commencing on September 13, 2012, in Richmond, Virginia, and concluding on November 19, 2012, in Amsterdam. At around this month, a British advert for automobile manufacturing company Volkswagen was published, which features a song that was referred to as a rip-off of the band's song "Take Care", from their previous album Teen Dream (2010). The band responded, stating that the advertising agency had attempted to license the song from them, politely declining. The band also stated that fans should not direct their comments to the company, but to the advertising agency instead. In June 2012, Beach House was featured on the cover of Issue 80 of the Fader. A music video for "Lazuli" was released on June 6, 2012, and was directed by Allen Cordell, who also directed the video for "Walk in the Park" from Teen Dream. On November 14, 2012, the duo released the accompanying music video for "Wild", featuring video direction from Johan Renck and a series of violent and sexual scenes.

On January 1, 2013, Beach House released the official video for "New Year", which features time-lapse video recordings, which were filmed by Manuel Calderon, of the album's recording sessions at Sonic Ranch. The duo explained its concept, "It's more of a home video thing, not a music video... we just thought these moments and the memories they involve fit this song". The band released a short film, Forever Still, on February 4, 2013. The film, directed by the band and Max Goldman, was inspired by Pink Floyd's Live at Pompeii and features the band performing songs from Bloom at various sites around Tornillo, Texas, where the album was recorded. The idea for the film came from the band's desire to make quality promotional content they could control artistically: "We had previously been involved in too many live sessions, radio tapings, photoshoots, etc., where the outcome was far below our personal artistic standards. We also felt a need to distance ourselves from the 'content' culture of the internet that rewards quantity over quality and shock over nuance." A music video for "Wishes" directed by Eric Wareheim and starring Ray Wise was released on March 7, 2013. In March 2014, the band released the song "Saturn Song", which exclusively appeared on the Lefse Records compilation album The Space Project. In July 2014, the band announced the Northern Exposure Tour, with concert dates taking place in Alaska and Canada.

=== 2015–2017: Depression Cherry and Thank Your Lucky Stars ===
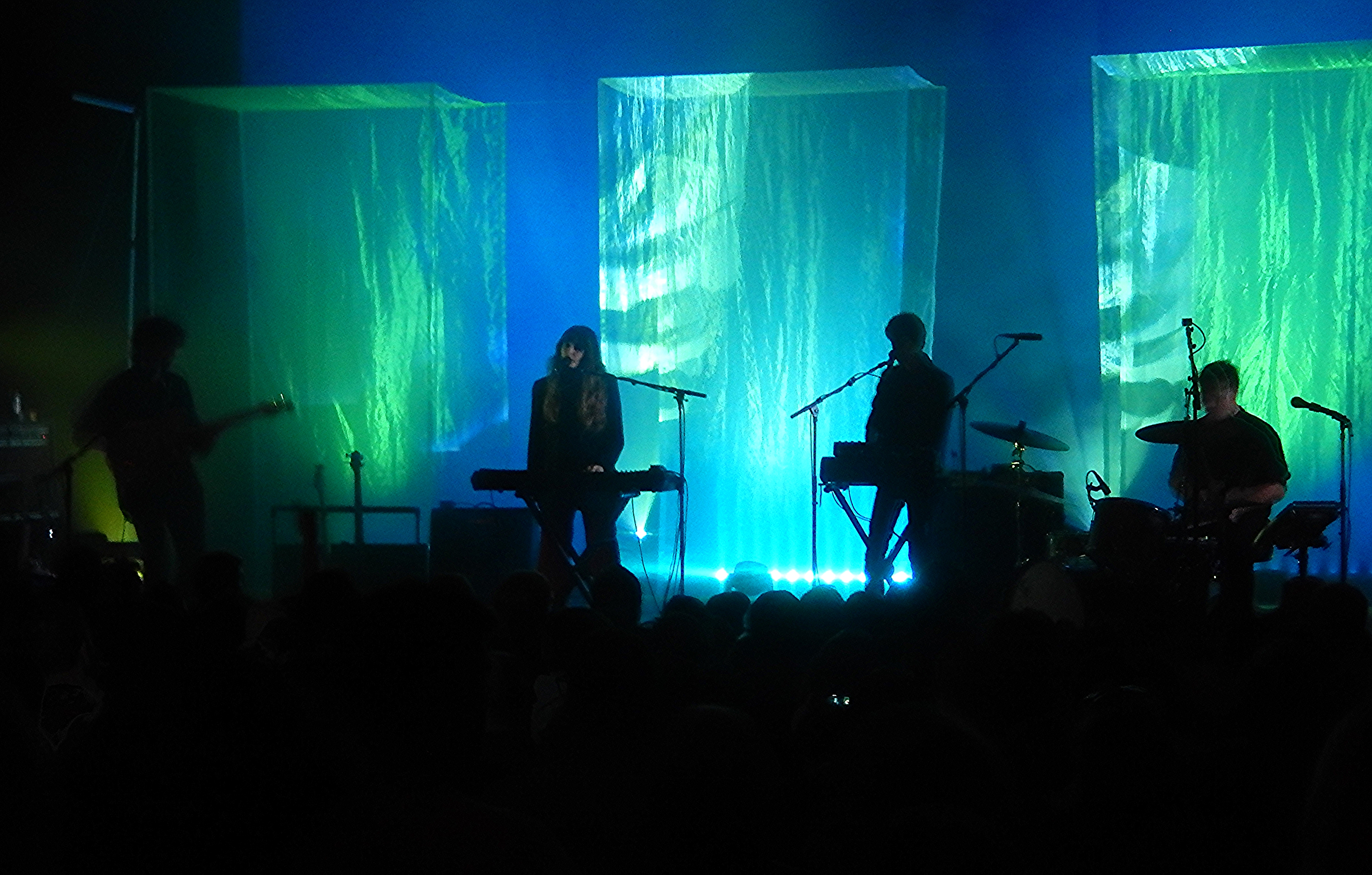
Beach House performing at the Pabst Theatre in Milwaukee in 2015

On May 26, 2015, Beach House announced their fifth studio album, Depression Cherry, additionally revealing its tracklist and album artwork, along with dates for its supporting world tour. Talking about the direction of the new album, the band said in a press release, "In general, this record shows a return to simplicity, with songs structured around a melody and a few instruments, with live drums playing a far lesser role." On June 26, 2015, the band announced on Twitter that they would perform a new song titled "Sparks" on SiriusXMU, further stating that it would serve as the lead single from Depression Cherry. The song was subsequently released on July 1, 2015, alongside its accompanying visualizer, which was released on YouTube, and was also performed on SiriusXMU. On July 9, 2015, Depression Cherry was leaked on the internet through a data breach on music site Spin. On August 6, 2015, "PPP" and "Beyond Love" were previewed in an interview on WBUR-FM's Here and Now, being the second and third singles from Depression Cherry. The album's three supporting singles were later published through the band's website, though one could be accessed through the "Single Finder" feature. On August 19, nine days before the album's release, NPR Music made a stream of the album available online. The album debuted at number eight on the Billboard 200, with 27,000 copies sold in its first week.

On September 28, 2015, Spin reported that Beach House had performed a new song called "Helicopter Dream (I'm Awake)" on Flaming Lips frontman Wayne Coyne's podcast, The Fearless Freakcast. Other publications also reported on the purported new track, including Consequence of Sound, Fact, and Stereogum. Reaction to the track was largely favorable, with Spin calling it a "fuzzy space-odyssey" and Consequence of Sound describing it as "a reverb-soaked number." However, according to the band's representatives, it was a fake song, and their representatives stated in an e-mail sent to Spin, "It is not a new song. Not even their voices on that podcast. Sorry!" An article on Gawker used the hoax as an example of "how easy it is to fool a blogger". The fake song and podcast hoax was named by Vice's Noisey as one of "The Best Trolls of 2015." On October 7, 2015, less than two months following the release of Depression Cherry, the band announced their sixth studio album, Thank Your Lucky Stars, on their Twitter account, adding that it would be released on October 16, that same year. Though the album was recorded alongside Depression Cherry, the band felt that the records should be seen as distinct unconnected works, also stating that it is "not a companion to Depression Cherry, or a surprise, or b-sides." The album debuted at number 39 on the Billboard 200 and at number four on the Top Rock Albums chart, with 10,000 copies sold in its first week.

On January 31, 2017, the band announced a North American tour and revealed that they were putting together a collection of B-sides and rare cuts. The idea for a B-sides record came when the band realized how many non-album songs had been made over the years, and how hard it was to find and hear many of them. This compilation contains every song the band has ever made that does not exist on one of their records. On May 17, 2017, the band released "Chariot" as the lead single for the compilation album, which was revealed as B-Sides and Rarities. The song is one of the two on the album which were previously unreleased, with "Baseball Diamond" being the other song. An accompanying music video for the track was released on June 14, 2017. Self-directed by the band, the video features stock footage of former President John F. Kennedy and First Lady Jacqueline Kennedy, of which a press release stated that it is a "rumination on the creation, cultivation, and confusion of narratives in media." B-Sides and Rarities was released on June 30, 2017, and features 14 tracks which were separately recorded within a ten-year period, from 2005 to 2015, set in a non-chronological order. 12 of the tracks were previously released. In a promotional bio, the band wrote, "[B-Sides and Rarities] felt like a good step for us. It helped us clean the creative closet, put the past to bed, and start anew."

=== 2018–2019: 7 ===
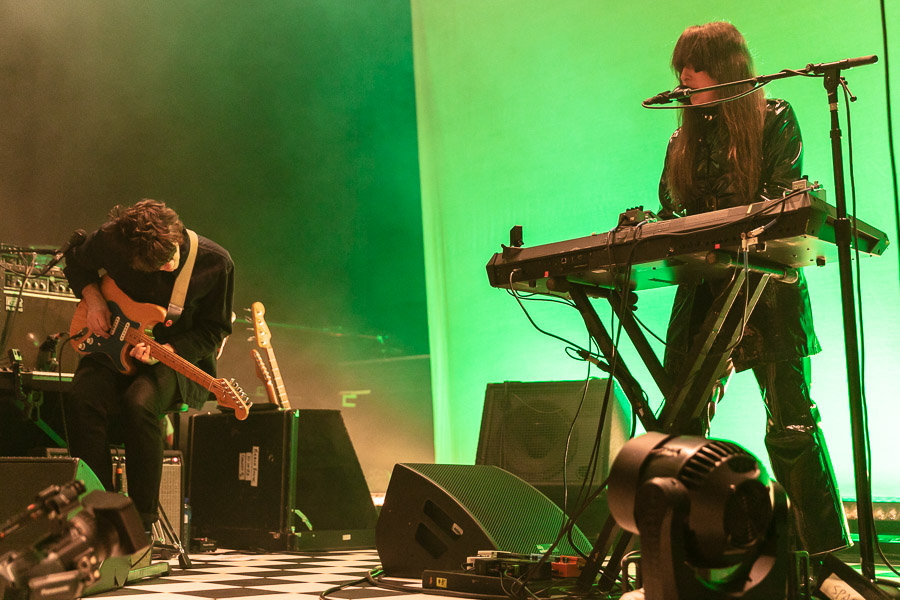
Beach House performing at Rockefeller Music Hall in Oslo in 2018

On February 15, 2018, after a half-year break, the band released a new song, "Lemon Glow," and announced it as the lead single from their then-upcoming album which they said would be released "later this spring." Accompanied with an Instagram post captioned, "Wishing everyone out there love tonight," as well as a "groovy checkered" visualizer, the band stated the it would serve as the lead single from their then-upcoming and untitled seventh studio album. The song incorporated electronic elements, featuring the use of drum machines and synthesizers. On March 7, 2018, the band officially announced their seventh album, titled 7, unveiling its album cover, track list and accompanying world tour dates in addition. On the same day, they released the album's second single, "Dive," along with a visualizer and the availability of a pre-order of the album. On April 2, they released "Dark Spring" as the album's third single, alongside a music video directed by Zia Anger. On May 2, 2018, "Black Car" was released as the fourth single from the album, along with its accompanying visualizer.

In a promotional interview days leading up to the album, the band stated that they wanted to reassess their old methods, where they often limited their writing to structures and arrangements that they were able to perform live, and eventually decided to follow what came naturally, adding that they let their creative spirits, instead of instrumentation, to determine the album's feeling. On May 11, 2018, Beach House released their seventh studio album 7, along with an accompanying animated album visualizer, entirely directed by San Charoenchai, that was uploaded to the band's YouTube channel, with each song being accompanied by psychedelic black-and-white visuals. The album also follows their [B-Sides and Rarities compilation album released in 2017, which served as a proverbial "cleaning out the closet" to pave the way for a new creative process. Scally stated that this release felt "really kinetic" and felt excitement by "the kind of bubbling, chaotic, discordant energy field." The album also sees the group's departure from working with longtime producer Chris Coady, now featuring co-production by English record producer Pete "Sonic Boom" Kember; his work with Spacemen 3 and Spectrum impressed the band to reach out and see if he might like to co-produce the album with them.

On May 15, the band performed "Drunk in LA" as musical guests on Jimmy Kimmel Live!. An accompanying music video for "Black Car" was directed by Legrand's brother, Alistair Legrand, and was released on June 18. A music video for "Drunk in LA", which was directed by Peter Kember, co-producer of 7, was released on September 11, 2018, with a Sonic Boom remix of "Black Car" being released on the same day. On October 23, 2018, the band released a limited edition 7-inch vinyl of "Lose Your Smile" from 7 as the A-side and a new track from the recording sessions of 7 titled "Alien" as the B-side. The vinyl was originally sold on the band's European tour in dates from September to October. In addition, a visualizer for "Alien" was uploaded on the same day, which was directed by Charoenchai, and was also released as a standalone single to digital download and streaming services. On the same day, they announced later Australian tour dates, which included shows between February and March 2019.

=== 2021–2023: "Space Song" virality and Once Twice Melody ===
In 2021, "Space Song", the third track from their fifth studio album Depression Cherry, became a sleeper hit when it attained virality on TikTok and later received a platinum certification by the Recording Industry Association of America (RIAA) in January 2022. Further, the song was featured in the Netflix-original television series Wednesday (2022), appearing in its third episode. After its appearance on the series, the song earned over four million streams in the United States, within the November 25–December 1, 2022, tracking week. With the support of the streams, the song debuted at number 20 on the US Hot Rock & Alternative Songs chart, marking their first appearance on the chart, later peaking at number 13 on the chart the following week.

In February 2021, in an interview with Rolling Stone, Alex Scally revealed that they were thinking of working on their eighth album, adding that they would "like to get there". In a September 2021 interview with 101.9 KINK FM, the band confirmed that they had been working on their eight album during the COVID-19 pandemic, adding that it would be released in 2022. In November 2021, the band announced their eighth studio album Once Twice Melody, which is their first double album. The album was released in four chapters throughout November 2021 and February 2022, with a slated release date of the entire album on February 18, 2022. The first chapter, Pink Funeral, was released on November 10, 2021, with the title track being released as its lead single on the same day. Its second chapter, New Romance, was released on December 8, 2021.

The third chapter for Once Twice Melody, Masquerade, was released on January 19, 2022. "Hurts to Love" was released on February 14, 2022, to coincide with Valentine's Day, as the album's second single, further denoting its inclusion on its fourth chapter, Modern Love Stories, which officially marked the official release of the entire album, on February 18, 2022. Once Twice Melody debuted atop the US Billboard Top Album Sales chart, with 20,300 copies sold in its first week; in addition it debuted atop the US Top Alternative Albums, Top Rock Albums and Top Vinyl Albums charts. It also debuted at number 12 on the US Billboard 200 album chart with 24,000 album-equivalent units, adding their fourth top-20 entry on the chart.

On February 26, 2022, American rapper Kanye West published a series of photos of him with the band in a studio, leading to speculation of a collaboration. "Superstar" was later sent to US radio on April 4, 2022, as the third single from Once Twice Melody, while the title track peaked at number 15 on the US Adult Alternative Airplay chart. The band performed "Superstar" on The Late Show with Stephen Colbert on May 20, 2022. To support the album, the band embarked on the Once Twice Melody tour, which began on February 18, 2022, in Pittsburgh and ended on July 24, 2022, in Washington, D.C.. The liner notes of Once Twice Melody also list James Barone as a full band member for the first time. Their Spotify bio was also updated to reflect this lineup change.

On February 16, 2023, the band announced their EP Become, containing five previously unreleased songs from the Once Twice Melody sessions. The project was released on April 22, 2023, as a Record Store Day exclusive before being made available for streaming on April 28, 2023. On August 19, 2023, the band curated and introduced a favorite film, Lynne Ramsay's Morvern Callar, at the inaugural edition of Baltimore's New/Next Film Festival. On December 8, Beach House announced that they perform as a duo (Legrand and Scally) at Johnny Brenda's in Philadelphia on December 11, adding that they would only specifically perform "songs without any live drums". They were also one of the supporting acts for the sixth night of Yo La Tengo's Hanukkah Tour (2023), on December 12, where Legrand also sang on a live cover of the Velvet Underground's "Pale Blue Eyes".

=== 2024–present: Hiatus, short tour and "April Suzanne" cover ===
Beach House performing at the We Love Green festival in Paris on June 8, 2025

In December 2024, Beach House announced spring tour dates, including performances at Primavera Sound and Kilby Block Party for 2025. In mid-2025, after concluding these dates, the band confirmed a small hiatus on their fan subreddit, stating that there would be no further tour dates or a new album that year, although stated that they "hope" to tour and release an album in 2026, "though only time will tell." They additionally stated that this short tour "was a test of sorts, to get a feel for the road again after such a long break," and to understand how they will plan tour dates in the future.

In June 2026, Beach House was announced as one of the supporting acts, along with TV on the Radio and Fcukers, for the Strokes' concert at Flushing Meadows–Corona Park in New York City on October 2, with some warm up dates announced in Nashville, Knoxville, in Pittsburgh. On September 16, Beach House released a cover of singer-songwriter Robert Lester Folsom's "April Suzanne", as a contribution and one of the two covers from Folsom's 50th-anniversary reissue of his album, Music and Dreams (1976). The cover was released alongside a remastered version of the original folk rock song.

== Other projects ==
=== Gene Clark No Other Band ===
When [Gene Clark's] No Other was released in September of 1974, it received a lot of bad reviews, most criticising its studio excess. A lot of people of its generation don't really know the record. Throughout the years since, many have dug the record up and fallen in love with it. We are certainly two of those people and we hope that the tour we are organising to play the record live will spread awareness of the album even more.

— Beach House, regarding the Gene Clark No Other Band

In December 2013, Beach House announced that they had put together a supergroup, referred to as the Gene Clark No Other Band, for a four-concert tour in January 2014, which took place in Baltimore, Philadelphia, New York City and Washington, D.C., where they covered American singer-songwriter Gene Clark's album No Other (1974) in its entirety to bring it to a new audience. The supergroup's member lineup consisted of fellow Baltimore musicians including members of Lower Dens, Wye Oak, Celebration, Fleet Foxes, Grizzly Bear and The Walkmen, along with Iain Matthews of Fairport Convention and Plainsong. Each performance also included a presentation of a specially edited version of the documentary The Byrd Who Flew Alone: The Triumphs and Tragedy of Gene Clark. In March 2014, it was announced that they were also the headliners for the 2014 End of the Road Festival. A 50-minute video of the supergroup's entire January 26 performance at the Music Hall of Williamsburg in New York was released by Pitchfork in April 2014, with Legrand as part of the vocal chorus and Scally on bass. Bill Pearis of BrooklynVegan called the performance a "knockout show."

=== Scoring ===
In 2013, Beach House provided scoring for the 13-minute short film This Must Be the Only Fantasy, which was created by Todd Cole and produced by the Creators Project. Beach House scored four trailers that ran before each film screening at the 2020 Sundance Film Festival. In 2021, Beach House collaborated with Meow Wolf, an immersive arts production company based in Santa Fe, NM, to create soundscapes for Meow Wolf's new permanent installation in Las Vegas called Omega Mart. The band composed about 30 minutes of music for three rooms within the installation, those being "Upload Ghost," a sculpture designed by Stephen Hendee, "Goblin Computer," and "Marin and Rose's Dwelling." For the latter, they also provided a soundtrack for an accompanying short film called Marin's Dreams. In March 2022, it was announced that Beach House would provide the score to Sofia Alvarez's Netflix film Along for the Ride.

== Musical style ==
=== Genres and structures ===
Beach House is often labeled as a dream pop band, though the band have usually dismissed being labeled as such, stating that they "feel very much that [they] don't have to be put into a category." The group's success in the late 2000s solidified the popularity of the dream pop subgenre with millennial listeners. They have also been described as indie rock and shoegaze. Guitarist Alex Scally plays a Fender Stratocaster guitar, with a Boss RV-5 Digital Reverb pedal. Legrand's vocals within the duo's self-titled album had been compared to those of Nico and Hope Sandoval. That album, along with Devotion and Teen Dream, have also been described as indie pop and lo-fi, the latter album incorporating live drums. Bloom also sees a high usage in live drums and has a darker sound than Teen Dream, as well as a lean-away from their lo-fi style into "high-grade pop". The band also wanted the album to have a "similar vision" to albums such as The Beach Boys' Pet Sounds (1966), The Cure's Disintegration (1989) and Depeche Mode's Violator (1990).

The band also degraded their live drums usage within their fifth and sixth studio albums, Depression Cherry and Thank Your Lucky Stars, both released in 2015, returning to a simpler style of dream pop and relying more on programmed drum rhythms, while also adding shoegaze influences onto a few tracks, including "Sparks" and "One Thing" on their respective albums. They later began increasingly incorporating electronic textures on their songs. The material within their seventh studio album 7 (2018) being described by music publications as dream pop, with shoegaze and psychedelic pop influences. Their eighth studio album and first double-album release Once Twice Melody was described by critics to feature other genre influences such as neo-psychedelia and chamber pop, with its separate tracks found within its four chapters being described in other genres such as shoegaze and synth-pop. The album was solely produced by the band, a first for them, and features live string arrangements, which were handled by David Campbell. Throughout the album, there are also tracks that omit live drums, electronic songs without guitar, and "wandering and repetitive melodies", as described by the band.

=== Influences ===
Some music outlets have also compared Legrand's vocals to 1980s psychedelic rock vocalist Kendra Smith of the band Opal. The group's influences include the Zombies, Brian Wilson, Neil Young, Big Star, and Chris Bell. In 2021, Beach House named My Bloody Valentine's m b v (2013) as their favorite album in the last 25 years, stating that it was "worth the long wait after Loveless". Beach House re-recorded British folk trio Tony, Caro and John's song, "Snowdon Song," for their debut studio album, renaming it to "Lovelier Girl" and modifying its original arrangements. The song was released on the band's self-titled album with no given attribution to the trio. Initially, Tony Dore of Tony, Caro and John stated, "I haven't seen much yet in terms of royalties or acknowledgement of authorship". Several months later, however, Dore disclosed that discussions had taken place to apply proper attribution on re-releases of the self-titled album.

Legrand has described creating new music and releasing albums as a necessity for the band, saying, "When we decide that a record is finished, I think it's really about coming to terms with saying 'OK, I think we've done everything that we could do, and now it's time to let these things go.' Because if we hold onto them, we might destroy them or they might never come out. There are all different types of artists and I think that some people like to hold onto things and they get very perfectionistic. But perfectionism is kind of a synonym for destruction. It can really be a deterrent for one's evolution. Alex and I have always felt that putting records out is very necessary. It's a gut feeling we have."

=== Legacy ===
Beach House's music has been sampled by prominent hip-hop and R&B artists. In 2011, The Weeknd sampled "Master of None" and "Gila" in his songs "The Party & the After Party" and "Loft Music," respectively. Kendrick Lamar sampled "Silver Soul" for his hit "Money Trees." The rap group G-Side sampled "10 Mile Stereo" in their song "How Far."

Beach House has also inspired songs and musicians. Pop duo The Chainsmokers wrote "Beach House" as an ode to listening to Beach House. Wayne Coyne of the Flaming Lips listed Beach House's album Bloom as one of the ten records that changed his life.

== Live performances ==
In 2007, while on tour in support of their self-titled debut studio album, Scally expressed their enjoyment performing live, but found it more challenging as they felt it was difficult to perform the same exact songs each night, as well as driving all day and motivating themselves to feel any excitement. The band has toured extensively worldwide. Of touring, Legrand stated: "[W]e love touring. That's when you get to get into a rhythm, playing every night. It can be really fun. And I think you learn where you want to go with your music."

Beach House is famous for its visual-heavy live shows that elevate their sound to a new level. Scally believes that playing live music is the best way to connect with fans. The band's innovation in tour décor began with lightboxes with disco balls in them that Scally and Legrand made for their first tour.

In March 2009, the band was featured at the SXSW festival in Austin, Texas. In April 2010, the band performed at the Coachella Festival in Indio, California. In June 2010, the band surmounted "technical difficulties due to too much MDMA" while playing a set on The Park Stage at Glastonbury. In August 2010, the band joined Vampire Weekend on tour as one of their two opening acts, the other being the Dum Dum Girls. In October 2010, Beach House played at the Austin City Limits Music Festival. On December 20, 2010, the band performed on Conan.

The band was chosen by Animal Collective to perform at the All Tomorrow's Parties festival they curated in May 2011, and also by Portishead to perform at the ATP I'll Be Your Mirror festival that they curated in July 2011 at London's Alexandra Palace. On May 29, 2011, the band played at the Sasquatch! Music Festival. On July 31, 2011, the band played at the Fuji Rock music festival in Niigata, Japan. On October 16, 2011, the band played at the Treasure Island Music Festival. On May 18, 2012, they appeared on the Late Show with David Letterman and on Sunday, July 15, 2012, they performed the closing set on the Red Stage during the Pitchfork Music Festival. In May 2012, the band appeared on Later... with Jools Holland playing "Myth" and "Lazuli" from their 2012 album, Bloom. On July 26, 2012, they performed the Bloom cuts "Wild" and "Wishes" on Late Night with Jimmy Fallon.

On October 17, 2015, the band performed "One Thing" from their album Thank Your Lucky Stars (which debuted the same night) on The Late Show with Stephen Colbert. Beach House performed at Coachella 2016 as well as Pickathon 2016 outside of Portland, Oregon and FYF Fest 2016 in Los Angeles, California. On July 15, 2016, the band headlined the Pitchfork Music Festival in Chicago, Illinois. On August 13 the band played at the Eaux Claires music festival in Eau Claire, Wisconsin. In a 2016 interview, Beach House stated that they prefer performing at smaller venues rather than arenas, which were never part of "Beach House destiny".

"I believe that our show now with 7 material, visually and musically, is the best it's ever been. It evolved over a long period of time and it's a vision now. At first, it was just an idea, but now it's an experience…. We want to make people leave themselves. Any good artistic experience is like that," adds Scally. In March 2018, the band announced an extensive tour itinerary that started at the end of April in the States and took them through the fall to Europe. In August 2019, Beach House added new tour dates in the US, including stops in Burlington and Cleveland, as well as Grand Rapids and Milwaukee, appearing at Osheaga festival in Montreal, Psycho Fest in Las Vegas, and Bellwether Music Festival in Waynesville, OH.

== Band members ==
Beach House

- Victoria Legrand – lead vocals, keyboards, guitar, bass guitar
- Alex Scally – guitar, bass pedals, bass guitar, keyboards, backing vocals, drum machine programming
- James Barone – drums, percussion, bass guitar (2022–present, touring musician 2016–2022)

Former touring musicians

- Jason Robert Quever – drums, percussion (2008)
- Daniel Franz – drums, percussion (2008–2013)
- Chris Bear – drums, percussion (2014 Northern Exposure tour)
- Skyler Skjelset – bass guitar, keyboards, backing vocals (2015–2016)
- Graham Hill – drums, percussion, backing vocals
- David Bergander – drums, percussion

== Discography ==
Studio albums

- Beach House (2006)
- Devotion (2008)
- Teen Dream (2010)
- Bloom (2012)
- Depression Cherry (2015)
- Thank Your Lucky Stars (2015)
- 7 (2018)
- Once Twice Melody (2022)

== Awards and nominations ==
Award	Year	Category	Nominated work	Result	Ref.
Libera Awards	2013	Record of the Year	Bloom	Nominated	
Libera Awards	2016	Record of the Year	Depression Cherry	Nominated	
Sweden GAFFA Awards	2019	Best Foreign Album	7	Nominated	

== Works cited ==
- Newmark, Mike (April 13, 2007). "Victoria Legrand '03 to perform with Beach House" (PDF). The Miscellany News. Vol. 80, no. 19. p. 14. Archived from the original on April 30, 2026.
- Florino, Rick (March 3, 2008). "Interview: Victoria Legrand of Beach House". Artistdirect. Archived from the original on May 18, 2010.
- Beach House. Miradas 2 (in Spanish). July 14, 2012. Archived from the original on March 9, 2023 – via RTVE.
- Rose, Charlie (March 24, 2022). Beach House. Charlie Rose.
- Beach House. Broken Record Podcast. March 8, 2022.
