= List of rockabilly musicians =

This is a list of musicians who have played rockabilly. For a list of psychobilly musicians, see list of psychobilly bands.

== 0–9 ==
- The 5.6.7.8's

== A ==
- Ace Andres
- Hasil Adkins
- Ace and the Ragers
- Amazing Royal Crowns

== B ==
- Smokey Joe Baugh
- Tommy Blake
- Eddie Bond
- Bonnie Lou
- Jimmy Bowen
- BR549
- Sonny Burgess
- Johnny Burnette
- The Blasters
- Rocky Burnette
- The Baseballs
- Drake Bell
- Boz Boorer
- Billy Burnette

== C ==
- Ray Campi
- Johnny Carroll
- Johnny Cash
- Crazy Cavan and the Rhythm Rockers
- Sanford Clark
- Joe Clay
- Eddie Cochran
- The Collins Kids
- Commander Cody and His Lost Planet Airmen
- Creedence Clearwater Revival
- Crash Craddock
- Mac Curtis
- Sonny Curtis
- The Chop Tops
- Cigar Store Indians

== D ==
- Ronnie Dawson
- Jesse Dayton
- Mike Deasy
- Deke Dickerson
- Al Downing

== E ==
- Jack Earls
- Duane Eddy
- Dave Edmunds
- The Everly Brothers

== F ==
- Werly Fairburn
- Charlie Feathers
- Narvel Felts
- The Firebirds
- Sonny Fisher
- Eddie Fontaine
- The Four Aces
- Billy Fury
- Flat Duo Jets
- Tav Falco
- Rosie Flores

== G ==
- Ralph Gean
- Glen Glenn
- Danny Gatton
- The Go Getters
- Robert Gordon
- Grandpa Candys

== H ==
- Buddy Harman
- Bill Haley
- Hardrock Gunter
- Dale Hawkins
- Ronnie Hawkins
- Mickey Hawks
- Dave Hawley
- Roy Head
- Eric Heatherly
- Darrel Higham
- Buddy Holly
- The Honeydrippers
- Johnny Horton
- The Head Cat
- Heavy Trash
- George Hamilton IV

== I ==
- James Intveld
- Chris Isaak

== J ==
- Roddy Jackson
- Wanda Jackson
- Jackslacks
- Jason & the Scorchers
- The Jets
- Jimmy and the Mustangs
- Juke Joint Gamblers

== K ==
- Jerry King
- The Kings of Nuthin'
- Buddy Knox

== L ==
- Sleepy LaBeef
- Gene Lamarr
- Langi Seli og Skuggarnir
- Brenda Lee
- Freddie 'Fingers' Lee
- Alis Lesley
- Jerry Lee Lewis
- Margaret Lewis
- Jim Lowe
- Nick Lowe
- Lyle Lovett
- Bob Luman
- The Lucky Bullets
- Legendary Shack Shakers
- Legendary Stardust Cowboy
- The Living End
- Lone Justice

== M ==
- Janis Martin
- Raul Malo
- Matchbox
- Imelda May
- JD McPherson
- Lonnie Mack
- Carl Mann
- Grady Martin
- Clinton Miller
- Bob Moore
- Sparkle Moore
- Morrissey (1991–1992)
- Roy Moss
- Mud
- Keith O'Conner Murphy

== N ==
- Ricky Nelson
- Steve Nardella
- Mojo Nixon

== O ==
- Roy Orbison
- Buck Owens
- PSI

== P ==
- Carl Perkins
- Earl Peterson
- Slim Jim Phantom
- Joe Poovey
- Johnny Powers
- Elvis Presley
- The Phenomenauts
- The Polecats

== R ==
- Marvin Rainwater
- Jerry Reed
- Jody Reynolds
- Cliff Richard
- Charlie Rich
- Billy Lee Riley
- Marty Robbins
- Rattled Roosters
- The Reverend Horton Heat
- Lee Rocker
- The RockTigers
- Skid Roper
- Dexter Romweber
- The Razorbacks
- Red Hot and Blue
- The Rockats
- Rockpile
- Royal Teens
- Jane Rose
- Restless

== S ==
- Jack Scott
- Ronnie Self
- Brian Setzer
- Del Shannon
- Jumpin' Gene Simmons
- Ray Smith
- Warren Smith
- Djordje Stijepovic
- Sonny and his Wild Cows
- Bobby Sowell
- Gene Summers
- Dan Sartain
- Southern Culture on the Skids
- Shakin Stevens
- Stray Cats
- Billy Swan

== T ==
- Tom Tall
- Vernon Taylor
- Vince Taylor
- The Thirsty Crows
- Hayden Thompson
- Tommy & The Tom Toms aka The Bill Smith Combo
- Conway Twitty
- Two Tons of Steel

== V ==
- Gene Vincent
- Vazelina Bilopphøggers
- Volbeat

== W ==
- Marty Wilde
- Hank Williams Jr.
- Link Wray

== Y ==
- The Young Werewolves
- Malcolm Yelvington
- Neil Young and the Shocking Pinks

== Z ==
- Eddie Zack
