= The Kings of Nuthin' discography =

Discography of punk rock and rockabilly band The Kings of Nuthin'

The Kings of Nuthin' albums discography
- Studio albums: 3
- EPs: 1
- Singles: 2
- Other appearances: 28

The discography of Boston-based punk rock and rockabilly band The Kings of Nuthin' consists of three albums, one extended play, two singles and 28 compilation appearances

The Kings of Nuthin' started their music career in 1999. The same line-up performed already in 1998 under the name The Boston Blackouts and the core group Torr Skoog (upright bass), Liam Crill (drums) and Chris “Necro” Wilkinson (washboard) began meeting in 1996 and performed with a changing line-up including other musicians under the name The Saturday Night Specials. There are no known recordings of both former bands.

Their first EP Get Busy Livin' or Get Busy Dyin' (2000) was released through the lesser known label Reckloose Records and half a year later through Crazy Love Records. Their first full-length album Fight Songs for Fuck-Ups (2002) was released through Disaster Records. The album Punk Rock Rhythm & Blues (2005) was first released on People Like You for the European market and appeared on the American market under the name Over the Counter Culture (2006) on Sailor's Grave Records. This label also released their last album Old Habits Die Hard (2010).

== Albums ==
Title	Album Details
Fight Songs for Fuck-Ups	Released: September 17, 2002; Label: Disaster Records
Over the Counter Culture	Released: April 4, 2006; Label: Sailor's Grave Records
Old Habits Die Hard	Released: May 11, 2010; Label: Sailor's Grave Records

== EPs ==
Title	Album Details
Get Busy Livin' or Get Busy Dyin'	Released: October 28, 2000; Label: Reckloose Records; Format: 12-inch, digital download, streaming

== Singles ==
Title	Single Details	Album
Shit out of Luck	Released: 2001; Label: Haunted Town Records; Format: 7-inch, digital download, streaming	Fight Songs for Fuck-Ups
The Kings of Nuthin' / The Briggs	Released: March 2, 2004; Label: Disaster Records; Format: 7-inch, digital download, streaming	Non-album single

== Other appearances ==
Year	Song(s)	Album	Label
2002	"Shit out of Luck	Ox-Compilation #48 - Hell	Ox Fanzine – oxcd 35
2002	"Drive All Night"	Old Skars & Upstarts 2002	Disaster Records – DSR 9014-2
2003	"Livin' or Dyin'"	Kicked Outta Purgatory: Psychobilly for Sinners!	Hairball 8 – HB8-007, Psychobilly US – PSYCHO US-001
2003	"Where Do We Go?"	L.A. Shakedown	Acetate Records – ATE 7013
2003	"Fight Song for Fuck-Ups"	From the Bottom of the Barrel Volume II	Superhero Records – SHR 005
2003	"Get Busy Livin' or Get Busy Dyin'"	Der weltbeste Moloko Plus Sampler #25	Moloko Plus Fanzine – none
2004	"Let It Burn"	Welcome to Circus Punk-a-Billy	Wolverine Records – WRR 111
2004	"Cry, Cry, Cry"	Dear Johnny...A Tribute to Cash	Hairball 8 – HB8-008
2005	"For You"	Plastic Bomb #53	Plastic Bomb Records – MAG # 53
2005	"Wild in the Streets" [Rare Track]	Old Skars and Upstarts 505	Disaster Records – 9039-2
2005	"For You"	Up Sampler 25	Up Magazine – UPCD025
2005	"Women and Cadillacs"	Dynamite! CD #01 (Issue 46)	Dynamite (The World of Rock'n'Roll) – 1
2005	"For You"	Ox-Compilation #63 - Dance, Dance, Dance	Ox Fanzine – OXCD 50
2006	"Over the Counter Culture"	Where the Bad Boys Rock 3	"I Used to Fuck People Like You" Records – Prison 110-2PS
2006	"Banned from the Pubs"	Psychomania No.1	Halb 7 Records – PROMO HALB 39-2
2006	"Banned from the Bars"	Bound for the Bar Vol. 1	"I Used to Fuck People Like You in Prison" Records – LUCKY 01
2006	"If I Were You"	Loud Fast Rules! Volume #3	Loud Fast Rules – none
2007	"If I Were You"	The Kamikaze Broadcast Volume 2	No Front Teeth Records – NFTR0030
2007	"Banned from the Pubs"	Rock'n'Roll Mobsters - True Music for the Underdogs of Today	Suburban Records – BURBCD 052
2008	"Shit out of Luck"	Haunted Town Records Sampler #1	Haunted Town Records –#169
2008	"Shitsville USA"	Where the Bad Boys Rock 4	"I Used to Fuck People Like You in Prison" Records – Prison168-2
2008	"Only Time"	Punk N Roll A Licious Volume 3	Punk'n Drunk Recordings – GCR 55000-2
2008	"For You"	King Calavera - St Pauli O Muerte - Songs from the Home of Punk'N'Roll	"I Used to Fuck People Like You in Prison" Records – PRISON KCV 08-2-P
2010	"New Scenery"	Dynamite! CD #20 (Issue 65 04/2010)	Dynamite (The World of Rock'n'Roll) – 20
2010	"For You"	Fight Songs for Fuck-Ups	"I Used to Fuck People Like You in Prison" Records – 4682092
2010	"Dead Set Against"	Ox-Compilation #90	Ox Fanzine – oxcd 77
2010	"Old Habits"	It's Like Bringing a Fork to a Gunfight	ThePunkSite.com – none
2010	"Black and Blue", "Sick and Tired"	New Release Highlights (Thrilling Albums out on Century Media Records in April/Early May 2010)	Century Media – 9980212P, Inside Out Music – 9980212P, "I Used To Fuck People Like You In Prison" Records – 9980212P
2011	"For You (Live)" [Rare Track]	Dirty Home of Riot Rock 'n' Roll	Century Media / EMI / People Like You Records – 468237
