= List of The Kings of Nuthin' concert tours =

This is the tour history of the American punk rock and rhythm & blues band The Kings of Nuthin'. Formed in 1999, the band have toured Europe extensively between 2003 and 2007.

== 2000s tours ==
=== 2002 ===
- 2002 Winter East Coast Suck It Tour (January–February 2002; East Coast including Florida)
- "Kicked out of Purgatory" California Tour (June 27–July 12, 2002; primarily California tour with one show each in Nevada, Arizona & Wisconsin) (with Demented Are Go in CA & NV and an appearance at the Oneida Rockabilly Festival in Green Bay, WI, which featured some of the most recognizable rockabilly representatives, such as The Comets, Wanda Jackson and The Crickets) (Note: At the Green Bay Wisconsin Rockabilly Festival performed also Young Jessie, who both Zack Brines and Liam Crill cited as an influential artist for them.)

=== 2003 ===
- European Tour (May 8–June 9, 2003; 20 shows in Germany, (Note: The future bassist Thomas Lorioux met the Kings of Nuthin' at a concert in Berlin on June 5, 2003 for the first time.) 3 shows in Austria and 1 show each in Poland, Belgium and Netherlands) (performance at the "Tales of the Streets Festival" in Essen, Germany, with Cockney Rejects and the Meteors)
- "Just get in the fucking bus already" Europe Tour (December 25, 2003 – January 11, 2004; 12 shows in Germany, 5 shows in Switzerland and 2 shows in Austria) (~~Italy leg of the tour was canceled~~)

=== 2004 ===
- "East Coast Assault" Midwest Tour (February 2–8, 2004; 2 shows each in NY & OH, 1 show each in Mi & IL) (shows in Buffalo, NY (2nd), Cincinnati, OH (3rd) and Albany, NY (8th) with Dropkick Murphy's and the Unseen)
- "Bring your own fucking Sax" East Coast Tour (April 14–30, 2004; 4 shows in FL, 2 shows each in GA, NC & NY, 1 show each in VA, PA, CT, MA) (Valentine's show in Albany, NY on April 30, with Murphy's Law and the Ducky Boys)
- ~~"Where did you go, where did you stay" Europe Tour (June 18–July 17, 2004; 12 shows in Germany, 2 shows each in Austria and Poland, 1 show each in Switzerland, Netherlands and Spain)~~ (entire European tour was canceled) (Note: "The European Tour has been officialy [sic] canceled due to circumstances beyond our control.")
- "Out of Tune, Out of Luck, Drunk as ..." U.S. Tour (August 18–September 18, 2004; 5 shows in CA, 4 shows in NY, 3 shows in MO, 3 shows in IN, 2 shows in PA and 1 show each in MA, MI, IL, CO, UT, ID, WA, OR, AR, TX, OK, OH)

=== 2005 ===
- "MAN DOWN" Europe Tour (January 13–February 20, 2005; 18 shows in Germany, 4 shows in Austria, 3 shows in Italy, 2 shows in Great Britain, 1 show each in France, Belgium, Netherlands, Denmark, Sweden, Norway, Czech Republic and Switzerland) (Note: After the show in Bologna, Italy, on February 19, the guitarist and saxophonist were arrested in Venice. They were only released two weeks later after the end of the tour.)
- Old Skars & Upstarts Tour (September 1–18, 2005; 2 shows each in CA, OH & NY, 1 show each in OR, WA, ID, UT, NE, MN, IN, IL, MI, PA, NH, NJ, MA, ~~5 shows in TX, 3 shows each in FL & CA, 1 show each in MA, MD, NC, GA, MO, OK, AZ, NV,~~ the rest of the tour until October 18, had to be canceled) (Note: "Due to circumstances beyond our control we have had to cancel the rest of the Old Scars & Upstarts Tour. Weather down south, gas prices, last minute venue cancelations as well as tour discrepencies from the L.A. home-office has forced us to make this hard decision.") (skate punk rock tour organized by Duane Peters, including mini-festivals for Chicago, New York, Austin and Los Angeles)
- "Punk Rock Rhythm & Blues" Europe Tour (November 18–December 18, 2005; 13 shows in Germany, 3 shows each in Austria and Spain, 2 shows each in Belgium and Great Britain, 1 show each in Denmark, France, Netherlands and Poland) (tour promoted the eponymous album and started on the date of its planned release in Europe)

=== 2006 ===
- ~~Bad Boys for Life Tour (Europe) (April 6–28, 2006; 7 shows in Germany, 1 show each in Switzerland and Austria)~~ (planned bands The Kings of Nuthin' and U.S. Bombs were replaced with other bands)
- ~~"Over the Counter Culture" U.S. Tour (April–May 2006) (with U.S. Bombs and The Tossers supporting the release of Over The Counter Culture on April 4, 2006)~~ (entire tour was canceled)
- 5th European Tour (June 2–July 10, 2006; 17 shows in Germany, 2 shows each in Austria and France, 1 show each in Netherlands, Switzerland and Spain) (performance at the Calella Psychobilly Festival in Calella, Spain)

=== 2007 ===
- ~~Bad Boys for Life Tour (Europe) (April 6–21, 2007; 7 shows in Germany, 1 show each in Switzerland and Austria)~~ (entire tour was canceled)
- 6th European Tour (August 30–September 8, 2007; 6 shows in Germany, 1 show each in Belgium and Spain) (appearance at the Calella Psychobilly Festival in Calella, Spain)

== Notable concert performances ==
- September 17, 1999; The Milkyway in Boston, MA: Band's first gig under the name Kings-A-Nothin'. Two weeks later, they performed under one of their previous names (The Boston Bootleggers), and another three weeks later, on October 21, as Kings of Nuthin' (formerly Boston Blackouts).
- December 8, 2000; Axis (House of Blues) in Boston, MA: They were invited by the Mighty Mighty Bosstones to their 7th Hometown Throwdown music festival.
- March 2, 2001; Lupo's Heartbreak Hotel & The Met Cafe in Providence, RI: The band was banned from this venue due to misbehavior and their dangerous pyrotechnic show. (Note: "April 18: CANCELLED | @the Green Room, Providence RI | the Green Room has been closed until further notice for fire code violations.")
- May 24, 2001, The Middle East in Cambridge, MA: They were finalists at the WBCN Rock & Roll Rumble, a more than three decades old "battle of the bands".
- November 6, 2001, The Middle East in Cambridge, MA: The Kings of Nuthin' played with 1950s rockabilly musician Joe Clay.
- July 12, 2002, Oneida Casino in Green Bay, WI: They performed at a festival that was promoted as the biggest rockabilly event ever, held with dozens of famous stars of the past decades.
- November 23, 2003, CBGB in New York City, NY: They performed at the Zombilly Weekender (booked by Mike Decay) at the famous CBGB as support act for the Monsters.
- September 12, 2005, Skatopia in Rutland, OH: They performed at the infamous skatepark.
- June 30, 2006, Flugplatz Roitzschjora in Löbnitz, Germany: They played at the Full Force alongside well-known acts such as Motörhead, Opeth, Arch Enemy and In Flames.
- September 8, 2007, Calella Psychobilly Festival in Calella, Spain: Acoustic jam with the saxophonist of Sonny Burgess as an intro to their own concert, in which they dedicated several songs to him and which was the last one we heard from.
