= The Kings of Nuthin' =

American punk rock band (1999–2013)

- The Kings of Nuthin' live in Colmar (France) (2005-11-27) — left to right: Thomas Lorioux, Necro, Torr Skoog, Trafton Waldrop, Hayden Cummings

Background information
- Origin: Boston, Massachusetts, US
- Genres: Punkabilly; psychobilly; street punk; punk rock; rock'n'roll; neo-rockabilly; rhythm and blues
- Works: Discography
- Years active: 1996-2013
- Labels: Reckloose Records; Crazy Love Records; Disaster Records; People Like You Records; Sailor's Grave Records
- Spinoffs: Heathen Apostles; Flying Vipers; Pressure Cooker
- Spinoff of: The Boston Blackouts
- Past members: Torr Skoog; Zack Brines; Liam Crill; Chris Wilkinson; Justin Hubbard; Spike Katz; Danny Edge; Tommy Bellevue; Slick; Hayden Cummings; Thomas Lorioux; Trafton Waldrop
- Website: kingsofnuthin.com (Archived on May 31, 2008)

The Kings of Nuthin' was a 7-9 piece American punk rock band from Boston, Massachusetts. Founded in the late 1990s, they gained international attention in the early 2000s, especially in Europe, for their unusual combination of street punk, rock'n'roll and swing as well as their energetic live performances with piano, double bass, washboard and horns. After releasing four albums, they disbanded following the death of their singer in 2013.

== History ==
=== The Saturday Night Specials (1996–1998) ===
The founding members of the Kings of Nuthin' were the core group Torr Skoog (upright bass), Liam Crill (drums) and Chris "Necro" Wilkinson (washboard). Originally a three piece band with a changing line-up of punks, bike messengers and squatters, they began meeting in 1996 in a warehouse filled with skate ramps in Jamaica Plain, Boston. From 1996 to 2001, the city experienced a small rockabilly revival and the band played this style with a slightly larger line-up, including a singer and up to two guitarists. They made their first live appearances under the name Saturday Night Specials.

=== The Boston Blackouts (1998–1999) ===
From 1998 to 1999, the band performed under different names (e.g. Boston Bootleggers but mainly Boston Blackouts) and the line-up changed several times: Slick initially played second guitar, and experienced bassist Spike Katz was persuaded by Torr Skoog, who then switched from bass to vocals. After the personnel change, they quickly made a name for themselves in rockabilly and psychobilly circles.

=== The Kings of Nuthin' (1999–2000): Demo Tape; EP Get Busy Livin' or Get Busy Dyin' ===
As they increasingly played outside Massachusetts, they changed their name to the Kings of Nuthin' in the summer of 1999, naming themselves after the jacket club Kings A' Nuthin' from Orlando, Florida, where Spike Katz was touring with the Racketeers and thought the name would fit the band perfectly. Subsequently, there were members who contributed to both groups, for example, the interlude in the song "Kings of Nuthin'" was spoken by a member of Kings A' Nuthin'. They recorded their first demo tape in 1999 at Boston's 7A West Studio with the following band members: Torr Skoog (vocals), Justin Hubbard (guitar), Zack Brines (keyboards), Spike Katz (upright bass), Danny Edge (saxophone), Liam Crill (drums) and Chris Wilkinson (washboard). Studio owner Caglianone described their early style as 50's roots rock with a punk twist.

In October 2000, they released their first EP Get Busy Livin' or Get Busy Dyin', signed to Reckloose Records. A Boston Phoenix review presents their style as urban jump blues "bolstered by some tough punk attitude" and compares Torr Skoog's vocals to those of a cartoonish Tom Waits. Punk Planet compares his voice to that of Dicky Barrett from the Mighty Mighty Bosstones, accompanied by a band whose sound is somewhere between the Stray Cats and the Brian Setzer Orchestra. The German punk zine Ox-Fanzine wrote that the Kings of Nuthin' offer hard, fast and dirty rock'n'roll in its purest form, which lies somewhere between Stray Cats and The Meteors, and clearly stands out from the broad mass of neo-swing and rockabilly bands. A second reviewer of the magazine describes the album as "an extremely swinging combination of punk rock from the street, psychobilly and casual, laid-back rhythm & blues".

After the death of saxophonist Danny Edge in November 2000, (Note: The movie director Elgin James said in an interview: "A friend of ours actually passed away, someone that was in the gang with me, my friend Danny Edge, who actually played in the band Kings of Nuthin', he passed away a couple of years ago so we decided to make a film in his memory and loosely based on him." The independent film, in which Elgin James was one of the main actors, was entitled "Do Us Part" and was shown at the Boston Film Festival in 2003.) the band added Tommy Bellevue (tenor saxophone) as a new member and again Slick (now on baritone saxophone).

The band was invited to the annual Hometown Throwdown music festival, hosted by the Mighty Mighty Bosstones and featuring local bands from the Boston area, and played at the Axis (now House of Blues) in Boston in December 2000.

=== The Kings of Nuthin' (2001–2004): Fight Songs for Fuck-ups ===
After the label of their first album went bankrupt in 2001, they tried unsuccessfully to get a deal with Hellcat Records by sending them the remains of a piano they had burned down the night before, along with the live footage of it as a demo and a recommendation from Roger Miret. Later that year, they performed together with Joe Clay in Boston and were finalists in the Rock & Roll Rumble. Sponsored by WBCN-FM, this "battle of the bands" began in 1979 in the Greater Boston area and became the longest running event of its kind in the United States.

At the second Heavy Rebel Weekender, they performed at one of the major independent car and rock events in the United States, celebrating the hot-rod/greaser lifestyle in Winston-Salem, NC, around the Fourth of July 2002. A week later, they performed at the Oneida Rockabilly Festival in Green Bay, WI, which has been called the biggest rockabilly event ever and featured some of the most recognizable rockabilly representatives of the past decades, such as The Comets, Wanda Jackson and The Crickets. In September 2002, their first studio album Fight Songs for Fuck-Ups was released on Disaster Records. The style of the album is described in an AllMusic review as follows: "The mid-20th century roots elements are supplied by the saxes, piano, washboard, and standup bass. The punk comes across in the manic fast tempos, fuzzy guitars, singer Torr's gruff half-or-more grunt-shouted vocals, the hardcore-like trade-offs between the lead singing and backup anthemic choruses, and abrasive lyrics."

In 2003, the band was recommended by the Dropkick Murphys, performed at the Zombilly Weekender at CBGB as support act for the Monsters and embarked on their first European tour, known for their out-of-control performances with burning instruments.

In February 2004, their songs "La Chupacabra", "Where do We Go?" and "Drive All Night" appeared on the soundtrack of the PC version of the video game Crazy Taxi 3. The following month, the band released a split with LA's The Briggs and four month later contributed the song "Cry, Cry, Cry" to the album Dear Johnny...A Tribute to Cash, to which the Austin Chronicle writes that it elevates Johnny Cash to the same punk level as the Ramones.

=== The Kings of Nuthin' (2005–2009): Over the Counter Culture & European tour ===
In December 2005, the album Punk Rock Rhythm & Blues was released on People Like You for the European market and appeared on the American market in April 2006 under the name Over the Counter Culture on Sailor's Grave Records. It has been described as a really fun and energetic mix of 50's rock & roll, swing and big band music channeled through vintage street punk influences and not lacking in serious songwriting. According to Plastic Bomb, they are breaking new ground and an Upstarter review even certified The Kings of Nuthin' as redefining an entire musical genre: "Much like their hometown brethren, The Mighty Mighty Bosstones, The Kings of Nuthin' have done for Rock and Roll what the aforementioned did for ska."

In April 2007, the entire joint "Bad Boys for Life Tour" with bands such as U.S. Bombs and the Other was canceled because the Kings of Nuthin' couldn't get a full band together, but they did manage to tour Europe in the fall of 2007. On the last day of that tour, they provided a great moment at a festival in Spain by entertaining the audience during a break due to technical problems with a spontaneous acoustic performance with the saxophonist from the previous act, Sonny Burgess.

=== The Kings of Nuthin' (2010–2013): Old Habits Die Hard & disbandal ===
The album Old Habits Die Hard was released in May 2010 on Sailor's Grave Records. Like the two previous albums, it was recorded at Outpost studio in Stoughton, MA (Dropkick Murphys, The Mighty Mighty Bosstones, The Ducky Boys, The Unseen, Blood for Blood), and well received by the press: "Like a fine wine aging its way to perfection", the band, which also includes "one of the tightest brass sections of Boston", "has never felt so cohesive". Their "50's rock & roll hybrid with punk" has been described as more complex than before, with its interesting tempo changes and time signatures. Old Habits Die Hard was actually recorded five years earlier, so the last time the band were heard was during their 2007 European tour. Zach Brines told Ox-Fanzine: "Whether the line-up of the Kings of Nuthin' is stable or not is something that becomes clear every time after a tour", "we take a break, then we all get together again and decide how to proceed with the band and individual members." In July 2010, Thomas Lorioux revealed to bassist Djordje Stijepovic in an interview that the Kings of Nuthin' had been on-hold for almost three years. Even after the release of their last album, the band no longer performed live, although a tour was planned for 2010 and their label announced a new album for that year. As nothing came of either, the end of the European tour in September 2007 can be seen as the unofficial break-up of the band.

In June 2013, the body of singer Torr Skoog was found by police and firefighters at Quechee Gorge in southern Vermont. The investigation concluded that it was a suicide, and the Kings of Nuthin' disbanded as a result.

Until April 2014, Torr Skoog was part of the exhibition "This Is Boston Not LAme", which referenced the seminal 1982 Boston punk compilation "This Is Boston, Not L.A." and featured "four generations of Boston punk rock" in photographs by Gail Rush, Tara Feely, Nicole Tammaro and Dave Tree.

== Artistry ==
=== Musical style and genres ===
The Kings of Nuthin' formed a sound that was both a tribute to the past and a break with musical conventions. They mixed mid-20th century roots music with the energy of punk rock and stood out from comparable bands thanks to the distinctive vocals of their frontman Torr Skoog. Their sound fused elements of Early R&B, swing, rockabilly, rock'n'roll and punk rock. This was sometimes referred to as rockabilly revival, psychobilly, punkabilly, punk'n'roll, rock-a-punky, punk/rockabilly crossover, swing punk or psycho-swing.
Their early recordings were based on urban jump blues, roots rock and 1950s rock'n'roll, played "wildly original", hard, fast and dirty with an aggressive punk attitude. They contained strong rockabilly and psychobilly influences.
On their first album Fight Songs for Fuck-Ups, they moved away stylistically from psychobilly in favor of rhythm and blues, which was described by Punknews as a "hyper-rockabilly style", by Ox-Fanzine as an "extremely swinging combination of punk rock from the street" and by PlasticBomb as a "crazy mix of rockabilly, swing'n'jive and rudimentary garage punk". Maximum Rocknroll continued to group them generally under the subgenre of street punk.
Their genre fusion matured with Over the Counter Culture, which was intended as a synthesis of their previous work while expressing their diverse influences. According to laut.de, the European title Punk Rock Rhythm & Blues provides a perfect description of their style.
On Old Habits Die Hard, the band remained true to their style, but showed increased compositional complexity with tempo changes, intricate time signatures and a strong horn section. Critics lauded this "50s rock'n'roll hybrid with punk" a cohesive evolution of their roots.

=== Influences ===
According to a podcast with saxophonist and early band member Slick, singer Torr Skoog was influenced by the Stray Cats and the Mighty Mighty Bosstones in the time leading up to the Kings of Nuthin' first recordings, while Slick himself was influenced by The Cramps and Link Wray. In an interview with The Noise magazine, the band was asked about their influences. Torr Skoog named Tom Waits and Slapshot and Liam Crill named The Kids of Widney High and Young Jessie. Additionally, he called Earl Palmer of the Shods and Scott Pittman of the Frank Morey Band his favorite drummers. Zach Brines described in an interview that the cover versions of Over the Counter Culture are the musical roots of the band, namely: Anti-Nowhere League, Peter and the Test Tube Babies, Blitz, Stiff Little Fingers, Eater, Hank Ballard and the Midnighters as well as Young Jessie. In another interview, he said that Boston's music scene as a whole has inspired him, as all the bands have influenced each other and share a common spirit. More famous names that Thomas Lorioux mentioned several times as influences in terms of technique, style and stage presence were: Willie Dixon's work with Memphis Slim, Viorel Vlad from Taraf de Haïdouks, Jimmy Sutton (see JD McPherson), Steve Whitehouse from Frenzy, the Sharks, Blue Cats and Restless, Simon Langhart from the Peacocks, Alain Marietti from Happy Drivers, Jonny Bridgwood from The Sting-rays, Eric Haamers from Batmobile, Holly from Mad Sin and Rob Peltier from the Quakes.

== Legacy ==
Although the Kings of Nuthin's career was cut short by the untimely death of their singer Torr Skoog in 2013, they left behind a strong discography and an unforgettable live reputation including equipment set on fire. Their musical legacy stems from the tension between the rebellion of 1950s rock'n'roll and the aggressive rhetoric of punk, whose sound they enriched with their unusual choice of instruments such as double bass, piano, washboard and tenor/baritone saxophones.

== Members and session/touring musicians ==
According to the Kings of Nuthin's bassist Spike Katz, who Slick said was once accepted to the Juilliard School, the band had an excellent mix of musicians, half of whom studied at Berklee. The band has been backed by session musician Jon Natchez on all songs from their last two albums and have been replaced live by touring musicians such as Matt Murphy, Tom Quartulli and Anant Pradhan.

Former members

- Torr Skoog – upright bass (1996–1998), lead vocals (1998–2013)
- Liam Crill – drums (1997–2013)
- Danny Edge – tenor saxophone (1998–2000)
- Zack Brines – piano (1998–2013)
- Chris Wilkinson – washboard (1998–2002, 2004–2008)
- Slick – rhythm guitar, vocals (1998), tenor & baritone saxophone (2001–2003)
- Justin Hubbard – electric guitar (1998–2004)
- Spike Katz – upright bass (1999–2004)
- Tommy Bellevue – tenor saxophone (2001–2002), baritone saxophone (2003–2004)
- Hayden Cummings – tenor saxophone (2003–2005)
- Thomas Lorioux – upright bass (2004–2005)
- Trafton Waldrop – electric guitar (2004–2005)

Former session musicians*

- Jon Natchez – baritone saxophone (2005)
- Dana Colley – bass saxophone (2005)

(*on more than one song)

Former touring musicians

- Jon Natchez – baritone saxophone (2000)
- Matt Murphy – upright bass (2003–2004)
- Tom Quartulli – tenor saxophone (2003–2007)
- Anant Pradhan – baritone saxophone (2005)

Timeline

== Discography ==
=== Studio albums ===
- Get Busy Livin' or Get Busy Dyin' (2000)
- Fight Songs for Fuck-Ups (2002)
- Punk Rock Rhythm & Blues (2005) /
  Over the Counter Culture (2006)
- Old Habits Die Hard (2010)

=== Singles ===
- Shit out of Luck (2001)
- The Kings of Nuthin' / The Briggs (2004)

== See also ==
- List of rockabilly musicians
- List of psychobilly bands
- List of street punk bands
- List of songs about Boston
