= Aaron Seeman =

American musician

Aaron Seeman is an American composer, pianist, and accordion player, who has distinguished himself by adapting punk rock, popular music, show tunes, and cartoon theme songs for the accordion, as Duckmandu.

Duckmandu's repertoire also includes adaptations of Klezmer, Classical Country, and Polka pieces, as well as conventional accordion repertoire - polkas and tangos - at bar mitzvahs, weddings and Oktoberfest celebrations.

Duckmandu performance sets include such diverse material as the Dead Kennedys, Beethoven, the Power Puff Girls theme song, and a musical rendition of the Periodic Table of the Elements.

Maximum Rock 'n Roll, the premier punk magazine, pronounced him "warble for warble spot-on Jello" for his note-for-note renditions of the entire first Dead Kennedys album, Fresh Fruit for Rotting Vegetables. He currently resides in Oakland, California.

== Bands ==
Seeman was a founding member of the eclectic Romanian Music-inspired folk group Fishtank Ensemble. Seeman is a founding member, arranger, and vocalist with San Francisco's Punk Rock Orchestra, which performs full scale orchestral versions of classic punk songs. He also plays accordion in the bands Shamalamacord, Polkacide, and Red Hot Chachkas.

== Discography ==
- Shut the Duck up and Play your Accordion (2007)
- Fishtank Ensemble, Live at the Freight & Salvage (2007, DVD of live performance of Fishtank Ensemble)
- Samurai Over Serbia (2007, with Fishtank Ensemble)
- Fresh Duck for Rotting Accordianists (2005)
- Super Raoul (2005, with Estradasphere)
- Fishtank at the Fishtank (2004, with Fishtank Ensemble)
- It's Understood (2000, with Estradasphere)
- California (1999, with Mr. Bungle)
