= Something Bad =

Something Bad or variants may refer to:

- "Somethin' Bad", song by Miranda Lambert and Carrie Underwood from the album Platinum
- "Something Bad", song by Stephen Schwartz from the musical Wicked
- "Something Bad", song by The Fatima Mansions from album Lost in the Former West
- "Something Bad", song by Robin Thicke from the album Paula
- "Something Bad", song by Hi-Fi and the Roadburners from the album Fear City
