= Cigar store Indian (disambiguation) =

A Cigar store Indian is an advertisement figure made to represent tobacconists.

Cigar store Indian may also refer to:

- The Cigar Store Indian, Seinfeld TV episode
- Cigar Store Indians, American band
