= Wild Target =

2010 film by Jonathan Lynn

- Theatrical release poster
- Directed by: Jonathan Lynn
- Screenplay by: Lucinda Coxon
- Based on: Wild Target by Pierre Salvadori
- Produced by: Martin Pope; Michael Rose
- Starring: Bill Nighy; Emily Blunt; Rupert Grint; Eileen Atkins; Martin Freeman; Rupert Everett
- Cinematography: David Johnson
- Edited by: Michael Parker
- Music by: Michael Price
- Production companies: CinemaNX; Isle of Man Film; Magic Light Pictures; Matador Pictures
- Distributed by: Rézo Films (France); Entertainment Film Distributors (United Kingdom)
- Release dates: 8 April 2010 (Beaune Film Festival); 18 June 2010 (United Kingdom); 7 July 2010 (France)
- Running time: 98 minutes
- Countries: France; United Kingdom
- Languages: English; French
- Budget: $8 million
- Box office: $3.5 million

Wild Target is a 2010 black comedy film directed by Jonathan Lynn, written by Lucinda Coxon, and starring Bill Nighy, Emily Blunt, Rupert Grint, Eileen Atkins, Martin Freeman, and Rupert Everett. It is a remake of the 1993 French film of the same name.

== Plot ==
Victor Maynard is a reclusive hit-man perpetuating a family line of professional assassins. His father, a well-known assassin, is deceased, but he operates under the constant watchful gaze of his domineering mother, Louisa, who wants him to preserve the family reputation.

Rose is an ingenious con artist, who manages to sell a fake Rembrandt, painted by her friend in the Restoration Department of the National Gallery, to Ferguson, a billionaire, for £900,000. Ferguson responds by hiring Victor to assassinate her. Victor takes the contract, but misses several opportunities to kill her, finally giving up the attempt entirely as he falls in love with his intended victim.

Thwarting another assassin's attempt to kill Rose, Victor encounters Tony, an apparently homeless young man, who is thrown into the already complex lives of Victor and Rose. For a while Victor mistakenly wonders if he is sexually attracted to Tony, but later adopts the young man as a protégé and apprentice in the assassination business.

Ferguson, still determined to have his revenge, hires Dixon, reputed to be second only to Victor in proficiency, to kill both Rose and Victor. While staying at a luxurious hotel to hide from Ferguson's men, the trio are discovered and Ferguson chases them in the street, resulting in a car crash where Ferguson becomes grievously injured, and the trio successfully escapes.

Dixon, with a henchman, tracks the trio to the Maynard family home, deep in the English countryside. Louisa kills the henchman, but Dixon grabs Victor's father's Mauser gun to kill Victor. The gun turns out to be a booby trap, which fires backward due to a clogged barrel, killing Dixon. Victor and Rose bury the two assassins.

Three years later, Victor and Rose are married and have a son named Angel. While eating lunch outside their house, Tony comes out and asks where the family cat is; and Victor sees that his son has killed and buried the cat discreetly. Victor proudly smiles at his son, realizing that his son has what it takes to be his successor.

== Cast ==
- Bill Nighy as Victor Maynard: A middle aged hit man who is hired by Ferguson to kill Rose after she cons Ferguson out of £900,000. After purposely missing an opportunity to shoot Rose, Ferguson sends his henchmen to do the deed. Victor kills one henchman and injures another when he is looking for Rose and, concealing his true profession, helps her escape with the help of local slacker, Tony. He adopts Tony as his apprentice and Victor realises he's fallen in love with Rose.
- Emily Blunt as Rose: A con artist who oversteps the mark when she cons Ferguson out of £900,000 and leaves him with a convincing copy of a Rembrandt self-portrait. Realizing the danger she is in, she stays with Victor and Tony in an attempt to escape her attempted assassination. Her adventurous lifestyle takes a turn when she realises her enjoyment of Victor's company.
- Rupert Grint as Tony: A young man who witnesses Victor shooting Ferguson's bodyguard and decides to stay with Victor for safety. Victor employs him as an apprentice (with Tony thinking Victor is a private detective and later, upon learning Victor is a hit man, taking it in stride) and he soon realizes he has a 'killer instinct'.
- Eileen Atkins as Louisa Maynard: Victor's intimidating mother who, while impressed with his profession, is concerned as to what will happen to the family business.
- Rupert Everett as Ferguson: A London gangster who hires Victor to kill Rose.
- Martin Freeman as Hector Dixon: A sadistic assassin who plays second-fiddle to Victor Maynard. While influenced by Victor, Dixon jumps at the opportunity given to him by Ferguson to dispose of the greatest hit-man ever known.
- Gregor Fisher as Mike: Ferguson's incompetent henchman whose several attempts to kill Victor, Rose, and Tony leave him in hospital with one ear.
- Geoff Bell as Fabian: Dixon's dull-witted partner.
- Rory Kinnear as Gerry

== Production ==
The film was backed by a film fund established by the Isle of Man, and was produced by Martin Pope and Michael Rose. Lucinda Coxon wrote the screenplay, based on the 1993 French film of the same name.

Filming began in London on 16 September 2008, with location shooting on the Isle of Man.

== Reception ==
=== Critical response ===
On the review aggregator website Rotten Tomatoes, 32% of 53 critics' reviews are positive, with an average rating of 4.8/10. The website's consensus reads: "An ineptly staged farce that dishonors the original film and squanders the comedic potential of its fine actors." Metacritic, which uses a weighted average, assigned the film a score of 41 out of 100, based on 13 critics, indicating "mixed or average" reviews.

David Jenkins, writing for Time Out, gave it two out of five stars, saying that it felt like nothing had been "thought through." The review in Empire also gave it two out of five stars, saying that the "talented cast keep some low-key action and tired gags from derailing this disappointing farce". One of the more favorable reviews was given by Steven Rea at The Philadelphia Inquirer, giving the film two-and-a-half out of four stars, praising its lead actors for carrying the "slight screwball thriller" and noting that the screenplay "delivers enough drolleries and a workable running gag or two."

=== Box office ===
Wild Target grossed $0.1 million in a very limited release (13 cinemas) in the United States and Canada, and $3.4 million in other territories, for a worldwide total of $3.5 million, against a budget of $8.0 million.

== Music ==
The soundtrack album for Wild Target was released on 4 May 2010 by Epic Records. It combines original score material composed by Michael Price and performed by the London Metropolitan Orchestra with additional songs by Regina Spektor, Imelda May, Yael Naim, Beach House, and Fishtank Ensemble, as well as classical pieces by Antonio Vivaldi, Wolfgang Amadeus Mozart and Ludwig van Beethoven.

Wild Target (Original Motion Picture Soundtrack)
No.	Title	Writer(s)	Artist(s)	Length
1.	"Opening Titles"	Michael Price	London Metropolitan Orchestra	2:17
2.	"Mehum Mato"	traditional (arr. Fabrice Martinez)	Fishtank Ensemble	4:22
3.	"Hotel Song"	Regina Spektor	Regina Spektor	3:27
4.	"Johnny Got a Boom Boom"	Imelda May	Imelda May	2:58
5.	"The Waves"	Liam Shachar	Liam Shachar featuring Joe Echo	4:24
6.	"All Over Me"	Tom Bell, Bennett Holland, Scott Moncrieff, Pete Simpson	Pete Simpson & Bennett Holland	4:14
7.	"'Spring' from The Four Seasons (Violin Concerto in E major, Op. 8 No. 1)"	Antonio Vivaldi	Cappella Istropolitana	3:29
8.	"In a Mellow Mood"	Michael J. McEvoy	The Freddie Carleone Quartet	2:17
9.	"Sinfonia Concertante – E-flat major, KV 364, 2nd Movement: Andante ma non troppo"	Wolfgang Amadeus Mozart	Cappella Istropolitana	2:57
10.	"Piano Sonata No. 8 in C minor"	Ludwig van Beethoven	Rupert Everett	1:02
11.	"Face the Dragon"	Fabrice Martinez	Fishtank Ensemble	4:04
12.	"New Soul"	Yael Naïm	Yael Naïm	3:31
13.	"Plug into the Machine"	Kevin Floyd	Dorp	3:33
14.	"Wedding Bell"	Victoria Legrand, Alex Scally	Beach House	3:55
15.	"Foot Massage"	Michael Price	London Metropolitan Orchestra	2:09
16.	"Going Up the Country"	Alan Wilson	Imelda May	0:59
17.	"Mayhem"	Imelda May	Imelda May	2:44
Total length:				52:30
