= Get Busy Livin' or Get Busy Dyin' =

EP by The Kings of Nuthin'
- Released: October 28, 2000
- Recorded: July 2000
- Studios: 7A West Studio, Boston, MA
- Genres: Punk rock; rockabilly; psychobilly; rock'n'roll
- Length: 24:28
- Label: Reckloose Records

The Kings of Nuthin' chronology
Get Busy Livin' or Get Busy Dyin' (2000)	Fight Songs for Fuck-Ups (2002)

Get Busy Livin' or Get Busy Dyin' is punk rock and rockabilly group The Kings of Nuthin's debut EP, which they recorded in Boston's 7A West Studio, just like their first demo tape from 1999. The EP was released on October 28, 2000 through Reckloose Records and on March 13, 2001 through the German label Crazy Love Records.

== Release and reception ==
Professional ratings
Review scores
Source	Rating
Ox-Fanzine	7/10
Boston Phoenix	2.5/3
Messed Up	6/6

Get Busy Livin' or Get Busy Dyin' was recorded and mixed by Michael Caglianone at Boston's 7A West Studio and mastered by Colin Decker at M Works in Cambridge, MA. Although recorded in just two days, the album captures the band's unique sound. In an interview with Ox-Fanzine, the band describes the songs as being dominated by a strong rockabilly influence. Studio owner Michael Caglianone sees it as 50's roots rock with a punk twist. A Boston Phoenix review presents their style as urban jump blues "bolstered by some tough punk attitude" and compares Torr Skoog's vocals to those of a cartoonish Tom Waits, while Suburban Voice writes of the most tortured throat singing since hardcore punk band Verbal Assault from Newport, RI. Punk Planet compares his voice to that of Dicky Barrett from the Mighty Mighty Bosstones, accompanied by a band whose sound is somewhere between the Stray Cats and the Brian Setzer Orchestra. The German punk zine Ox-Fanzine writes that the Kings of Nuthin' offer hard, fast and dirty rock'n'roll in its purest form, which lies somewhere between Stray Cats and The Meteors, and clearly stands out from the broad mass of neo-swing and rockabilly bands. A second reviewer of the magazine describes the album as "an extremely swinging combination of punk rock from the street, psychobilly and casual, laid-back rhythm & blues" and for the German magazine Mainstage, the mixture of jazz, swing and rockabilly with street punk is simply a musical insider tip.

== Track listing ==
All songs written by the Kings of Nuthin', except where noted.

Get Busy Livin' or Get Busy Dyin' track listing
No.	Title	Writer(s)	Length
1.	"Let It Burn"		1:40
2.	"King for a Day"		2:08
3.	"Other Side of Hope"		2:24
4.	"Get Busy Livin' or Get Busy Dyin'"		3:03
5.	"Playing the Fool"		4:20
6.	"Miss April"		2:27
7.	"King of Nuthin'"		3:48
8.	"Boston Bound"		2:36
9.	"My Hometown"	Bob Crewe; Frank C. Slay Jr.	2:02
Total length:			24:28

== Personnel ==
Musicians

- Torr Skoog – lead vocals
- Justice Hubbard – electric guitar
- Zack Brines – piano
- Spike Katz – upright bass
- Danny Edge – baritone saxophone
- Liam Crill – drums
- Chris Wilkinson – washboard

Technical

- Colin Decker – mastering engineer
- Michael Caglianone – mixer, recording engineer

Artwork and design

- Alex Pina – artwork, illustration
- Tony Dowers – design
- Christine Allen – photography
- Kate Flock – photography
- Susan Slater – photography
