= Steve Nardella =

American songwriter

- Born: June 26, 1948 (age 77); Providence, Rhode Island, United States
- Genres: Blues, rock and roll, blues rock, rockabilly
- Occupation(s): Guitarist, singer, harmonicist, songwriter
- Instrument(s): Guitar, harmonica, vocals
- Years active: 1970s-present

Steve Nardella (born June 26, 1948, in Providence, Rhode Island, United States) is an American blues, rock and roll, blues rock and rockabilly guitarist and singer. The Allmusic journalist, Cub Koda, described Nardella as a "strong, American roots-music performer, equally adept at rockabilly and low-down blues".

== Biography ==
Nardella became proficient on both guitar and harmonica by his late teens, and by the late 1960s was in the Black Cat Blues Band with Duke Robillard, Johnny Nicholas and Fran Christina. By 1971, Nardella, Nicholas and Christina had all relocated to Ann Arbor, Michigan. Nardella then instigated the Boogie Brothers band with Sarah Brown, Nicholas and Christina. They backed a variety of blues musicians who toured locally, and were on the bill at the 1972 Ann Arbor Blues and Jazz Festival, both as backing to Johnny Shines and Boogie Woogie Red, and in their own right. Their work appeared on the Atlantic Records album, Ann Arbor Blues & Jazz Festival: 1972.

By the following year, the band name had changed its name to the Vipers and included the guitarist George Bedard. Their single, "Huron River Drive", was the first record to be released by Blind Pig Records. In 1974, Nardella backed Bobo Jenkins on his album Here I Am a Fool in Love Again. Other session musicians used included Brown and Christina.

Nardella and Bedard then formed the Silvertones, who toured across the United States and released the 1977 album, One Chance With You, also on Blind Pig. In addition to his harmonica playing, Nardella introduced more of his own guitar work and singing to their output. With a change of personnel, in 1979 the renamed Steve Nardella Band issued It's All Rock & Roll. The Steve Nardella Band lasted from 1978 to 1984.

Nardella eventually became a solo artist and for years both toured and played backing to other musicians. His next album, Daddy Rollin' Stone, did not appear until 1993. The same year, Nardella's trio backed Eddie Burns on his Scandinavian tour. Nardella also led the touring backing band for Jack Scott.

In June 2008, Nardella, Bedard and their one time band pianist Mr. B (Mark Lincoln Braun), played a reunion concert in Ann Arbor's Firefly Club. Nardella, with varying backing musicians, continues to perform live.

== Discography ==
- It's All Rock & Roll (1979) - Blind Pig Records
- Daddy Rollin' Stone (1993) - Schoolkids Records

== See also ==
- List of blues musicians
- List of blues rock musicians
- List of rockabilly musicians
