= Fight Songs for Fuck-Ups =

Studio album by The Kings of Nuthin'
- Released: September 17, 2002
- Recorded: April 2002
- Studios: Outpost Studio, Stoughton, MA
- Genres: Punk rock; rock'n'roll; rockabilly; rhythm and blues
- Length: 37:36
- Label: Disaster Records
- Producer: Ronnie Cook

The Kings of Nuthin' chronology
| Get Busy Livin' or Get Busy Dyin' (2000) | Fight Songs for Fuck-Ups (2002) | Over the Counter Culture (2006) |

Singles from Fight Songs for Fuck-Ups
- 1. "Shit out of Luck"

Fight Songs for Fuck-Ups is the first full-length album by punk rock and rockabilly group The Kings of Nuthin'. It was recorded at Outpost Studio in Stoughton, MA in April 2002 and was released on September 17, 2002 through Disaster Records.

== Critical reception ==
Professional ratings
Review scores
| Source | Rating |
|---|---|
| AllMusic | 3/5 stars |
| Punknews.org | 4.5/5 stars |
| Suburban Voice | 10/10 |
| Ox-Fanzine | 8/10 |
| Messed Up | 5/6 |

On the album Fight Songs for Fuck-Ups, the Kings of Nuthin' moved away stylistically from the psychobilly of their debut EP in favor of rhythm & blues. Their new recording engineer Jim Siegel made "the big band sound even bigger". The album is described in an AllMusic review as follows: "The mid-20th century roots elements are supplied by the saxes, piano, washboard, and standup bass. The punk comes across in the manic fast tempos, fuzzy guitars, singer Torr's gruff half-or-more grunt-shouted vocals, the hardcore-like trade-offs between the lead singing and backup anthemic choruses, and abrasive lyrics." Punknews.org rated their album four and a half out of five stars, writing that the "songs are all incredibly catchy" and the sound mix of their "hyper-rockabilly style filled with horns, piano and sing-along choruses" is great. The Ox-Fanzine describes an "extremely swinging combination of punk rock from the street, psychobilly and casual-loungy rhythm & blues", played by a complete R&B line-up, as was common in the fifties and Exclaim! generally perceives something special and unique in the combination of the instruments with the smart and sassy songwriting. A review in the Swedish Skrutt Magazine noted that the band appeared to enjoy themselves while performing, attributing this enthusiasm to their love of music. The Suburban Voice writes: "Like a punk rock version of the Brian Setzer Orchestra on speed". The German punk zine Plastic Bomb writes about the album released on the label of U.S. Bombs singer Duane Peters: "As if the Mighty Mighty Bosstones were playing songs by Little Richard in the style of Brian Setzer. Only twice as fast", "with a crazy mix of rockabilly, swing'n'jive and rudimentary garage punk". Lollipop magazine compares Torr Skoog's voice to those of Dicky Barrett of the Bosstones or Tom Waits and attests to his lyrics' great sense of humor and the band's amazingly authentic way of bringing back the neglected elements of swing. The magazine comes to the conclusion that with "their stellar musicianship and impeccable style, a more perfect album is scarce." For The Nerve it is a modern classic, commenting: "It’s what swing would've sounded like if punk had happened first." No. 13 comes to a similar conclusion: "Kind of like if Bill Haley and The Comets had been Punk Rockers" and considers it one of the best albums of the year.

== Track listing ==
All songs written by the Kings of Nuthin'.

Fight Songs for Fuck-Ups track listing
| No. | Title | Length |
|---|---|---|
| 1. | "Intro/New Thing Nuthin'" | 1:55 |
| 2. | "Shit out of Luck" | 2:04 |
| 3. | "Waitin' to Leave" | 1:42 |
| 4. | "Nuthin' to Loose" | 3:14 |
| 5. | "Where Do We Go?" | 1:45 |
| 6. | "The Kids Will Have No Say" | 2:42 |
| 7. | "La Chupacabra" | 3:08 |
| 8. | "Greasy Corpse" | 3:04 |
| 9. | "Drive All Night" | 2:30 |
| 10. | "Iron Out The Ivory" | 3:37 |
| 11. | "Callin' to Let You Know" | 2:24 |
| 12. | "All I've Lost" | 2:00 |
| 13. | "Nailhead" | 2:33 |
| 14. | "Another Year" | 2:12 |
| 15. | "11 to 3" | 2:12 |
| 16. | "Fight Song For Fuck Ups" | 2:45 |
| Total length: | | 37:36 |

== Personnel ==
Musicians

- Torr Skoog – lead vocals
- Justin Hubbard – electric guitar
- Zack Brines – piano
- Spike Katz – upright bass
- Liam Crill – drums
- Chris Wilkinson – washboard
- Slick – baritone saxophone
- Tommy Bellevue – tenor saxophone

Technical

- Dave Schultz – mastering engineer
- Jim Siegel – mixer, recording engineer
- John Cohan – drum technician

Artwork and design

- Amy Archer – cover photo, photography
- Tom D. Klein – cover art, tray card
- Tony Dowers – design
