= Heathen Apostles =

American gothic band

The Heathen Apostles
- Genre: Gothic country
- Years active: 2013—present
- Label: Ratchet Blade Records
- Members: Mather Louth; Chopper Franklin; Luis Mascaro; George Pearson
- Website: heathenapostles.com

The Heathen Apostles are a gothic Americana band formed in 2013 by Chopper Franklin and Mather Louth, who perform a mix of western music, with post-punk and gothic rock elements. Two of their albums have been included in "best of the year" lists by Folk N Rock magazine.

== Career ==
Heathen Apostles began when vocalist Mather Louth, formerly of Radio Noir, and guitarist Chopper Franklin, a multi-instrumentalist known for his past with the Cramps and as a key figure in the Gothic Americana genre, met and shared their interest in all things dark and Western. They recruited upright bassist Thomas Lorioux, from the group the Kings of Nuthin', and violinist Luis Mascaro. Heathen Apostles have actively toured the United States and parts of Europe. In 2019, proceeds from their benefit song "Paradise Lost" went towards victims of the California wildfires. In October and November of 2025, Heathen Apostles played a string of dates in support of Fields of the Nephilim for their 40th anniversary tour

== Discography ==
- Boot Hill Hymnal (2013)
- Without A Trace EP (2014)
- Fire to the Fuse (2015)
- Evil Spirits EP (2015)
- Requiem For A Remix (2016)
- Misery and Gin EP (2016)
- Strange Flowers (2017)
- Bloodgrass Vol. I EP (2017)
- Bloodgrass Vol. I & II (2018)
- The Fall EP (2018)
- Born By Lightning EP (2019)
- Dust to Dust (2019)
- Prayers Before The Plague (2020)
- The Goodbye Family EP (2021)
- Bloodgrass Vol. 3 EP (2021)
- Bloodgrass Vol. 3 & 4 (2022)
- Gothic Western Haunt (2023)
- The In Between (2024)
- No Peace - Split EP (2026)

== Collaborations discography ==
- Gothic country Evil Spirits EP with Jyrki 69, produced and mixed by Chopper Franklin, lyrics by Mather Louth, and vocals by Jyrki 69 and Mather Louth.
