= Old Habits Die Hard (album) =

Studio album by The Kings of Nuthin'
- Released: May 11, 2010
- Recorded: May–June 2005
- Studio: Outpost Studio, Stoughton, Massachusetts
- Genre: Punk rock; rockabilly; rhythm and blues
- Length: 42:15
- Label: Sailor's Grave Records
- Producer: Ronnie Cook

The Kings of Nuthin' chronology
| Over the Counter Culture (2006) | Old Habits Die Hard (2010) |

Old Habits Die Hard by punk rock and rockabilly group The Kings of Nuthin' was recorded at Outpost Studio in Stoughton, Massachusetts, in March 2007 and was released in May 2010, through Sailor's Grave Records.

== Release and reception ==
Professional ratings
Review scores
| Source | Rating |
|---|---|
| Punknews.org | 4/5 stars |
| laut.de | 4/5 stars |
| Ox-Fanzine | 4/5 stars |
| Upstarter | 4/5 stars |
| Classic Rock | 7/10 |
| Plattentests.de | 8/10 |
| BurnYourEars | 9/10 |

The album Old Habits Die Hard was released on May 11, 2010 on Sailor's Grave Records. Like the two previous albums, it was recorded at Outpost studio in Stoughton, MA (Dropkick Murphys, The Mighty Mighty Bosstones, The Ducky Boys, The Unseen, Blood for Blood), and well received by the press: "Like a fine wine aging its way to perfection", the band, which also includes "one of the tightest brass sections of Boston", "has never felt so cohesive". Their "50's rock & roll hybrid with punk" has been described as more complex than before, with its interesting tempo changes and time signatures. Razorcake is convinced that the "perfectly executed, swinging, Bill Haley and the Comets-inspired bar room rock and roll" album is definitely the best thing they have released since their early days. In their reviews, the German magazines Metalinside and BurnYourEars come to the conclusions that the album is full to the brim "with raw energy and the most wonderful harbor dive charm", that it is "great fun from front to back" and that it has become a great piece of music history without any weaknesses.

== Track listing ==
All tracks are written by Torr Skoog and Zack Brines.

Old Habits Die Hard track listing
| No. | Title | Length |
|---|---|---|
| 1. | "Black & Blue" | 2:06 |
| 2. | "Dead Set Again" | 1:55 |
| 3. | "Same Situation" | 2:42 |
| 4. | "Old Habits" | 1:47 |
| 5. | "Promise Not a Threat" | 1:17 |
| 6. | "The List" | 2:54 |
| 7. | "Bystander" | 2:31 |
| 8. | "No Responsibility" | 2:52 |
| 9. | "Shitsville U.S.A." | 2:33 |
| 10. | "Sick & Tired" | 2:09 |
| 11. | "Silver City" | 2:44 |
| 12. | "Asleep at the Wheel" | 2:45 |
| 13. | "Man Down" | 1:22 |
| 14. | "Flake" | 1:13 |
| 15. | "Expiration Date" | 1:49 |
| 16. | "You're Fucked" | 1:30 |
| 17. | "Rhythm & Booze" | 2:33 |
| 18. | "Congratulations" | 4:54 |

== Personnel ==
Musicians

- Torr Skoog – lead vocals
- Zack Brines – piano
- Liam Crill – drums
- Chris Wilkinson – washboard
- Hayden Cummings – tenor saxophone
- Trafton Waldrop – electric guitar
- Thomas Lorioux – upright bass
- Jon Natchez – baritone saxophone
- Dana Colley – bass saxophone (1,6,8,17)
- Lenny Lashley – vocals (3)
- Kevin P. Stevenson – vocals (9)
- Stephanie Dougherty – vocals (11)
- Dana Smythe – cello (18)
- Kamiko Curran – violin (18)

Technical

- Dave Locke – mastering engineer
- Jim Siegel – mixer, recording engineer

Artwork and design

- Amy Archer – cover photo, photography
- Angela Smith – photography, artwork
