= Fishtank Ensemble =

American gypsy rock music group

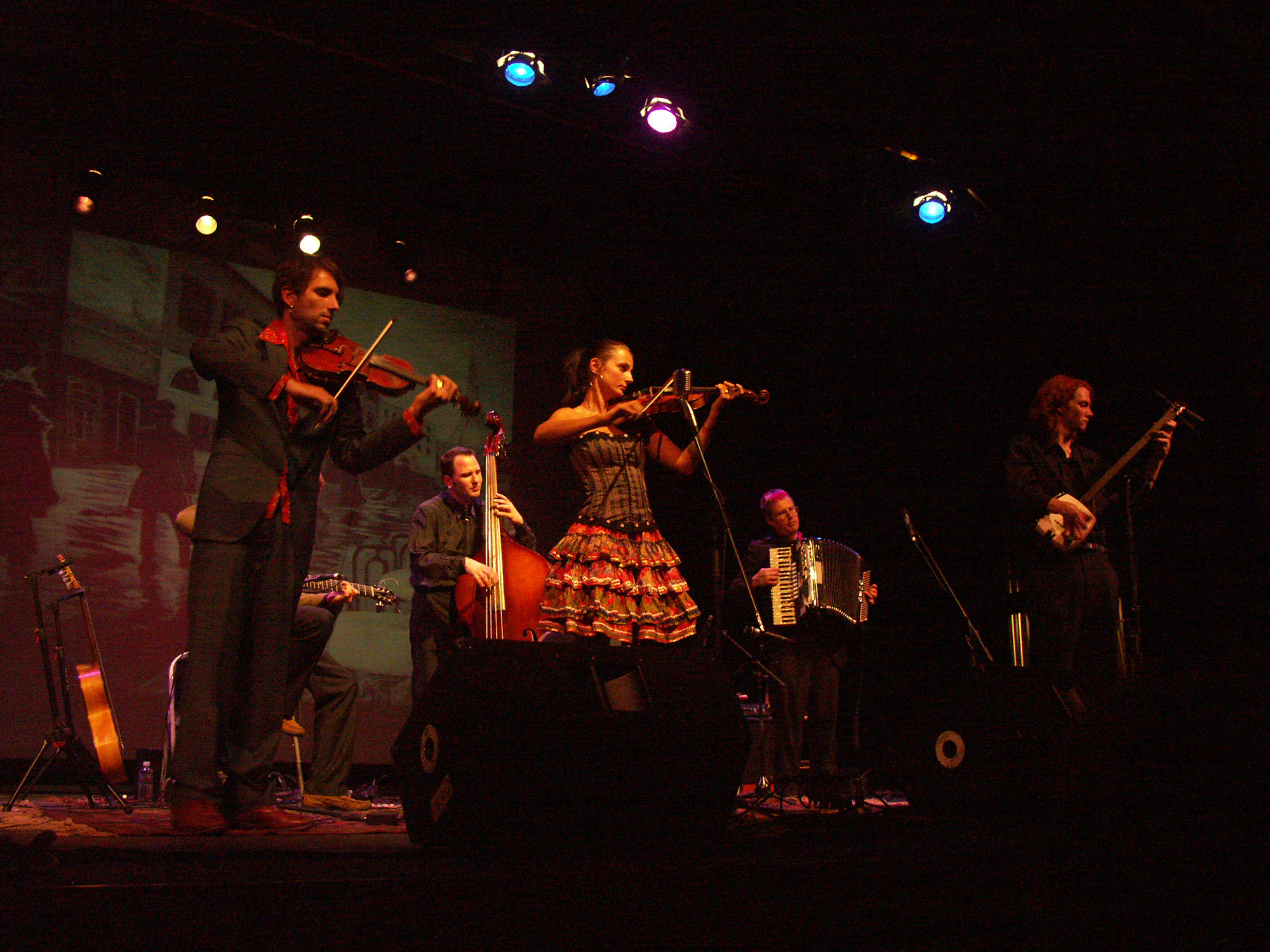
- Fishtank Ensemble, Djangofest Northwest Sept. 22, 2007 – Set 3 SWHS – Whidbey Island, WA

Background information
- Origin: Oakland, California; France
- Genres: folk rock, gypsy rock
- Years active: 2004–2021
- Members: Fabrice Martinez; Ursula Knudson; Douglas Smolens; Djordje Stijepovic
- Past members: Kevin Kmetz; Tim Smolens; Glenn Allen; Adam Stacey; Aaron Seeman; Mike Penny; Josh Petrojvic; Justin Petrojvic
- Website: Official website

Fishtank Ensemble was a gypsy rock music group from Los Angeles, California, known for their unique, high-energy and virtuosic stage show that blends a wide range of styles including Balkan, Romanian, gypsy, French hot jazz, flamenco, Turkish, Greek, and rock 'n' roll.

== Band history ==
Fishtank Ensemble first formed and performed together at The Fishtank in Oakland, California in January 2004. They are one of many bands to be commonly associated with the California-based eclectic indie band Estradasphere. The band's premiere performances were recorded live. These recordings would become the band's debut full-length CD, Super Raoul, which was released November 2005.

In November 2007, Fishtank Ensemble self-released a second full-length album of material called Samurai Over Serbia. On Samurai Over Serbia, traditional eastern European, gypsy jazz, klezmer and original tunes are arranged to fit the ensemble’s unconventional, but imaginative sound.

In recent years, the group has been performing consistently throughout the United States and Europe.

In 2010, the band released their 3rd full-length CD, Woman in Sin. Like the ones before this, it featured a unique and unusual blend of traditional and original music and was both self-produced and self-released.

In 2021, on the band's Facebook page, it was announced that the group had disbanded, but they disbanded in 2015 following the divorce of two of their founding members.

== Band bio ==
LA Weekly has referred to Fishtank Ensemble as "cross pollinated gypsy music ... one of the most thrilling young acts on the planet." Formed in 2005 and having since performed in a variety of venues, including street performances, the band consisted of two violins, bass, musical saw, guitar, trombone, vocals, accordion and banjolele. The band's diverse style has been compared to French hot jazz, Serbian and Transylvanian gypsy anthems and Flamenco, amongst others.

The dynamic quartet that comprises Fishtank Ensemble take their roots both from their own varied musical and national backgrounds, as well as from their adventures and travels. Their singer, Ursula, sang opera on the streets and town squares of Italy, until she found a love of gypsy music. Their French violinist voyaged around all of Europe in a handmade mule-drawn caravan for ten years, collecting music and experiences. Their Serbian bass player has spent time playing with gypsies as well as some of the rock and roll's legends, and the guitarist is a master of flamenco and gypsy jazz guitar who honed his craft in the gypsy caves of Granada, Spain.

== Band members ==
=== Current members ===
- 2004 to 2021 - Fabrice Martinez; violin and violintromba.
- 2004 to 2021 - Ursula Knudson; saw, vocals, violin, banjolele, percussion, theremin
- 2004 to 2021 - Douglas Smolens (aka El Douje); flamenco guitar.
- 2007 to 2021 - Djordje Stijepovic; Double bass.

=== Past members ===
- 2004 to 2008 - Aaron Seeman (aka Duckmandu); accordion.
- 2004 to 2007 - Kevin Kmetz; shamisen
- 2004 to 2006 - Tim Smolens; double bass (recording sessions)
- 2004 to 2005 - Glenn Allen; double bass (2005 tour)
- 2004 to 2005 - Adam Stacey; percussion
- 2007 to 2008 - Mike Penny; shamisen.

== Discography ==
- Fishtank at the Fishtank (2004) (limited release)
- Super Raoul (2005)
- Fishtank Ensemble, Live at the Freight & Salvage (2007) DVD of live performance, includes interviews with members.
- Samurai Over Serbia (2007)
- Woman in Sin (2010)
- Edge of the World (2014)

== Reviews ==
"The whimsical name of the group belies the fact that these musicians play hard, fast, and serious. There’s nothing fishy about them. In fact, there’s no slouching or mannered excesses, as Fishtank Ensemble comes armed, loaded and ready to serve you up a platter of intense nearly cosmic gypsy music."—Joel Okida
