= Wild Target (1993 film) =

1993 film by Pierre Salvadori

- Directed by: Pierre Salvadori
- Written by: Pierre Salvadori
- Starring: Jean Rochefort; Marie Trintignant; Guillaume Depardieu
- Music by: Philippe Eidel
- Release date: 18 August 1993
- Running time: 80 minutes
- Country: France
- Language: French

Wild Target (French: Cible émouvante) is a 1993 French comedy film written and directed by Pierre Salvadori. Its plot revolves around an aging hitman who falls for his much younger target and ends up protecting her. A remake directed by Jonathan Lynn was released in 2010.

== Selected cast ==
- Jean Rochefort as Victor Meynard
- Marie Trintignant as Renée Dandrieux
- Guillaume Depardieu as Antoine
- Serge Riaboukine as Manu
- Patachou as Madame Meynard
