= Ace and the Ragers =

American rock band

- Also known as: The Moonglows; The Swordsmen
- Origin: Chagrin Falls, Cleveland, Ohio, U.S.
- Genres: Rock and roll; rockabilly
- Years active: 1993—2001
- Labels: Pin-Up Records (US and UK, 1998–2001); Hepcat Records (US, 1998–2001)
- Past members: Jason Borkowski Lead vocals, Guitar; Bryan McCleery String Bass; Todd Nelson Saxophones; Joe Ryan Saxophones; Mike Molnar Lead Guitar; Craig Ramsey Drums
- Website: www.ragers.com

Ace and the Ragers was an American rock band from the Cleveland, Ohio suburb of Chagrin Falls. Ace and the Ragers also played shows anonymously under the guise of The Moonglows or The Swordsmen.

== Early years ==
Ace and the Ragers were formed in 1993 in response to the growing number of local North Coast area punk and hardcore bands enjoying success without the benefit of major label representation or promotion. Inspired by bands like the Ramones, the Ragers stormed onto the scene by adopting a fast, noisy, and raw set of favorites from the 50s, played to a frenetic punk beat. That first set list consisted of covers of Rock Around the Clock, Blue Suede Shoes, At The Hop, Teenager in Love and Splish Splash, all played several times each, about 2 hours after the band was actually formed, and without the benefit of ever having actually played together (or having ever played their specific instruments) before the first note of the first show. The original Rager lineup was Todd Nelson on drums, Jason Borkowski (Ace) on guitar and vocals, and Bryan McCleery on bass.

The Ragers were then called upon to join a budding circuit for a bunch of fun little multi-band hardcore shows. Those first shows happened at spontaneous DIY hardcore "festivals" in the VFWs and basements of houses in unsuspecting neighborhoods. The highlight of these years was a 'spirited' winter formal dance at a penitentiary school. By then the Ragers' set list had grown to several hundred different songs.

The Ragers played around Ohio sparingly while each member pursued primary interests in the other bands (on other instruments) that they were currently involved in.

As the next few years went by, the Ragers' lineup shifted several times as they honed their sound, which by 1995 had evolved more towards a Bill Haley and Little Richard inspired Rock and Roll, including a shift from Fender Bass to String Bass for Bryan, a move from Drums to Sax for Todd, and the addition of Adam Buxton on Drums, Joe Ryan on Saxophone, and later a 15-year-old Mike Molnar on Guitar. Their sound evolved away from punk and more towards their R&B influences, like Roy Brown, Wynonie Harris, Big Joe Turner, and Louis Jordan, as well as the classic country/rockabilly-type acts coming out of Sun Studios in the 50s (Elvis, Roy Orbison, Jerry Lee and company).

By 1996, the Ragers were developing a growing catalog of original material, and were headlining regular shows at such classic (and many now defunct) Cleveland venues as The Grog Shop, Peabody's Down Under, and The Euclid Tavern. Later gigs at The Rock and Roll Hall Of Fame, The Agora and The Odeon would follow. In 1996, the Ragers recorded their first EP Alien Baby, which is now out of print and very rare. 1998 saw the release of their first studio album, Light This Sucker Up! which rose to #103 on the CMJ College Radio Top 200, and the follow-up release Ace and the Ragers Steal Your Girlfriend in 2000. All Ace and the Ragers records have been released on Bryan & Jason's own Pin-Up Records, based out of Chagrin Falls, Ohio, and distributed through Hepcat Records in Irvine, California.

== Touring years ==
From 1998 through 1999, Ace and the Ragers all quit their day jobs and toured heavily throughout the Midwest, Deep South, Canada, and the U.S. East Coast, playing around 150 shows in that two-year time. The Ragers visited a number of cities in Ohio, Illinois, Michigan, Pennsylvania, Indiana, Missouri, Ontario, New York, Massachusetts, West Virginia, Tennessee, Virginia, Georgia, Alabama, Louisiana, Mississippi, North Carolina, and South Carolina. But the coolest little city in America, as stated by Ace and the Ragers themselves, was a little town (that they visited whenever they could) in Central New York called Alfred.

== Later years ==
In 2000 (after the van broke down), Ace and the Ragers began settling down and playing private gigs, society events, and large Northeast Ohio events. The band decided in 2000 to go on a hiatus, as Mike had left to go on tour with Ronnie Dawson and a later stint with The Bellfuries, Bryan got married, Todd moved to Las Vegas to pursue the casino lifestyle, Jason moved to California to galvanize his Rock and Roll positioning, and Joe moved to State College PA to pick up a couple of graduate degrees, including most recently his PhD in Material Sciences. In 2003, Craig, Todd and Bryan formed the Punk band Tough Guy. Jason, Mike, and Craig then reconvened in Austin, TX in 2004 to form The Reasons. Todd joined up (on drums) with The Capgun Cowboys later that same year.

Ace and the Ragers try to get together at least once a year for some sort of reunion show, usually around the Christmas or Blossom Time seasons. In 2005, the Ragers recorded their 4th full-length album, this one live, which is (as of 2006) still unreleased and unnamed.

== Careers after Ace and the Ragers ==
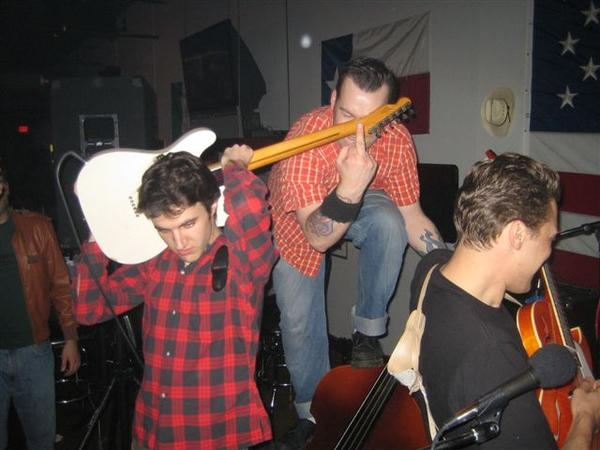
Ace and the Ragers, 2005

As of the end of 2006:

- Jason, Adam, and Mike are now in Austin, TX touring as The Jungle Rockers.
- Craig is now the drummer for several working acts, the pop bands Kiddo, Bears, and The Lovekill.
- Todd still occasionally plays with The Capgun Cowboys.
- Bryan is back in Cleveland, currently retired.
- Joe is a scientist at the Pacific Northwest National Laboratory.

== Discography ==
- Alien Baby (1996), Pin-Up Records
- Light This Sucker Up! (1998), Pin-Up Records
- Steal Your Girlfriend! (2000), Pin-Up Records
- Untitled Ace and the Ragers Live Project (2009) Pin-Up Records

== Current members ==
As of 2006:

- Jason Borkowski - Guitar, Singer, Songwriter (founding member)
- Bryan McCleery - Bass, and later String Bass (founding member)
- Todd Nelson - Drums (originally), later Alto and Tenor Saxophone (founding member)
- Joe Ryan - Alto (and later Baritone) Saxophone
- Mike Molnar - Guitar
- Craig Ramsey - Drums

== Past members ==
- Adam Buxton - Drums (on Alien Baby)
- Danny White - Guitar (touring)
- Keri Hlavin - Saxophone
