= Shit out of Luck =

Single by The Kings of Nuthin'

from the album Fight Songs for Fuck-Ups
- Released: 2001
- Recorded: 2001
- Studio: Wooly Mammoth Studios, Boston, MA
- Genre: Psychobilly; punk rock; rockabilly
- Length: 7:49
- Label: Haunted Town Records
- Songwriters: Torr Skoog; Zack Brines; Justin Hubbard; Spike Katz; Liam Crill; Chris Wilkinson; Slick; Tommy Bellevue
- Producer: The Kings of Nuthin'

The Kings of Nuthin' singles chronology
"Shit out of Luck" (2001)	"The Kings of Nuthin' / The Briggs" (2004)

"Shit out of Luck" is a song by Boston-based punk rock and rockabilly band The Kings of Nuthin'. It was released in 2001, through Haunted Town Records as a pre-album single for their debut album Fight Songs for Fuck-Ups (2002).

== Recording and composition ==
"Shit out of Luck" was recorded and mixed by Dave Westner at Wooly Mammoth Studios, Boston, MA, and mastered by mastering and lacquer cutting engineer Mark Richardson at M Works Mastering Studio, Cambridge, MA. All three songs of that single were written and produced by the Kings of Nuthin'.

== Release and reception ==
"Shit out of Luck" was released in 2001, through Haunted Town Records. It received generally positive response from music critics. A Razorcake review states that the singer, who sounds like he's chain-smoking filterless cigarettes, sings with gruff humor about being devastated. Richie Unterberger of AllMusic writes: "You are not, after all, apt to hear swing or rockabilly bands play songs titled "Shit Out of Luck" [...]. The words are full of the frustration and disillusionment common to zillions of punk records, yet the music makes it all rather genial and good-natured." Ox-Fanzine calls "Shit out of luck" anthemic and Punknews.org writes that this 50s outlaw tune could work as background music in a Happy Days episode as well as on the Warped Tour main stage, while the incredibly catchy "Drive All Night" starts out country-ish and quickly becomes one of the best songs on the record.

== Track listing and formats ==
All songs written by the Kings of Nuthin'.

Side one
No.	Title	Length
1.	"Shit out of Luck"	2:09
Total length:		2:09

Side two
No.	Title	Length
1.	"Drive All Night"	3:10
2.	"The Stomp"	2:30
Total length:		5:40

== Credits and personnel ==
Musicians

- Torr Skoog – lead vocals
- Justice Hubbard – electric guitar
- Zack Brines – piano
- Spike Katz – upright bass
- Liam Crill – drums
- Chris Wilkinson – washboard
- Slick – baritone saxophone
- Tommy Bellevue – tenor saxophone

Technical

- Mark Richardson – mastering and lacquer cut engineer
- Dave Westner – mixer, recording engineer

Artwork and design

- Liam Crill – design and art
- Slick – design and art
- Christine Allen – photography
- Amy Archer – photography
- Sarah Shaugnessy – photography
- Tom Walsh – photography
- Angela Zajnac – photography
