= Super Raoul =

Studio album by Fishtank Ensemble
- Released: November 2005
- Recorded: Fishtank, Oakland, California
- Genre: Eclectic
- Length: 62:42
- Label: Mimicry Records (1st edition only)
- Producer: Fishtank Ensemble

Fishtank Ensemble chronology
Super Raoul (2005)	Samurai Over Serbia (2007)

Alternative covers
- Second edition album cover

Super Raoul is the debut LP from Fishtank Ensemble. The album was recorded live at Fishtank in Oakland, California in early 2004 and completed over the course of two weekends. At this time, the band had only been playing together for three weeks.

== Track listing ==
All tracks feature traditional music and/or lyrics except where noted.

1. "Bordeas" – 6:55
2. "Itty Bitty Snitty Little Frenchman" (A. Seeman, 2004) – 3:44
3. "Papirosen" (lyrics by H. Yablokoff, 1932) – 3:02
4. "Troll Wedding" – 6:37
5. "Pegasus Vaulters" (A. Seeman, 2004) – 3:33
6. "Ringo Bushi" (Narita Unchiku, 1954) – 2:51
7. "Arabu Andaluz" – 4:36
8. "Hora di Bucharest / Hora de Fabrice" – 6:48
9. "Le Kidnappeur"" (D. Smolens, K. Kmetz, 2004) – 6:22
10. "Hopa di Bida" – 4:10
11. "The Last Shamisen Master" (K. Kmetz, 2003) – 4:39
12. "Suite Romaine" – 4:42
13. "Doina Sonnambule" – 4:49

== First and second editions ==
Super Raoul has been released in two editions. The first edition was released through a limited Mimicry pressing and has a cover with a photograph montage that refers to the band as "Fishtank". There is no copyright on the disc.

The second edition was independently released. The album cover features a cartoon by Garth Kauffman on the cover and refers to the band as "Fishtank Ensemble".

Besides purely aesthetic differences, there are significant differences between the sound quality of the releases. Though both of the CDs have the same tracks in the same order, the Mimicry pressing of Super Raoul is inferior to the quality of the independent pressing; notably so on the songs "Hora di Bucharest/Hora de Fabrice" and "Suite Romaine". On the Mimicry pressing, these songs "skip", then abruptly silence repeatedly. This is most likely due to an error in transferring the data of the tracks. On the second edition, these tracks do not have such problems. Though the first edition is technically inferior in quality, it is perhaps likely to become a collector's item.

Many consumers who have purchased the first edition CD from CD Baby have been sent a replacement CD along with a short note of apology.

== Personnel ==
- Fabrice Martinez - violin, violumba
- Ursula Knudsen - vocals, saw, violin
- Kevin Kmetz - shamisen
- Aaron Seeman - accordion
- El Douje (Doug Smolens) - guitar
- Tim Smolens - acoustic bass
- Adam Stacey - percussion, accordion on "Le Kidnapeur"
