= Gene Lamarr =

American singer and guitarist

Eugene Lamarr Syrios (February 7, 1942 – April 8, 2007), known as Gene Lamarr (or La Marr), was an American rockabilly singer and guitarist.

Born in Atlanta, Georgia, he grew up in San Diego, California, and learned guitar. By the age of 12 he was playing in a local bar band, Joel Hill & the Strangers, and around 1956 he formed his own band, the Blue Flames. In 1958, he signed to the Spry record label, and recorded a song by Gaynel Hodge, "That Crazy Little House on the Hill". It became a local hit, and was followed up with "You Can Count On Me" and "Moon Eyes". Lamarr then set up his own label, Flame, and released the instrumental "Hammerhead", featuring his "ferocious guitar work". However, despite a strong local following, Lamarr's records were commercially unsuccessful, and after a final single in 1961, "Baby What Would You Do", he left the music business.

He worked for General Dynamics for twenty years before retiring in 1991. In latter years he also returned to music, playing guitar in bands around Poway, California, with musicians who included Gary Puckett and Bob Mosley. He set up a recording studio at his home and planned to release an album of new material. However, he died from heart failure in 2007, aged 65.

Several of his recordings, notably "That Crazy Little House on the Hill", have been reissued on CD compilations of rockabilly music.
