= Djordje Stijepovic =

American singer-songwriter

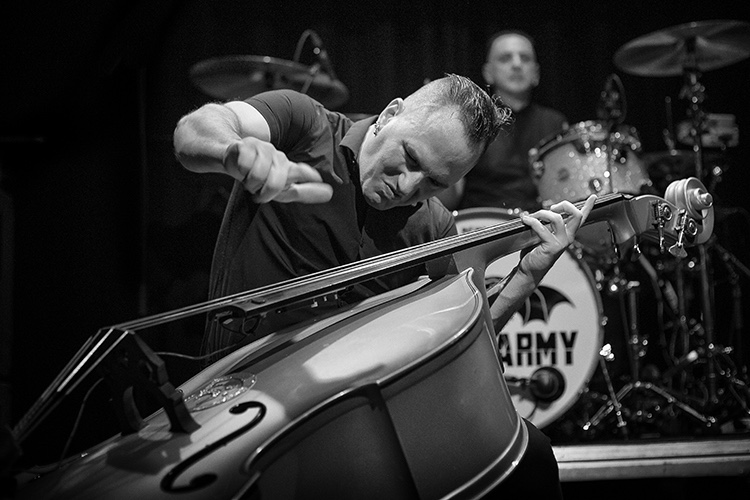
- Stijepovic performing in Eindhoven, Holland, in 2016
- Born: Belgrade, Serbia
- Occupations: Musician; bassist; composer; singer
- Years active: 1995–present
- Musical career
- Genres: Rockabilly; psychobilly; jazz; world music
- Instruments: Double bass; bass guitar; vocals; 2011 Blast Cult one4five custom ("The Great White")
- Website: www.djordjestijepovic.com

Djordje Stijepovic (Serbian: Ђорђе Стијеповић, Đorđe Stijepović, pronounced [d͜ʑô̞ːrd͜ʑe̞ stijě̞ːpo̞ʋit͜ɕ]) is a Serbian-American double bass player, singer and composer. He is best known as bassist for the psychobilly band Tiger Army and for Nickelodeon star Drake Bell. He is also a former member of Lemmy Kilmister's (Motörhead) side project The Head Cat (with Stray Cats' Slim Jim Phantom on drums).

As a bandleader, Stijepovic fronts the rockabilly band Atomic Sunset and performs as a solo artist under his own name. He has also recorded and performed as a guest musician with Tommy Emmanuel, Marco Beltrami, Wanda Jackson, Molotov, Rachel Brice and Beats Antique among others.

== Beginnings ==
Djordje Stijepovic grew up in a music family in Belgrade, Serbia. His mother was a music professor and his father was a professional folk dancer in Serbian National Ensemble Kolo. He decided to become a musician at 10 years old, after hearing Elvis Presley's and Stray Cats' records for the first time. At 11, he formed his first rock'n'roll band Lonesome Train. He started on guitar and switched to double bass when he was 13 years old. Stijepovic enrolled in a Classical music school only to convince his parents to buy him a double bass. He received a master's degree in double bass performance from the Music Conservatory in Belgrade, subsequently obtaining a degree in jazz bass and arrangements as well.

== Music career ==
=== 1995–2004: First bands in Serbia ===
At 18 years old, Djordje Stijepovic joined Balkan Music Club, one of the first world music bands in Serbia. As a member of this band, he is considered as one of the initiators of the world music scene in Serbia. Soon he developed an interest for Middle Eastern music as well, so he joined Shira Utfila in 2000. Shira Utfila received the RASA award as the best world music band in Europe. In 1999 he founded Marsya with Georges Grujic, a band dedicated to the traditional music of the Balkans. This band is considered a turning point for the Serbian world music scene.

That same year, he founded a 7-piece neo swing band Havana Whisper, the first band of this style in Eastern Europe. Their debut album Flammable was released in 2002 for PGP-RTS. Radio Television of Serbia filmed and broadcast a rockumentary of the same title about the band in 2002. When Stijepovic disbanded Havana Whisper in 2003, he formed the rockabilly trio Atomic Sunset. Occasionally he still performs with this band. With Atomic Sunset he released one album titled Hot Rods & Pin-Ups. Songs from this album are featured in the movie It's a Rockabilly World! from 2016.

During this period, he also played in a symphony orchestra for 7 years.

=== 2004–2006: Move to the US ===
Stijepovic moved to San Francisco in January 2004. At the beginning he mostly played with local bluegrass and rock'n'roll bands, including the Blue Note Cats.

In 2006 he joined Deke Dickerson and the Ecco-Fonics and started touring nationally. That same year, he played a concert with Joe Clay in Hollywood, and was noticed by Danny B. Harvey, who invited him to join him, Lemmy Kilmister and Slim Jim Phantom in the Head Cat.

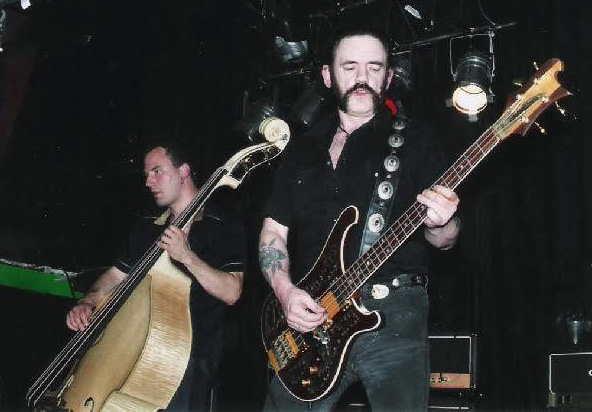
Stijepovic and Lemmy Kilmister during The Head Cat concert in Portland in 2007. Photo by Roger Neville-Neil.

=== 2007–2012: Head Cat, Fishtank Ensemble ===
Stijepovic spent most of 2007 touring with the Head Cat. They headlined Rockin' 1950's Fest III in Green Bay, Wisconsin. Footage from this show is included in the movie Lemmy, featuring Stijepovic as well. The band was joined by Guns N' Roses guitar player Slash at the 3rd Annual Sunset Strip Music Festival at the House of Blues in Hollywood.

In 2007 he also joined Fishtank Ensemble, an eclectic band that plays Gypsy music from all over the world (Balkan, Turkish, Flamenco ...) and hot jazz. Their music is featured in the movie Wild Target starring Emily Blunt, Bill Nighy and Rupert Everett. Fishtank Ensemble has something of a cult following, including celebrities like Tim Robbins and Sue Wong.

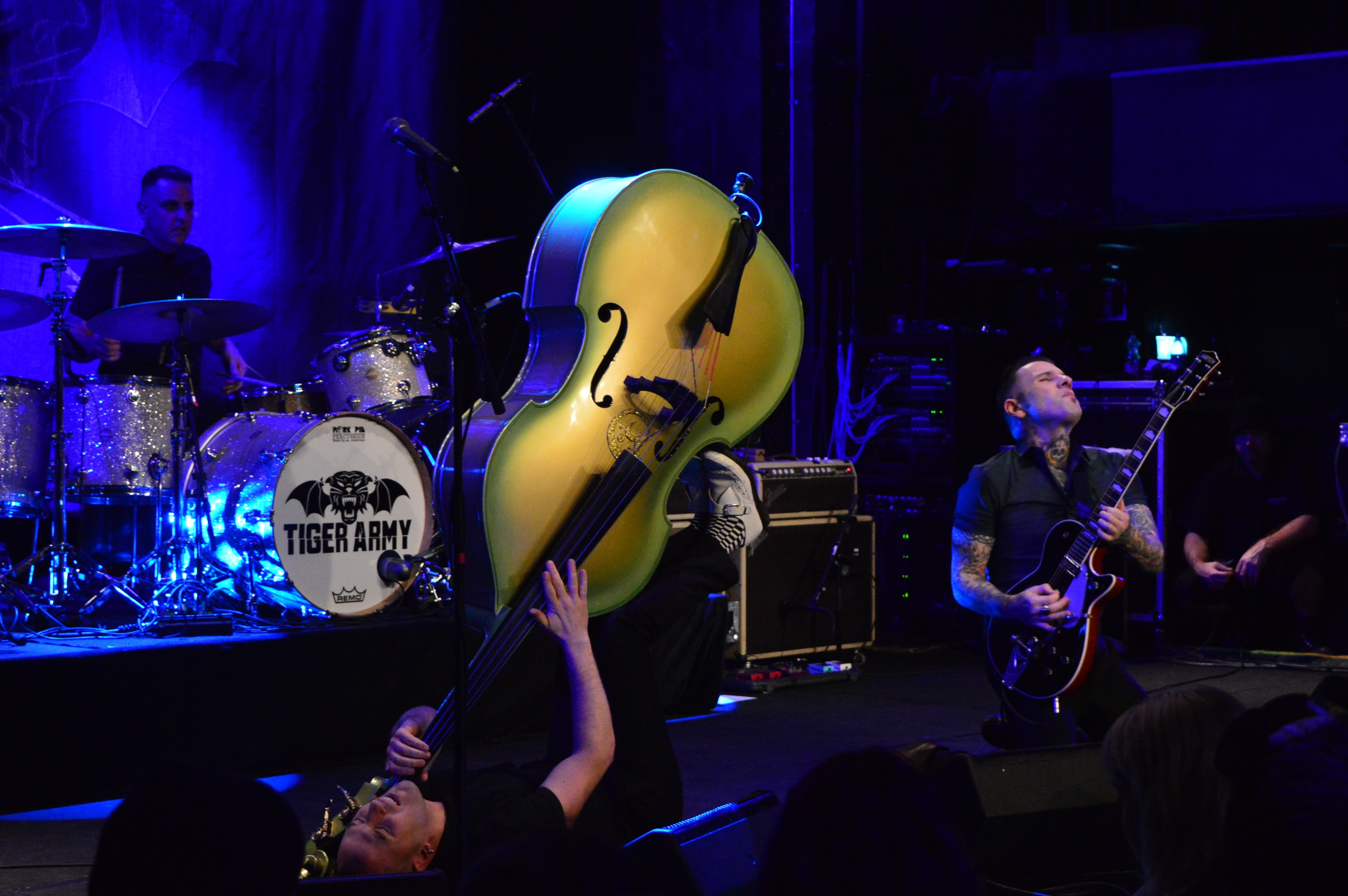
Stijepovic performing with Tiger Army in Gothenburg, Sweden, in 2016.

=== 2013–present: Drake Bell, Tiger Army, Molotov ===
In December 2013, Stijepovic received an invitation to play in Drake Bell's band as a guest at the Christmas concert of Brian Setzer Orchestra at the Dolby Theatre. Bell was thrilled by Stijepovic's musicianship and energy, so he became a steady member of the band. Their biggest show up to date was in front of 55.000 people at Foro Sol stadium in Mexico City in October 2014. In February 2020, Drake Bell released The Lost Album with Stijepovic playing double bass on songs "The Party" and "Pots & Pans".

In October 2015, Stijepovic became a member of the psychobilly band Tiger Army. Besides heavy touring in the US, Europe, Australia, South and Central America, the band played festivals like Riot Fest Chicago in 2016. They also appeared in two episodes of the late night show Last Call with Carson Daly. In 2018, they released the EP "Dark Paradise." Its title track, a cover of a Lana del Ray song, stayed on KROQ's TOP5 for 3 months and reached no.1 for 2 weeks in a row. To promote the EP, they've played 2 sold-out concerts at the Ace Hotel in Los Angeles. Full-length album Retrofuture was released on September 13, 2019, on Rise Records, followed by 2 music videos "Devil That You Don’t Know" and "Mi Amor La Luna". The Retrofuture tour concluded with 2 sold out nights at the Wiltern Theatre in Los Angeles. In January 2020, the Rock'n'Roll Hall of Fame updated their Right Here, Right Now exhibit, which focuses on current pop stars, with artifacts from Tiger Army, Taylor Swift, Billie Eilish, Adam Lambert, and Kacey Musgraves, which included Stijepovic's custom made shirt, shoes and bass strings.

In April 2018, Stijepovic joined the acoustic lineup of popular Mexican rap rock band Molotov. He was a special guest, alongside Ana Tijoux and Money Mark of the Beastie Boys, on their MTV Unplugged performance. The concert was filmed and recorded by Sylvia Massy and the album was nominated for the Latin Grammy Award for Best Rock Album in 2019. El Desconecte tour included 10 sold out nights at the Teatro Metropólitan in Mexico City.

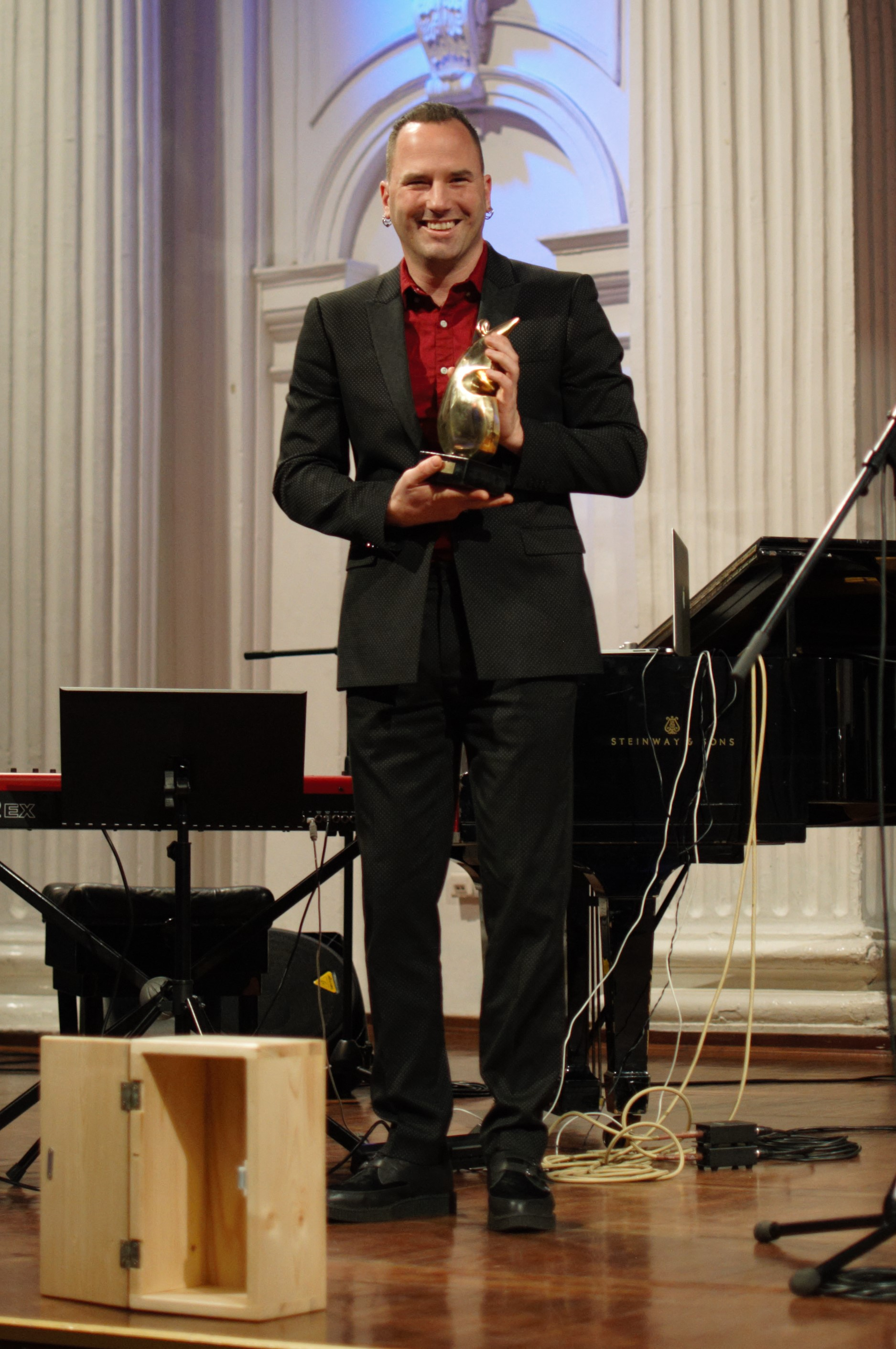
Djordje Stijepovic accepting an award for his contribution to World Music in 2019

=== Solo work ===
Djordje Stijepovic's solo work is greatly influenced by traditional jazz and world music, especially from the Balkans and the Middle East. He insists on perceiving music as a whole, with different genres just being a matter of taste. His original compositions are included on two compilations Srbija Sounds Global: All Stars and World Music from Serbia. Stijepovic regularly performs in duos with world's leading bellydancers of tribal fusion genre including Rachel Brice and Mira Betz.

In September 2015, Stijepovic's solo concert opened the first double bass festival Bass Passion in Serbia. His band included some of the best Serbian musicians: Aleksandar Sedlar on guitar, Vasil Hadzimanov on keyboard and Predrag Milutinovic on drums. On December 18, 2019, he was awarded the "Vojin Draskoci" statuette, for his contribution to the development of World music and played another solo show with the same band members.

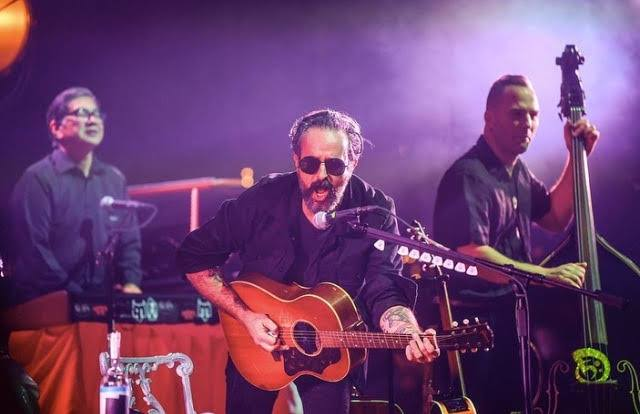
Money Mark (Beastie Boys), Tito Fuentes and Stijepovic during Molotov concert in Mexico City, in 2019.

=== Other collaborations ===
Djordje Stijepovic has performed and recorded with many world known musicians from very wide music genres. His session studio work includes Beats Antique (electronica), Tina Guo(Classical crossover), Rupa and the April Fishes (reggae), Kiosk (Persian), Marcelo (hip hop), Kal (Romani) and many others. Two albums he recorded with Kal reached top of World Music Charts Europe (Kal in 2006 and Radio Romanista in 2009).

Some other live collaborations include guitar virtuoso Tommy Emmanuel; rock'n'roll pioneers Donovan, Wanda Jackson, Dale Hawkins, Scotty Moore band, DJ Fontana, Sonny Burgess, Joe Clay, Eddie Bond, Gene Summers; blues giants Billy Boy Arnold, Jody Williams; jazz legend Don Randi; swing sensation Squirrel Nut Zippers; pop star Aaron Carter and many others. He also worked with movie composers Marco Beltrami and Danny Elfman.

=== Movies and theater ===
Stijepovic was a cast member in various theater plays like As You Like It (CalShakes, Orinda, CA), SummerSounds (Hollywood Bowl, Hollywood, CA) and Everyman (Atelje 212, Belgrade Serbia). He also appeared in movies Lemmy, It's a Rockabilly World! and Flammable.

== Playing style ==
Stijepovic is often referred as the world's best slap style double bass player. Slap bass is a mostly percussive technique that was developed in New Orleans at the beginning of the 20th century. He is writing the first book about the technique.

On several occasions he said he does not want to be pigeon-holed in any musical genre and that he sees music as a whole. His playing draws on many influences from different music styles like rockabilly, jazz, blues, country, Gypsy, punk, metal and classical.

At first, I tried to copy my favorite rockabilly licks, and then I gravitated deeper into the past researching old jazz, blues, country, and gypsy recordings. At the same time, I was listening to punk, metal, and studying classical music. I incorporate everything. I often use licks I learned from Romanian gypsy music when I play rockabilly, or throw in some New Orleans jazz licks when I play Balkan music. I do it all with a punk edge – my personal touch.

== Influences ==
Stijepovic most often cites Stray Cats, Clash, Motörhead, Tom Waits and Charlie Mingus as his main musical inspirations. As his slap bass influences, he lists Willie Dixon, Steve Brown, Joe Zinkan and Milt Hinton.

== Equipment ==
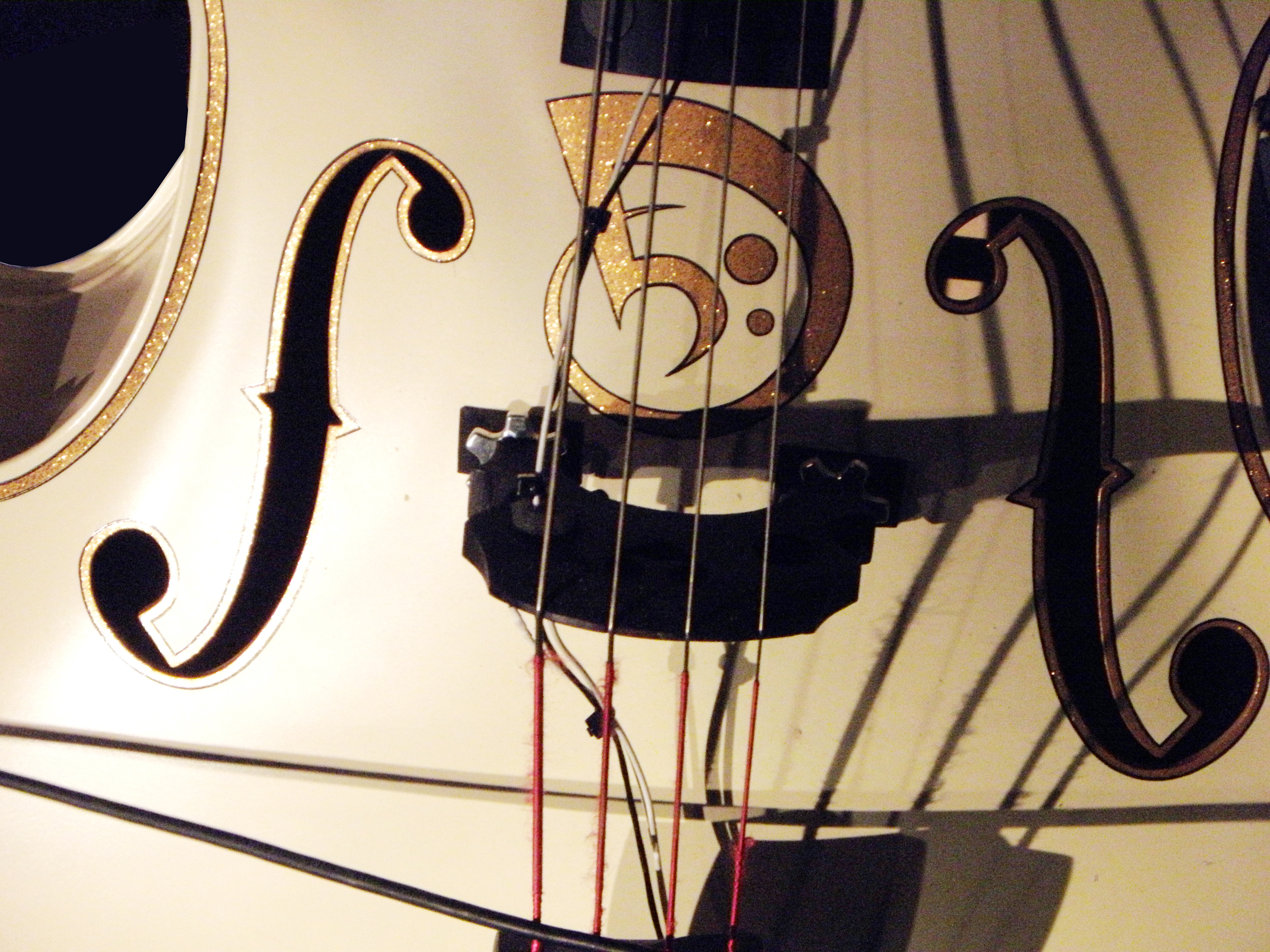
Stijepovic's logo is a stylized combination of Cyrillic letter Ђ and a bass clef.

Stijepovic is endorsed by Blast Cult, Thomastik-Infeld, Orange, Mogami, Mojave and CodaBow.

His main instrument since 2011 has been "The Great White", a custom double bass made under his specifications by the Blast Cult in Orange, CA. It has a one of a kind 3 pickup system. The symbol that can be seen under the strings is Stijepovic's logo, which is a stylized combination of the first letter of his name (Ђ – DJ in Cyrillic) and bass clef, made by the artist Zeljko Gajic. He has been using Thomastik-Infeld strings since he was a teenager and they made him their ambassador in 2006. He plays their Spirocore Orchestra Medium strings, Solo strings, and more recently their new prototype.

Stijepovic uses Orange amplifiers. On recent tours with Tiger Army he had 4 Stroke 500 with two OBC410 cabinets.

He also uses Mogami cables, Mojave microphones and CodaBow carbon fiber bows.

== Art of slap bass ==
Since 2002, Djordje Stijepovic has been intensively working on the development of slap bass technique, and researching its history. With the goal of its popularisation he started the web site www.artofslapbass.com on June 10, 2009. He publishes articles about slap bass on the web site and promotes other exponents of the style. He has interviewed legends like Marshall Lytle, Ray Campi, James Kirkland and discovered new players like Nicolas Dubouchet, Ryan Gould, Beau Sample and others.

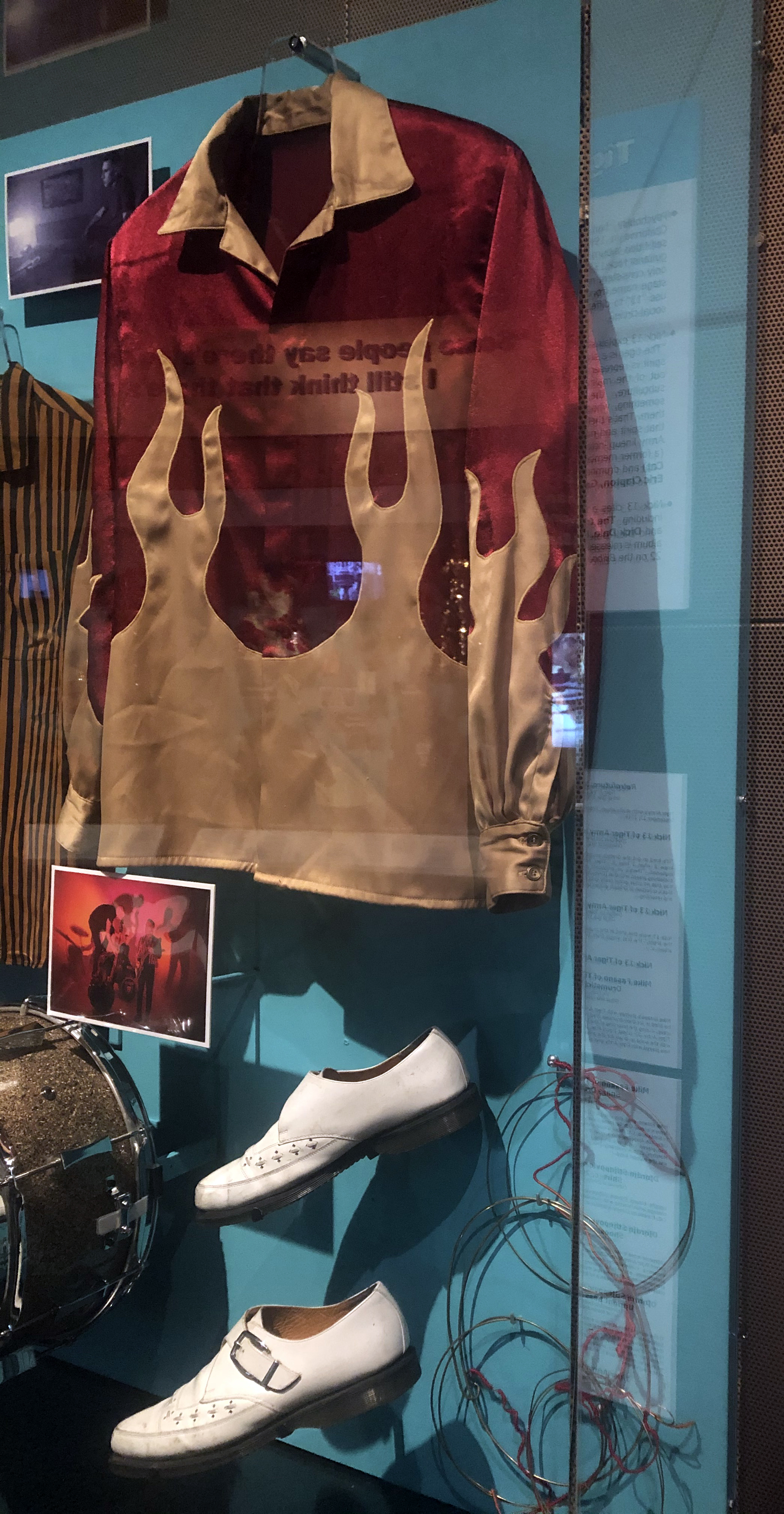
Stijepovic's shirt, shoes and strings on exhibit Right Here, Right Now at the Rock'nRoll Hall of Fame in Cleveland

== Awards and honors ==
- 2019 – Nominated for the Latin Grammy Award for best rock album El Desconecte with Molotov.
- 2019 – Received the annual award from World Music Association, for development and popularization of World music.
- 2020 – Rock'n'Roll Hall of Fame displays Stijepovic's shirt, shoes and strings as part of their Right Here, Right Now exhibit.

== Discography ==
Solo

- Everything I Ever Wanted (2024 Ceklin Music)
- Christine (2023 Ceklin Music)
- Hurtless (2022 Ceklin Music)
- World Music from Serbia (2009 WMAS Records)
- Srbija Sounds Global – All Stars (2008 B92)

With Tiger Army

- Retrofuture (2019 Rise Records)
- Dark Paradise (2018 Rise Records)

With Molotov

- MTV Unplugged: El Desconecte (2018 Universal Music)

With Drake Bell

- Non Stop Flight (2024 dB Records)
- The Lost Album (2020 dB Records)
- Bitchcraft (2018 Totsy)

With Fishtank Ensemble

- Edge of the World (2014 Fishtank Records)
- Ciocarlia/Ciganka sam mala (2010 Fishtank Records)
- Woman in Sin (2010 Fishtank Records)
- Live at Strings (2008 Estradasphere)
- Samurai Over Serbia (2007 Fishtank Records)

With Atomic Sunset

- Hot Rods & Pin-Ups (2007 Ceklin Music/Automatik Records)

With Shira Utfila

- Sephardic Songs from the Balkans (2008 Orange World Records)
- At thy Gates O Jerusalem (2003 PGP RTS)
- Nagila Alleluia (2001 self-released)

With Marsya

- A High Tree (2003 PGP RTS)

With Havana Whisper

- Flammable (2002 PGP RTS)

With Balkan Music Club

- Live in Belgrade 1999 (2008 WMAS Records)

With the Blue Note Cats

- Gone to TwangCity Bonafide The Trio Version (2020 Gretsch Kat Music)
- Rockabilly Rock N' Roll (2021 Gretsch Kat Music)

== Filmography ==
Year	Title	Notes
2024	DJORDJE - Everything I Ever Wanted	Music Video
2023	DJORDJE - Hurtless	Music Video
2020	Slapstream with Djordje	YouTube Series
2020	Tiger Army - Last Ride	Music Video
2019	Tiger Army – Devil That You Don't Know	Music Video
2019	Tiger Army – Mi Amor La Luna	Music Video
2019	Slap Bass Sunday	YouTube Series
2018	2018 MTV Unplugged with Molotov	Djordje played bass on Gimme tha Power, Marciano and Oleré y oleré y oleré el UHU"
2017	Tiger Army – Dark and Lonely Night	Music video
2017	Last Call with Carson Daly	Season 16, Episode 83: "Elisabeth Moss, Lauren Ash, Tiger Army"
2017	Last Call with Carson Daly	Season 16, Episode 64: "James Gunn, Halston Sage, Tiger Army"
2016	It's a Rockabilly World!	Documentary
2010	Lemmy	Documentary
2010	Fishtank Ensemble – Woman in Sin	Music video
2007	Atomic Sunset – Hot Rods & Pin-Ups	Music video
2002	Havana Whisper – Flammable	Television film
