= Over the Counter Culture (The Kings of Nuthin' album) =

Studio album by The Kings of Nuthin'
- Released: April 4, 2006
- Recorded: June 2005
- Studio: Outpost Studio, Stoughton, Massachusetts
- Genre: Punk rock; rockabilly; rhythm and blues
- Length: 29:26
- Label: Sailor's Grave Records
- Producer: Ronnie Cook

The Kings of Nuthin' chronology
Fight Songs for Fuck-Ups (2002)	Over the Counter Culture (2006)	Old Habits Die Hard (2010)

Over the Counter Culture by punk rock and rhythm & blues group The Kings of Nuthin' was recorded at Outpost Studio in Stoughton, Massachusetts, in June 2005 and was released on April 4, 2006, through Sailor's Grave Records.

== Release and reception ==
Professional ratings
Review scores
Source	Rating
Punknews.org	4/5 stars
laut.de	4/5 stars
Ox-Fanzine	9/10
Metalorgie.com	13/20
Metalfan.nl	78/100

On December 26, 2005, the album Punk Rock Rhythm & Blues was released on People Like You Records for the European market and appeared on the American market on April 4, 2006 under the name Over the Counter Culture on Sailor's Grave Records. It was recorded and mixed by Jim Siegel at Outpost Studio in Stoughton, Massachusetts.
According to laut.de, the European title "Punk Rock Rhythm & Blues" perfectly describes their style. According to Brackenridge's History of Psychobilly, this captures much more of their spirit than the American title. The Blueprint fanzine is more specific: "Half of the 14 tracks are extremely successful cover versions of late 70s and early 80s punk rock classics." "In addition, songs from the 50s in the rhythm & blues category are covered perfectly." The album has been described as a really fun and energetic mix of 50's rock & roll, swing and big band music channeled through vintage street punk influences and not lacking in serious songwriting. Ox-Fanzine sees Over the Counter Culture as a “strong record” that distinguishes itself from other punk rock releases with its “extraordinarily fresh mixture of (street) punk rock, rockabilly, rock'n'roll, swing and a pinch of old school hardcore”. The roughness comes close to the unpolished sound of the first Mighty Mighty Bosstones album. Torr Skoog's voice sounds like a Lemmy-influenced version of Slapshot singer Jack Kelly. In its conclusion, the magazine recognizes one of the most energetic records of the year. Razorcake compares the band with the Mighty Mighty Bosstones and with Hi-Fi and the Roadburners and they are described as one of the great and unusual bands from Boston whose performances are explosive. According to Plastic Bomb, they are breaking new ground and an 'Upstarter review even certified the Kings of Nuthin' as redefining an entire musical genre: "Much like their hometown brethren, The Mighty Mighty Bosstones, The Kings of Nuthin' have done for Rock and Roll what the aforementioned did for ska."

== Track listing ==
All tracks are written by Torr Skoog and Zack Brines, except where noted.

Over the Counter Culture track listing
No.	Title	Writer(s)	Original artist(s)	Length
1.	"Over the Counter Culture"			2:37
2.	"If I Were You"			1:47
3.	"For You"	Nick Culmer, Chris Exall	Anti-Nowhere League	2:22
4.	"Banned from the Pubs"	Derek Greening, Peter Bywaters	Peter and the Test Tube Babies	1:46
5.	"Only Time"			2:02
6.	"Quick Fix"			2:15
7.	"Women and Cadillacs"	James Starkes		2:21
8.	"Nation on Fire"	Carl Fisher, Charlie Howe, Neil McLennan, Nidge Miller	Blitz	2:13
9.	"Here We Are Nowhere"	Ali McMordie, Brian Faloon, Henry Cluney, Jake Burns	Stiff Little Fingers	0:50
10.	"Judge nor Jury"			2:05
11.	"No Brains"	Ashruf Radwan, Ian Woodcock	Eater	2:29
12.	"Tore Up"	John Henry Kendricks	Hank Ballard and the Midnighters	2:07
13.	"You Don't Think"			1:50
14.	"I Smell a Rat"	Jerome Leiber, Michael Stoller	Big Mama Thornton | Young Jessie	3:08

== Personnel ==
Musicians

- Torr Skoog – lead vocals
- Zack Brines – piano
- Liam Crill – drums
- Chris Wilkinson – washboard
- Hayden Cummings – tenor saxophone
- Trafton Waldrop – electric guitar
- Thomas Lorioux – upright bass
- Jon Natchez – baritone saxophone

Technical

- Dave Schultz – mastering engineer
- Jim Siegel – mixer, recording engineer
- John Cohan – drum technician

Artwork and design

- Amy Archer – cover photo, photography
- Angela Smith – photography, artwork
