= Earl Peterson =

American country musician (1927–1971)

- Born: Earl N. Peterson; February 24, 1927; Paxton, Illinois, U.S.
- Died: May 29, 1971 (aged 44) Greenville, Michigan, U.S.
- Genres: Country, rockabilly
- Occupations: Musician, radio host
- Instruments: Guitar, vocals, drums
- Years active: 1940s–1950s
- Labels: Nugget, Sun, Columbia

Earl N. Peterson (February 24, 1927 – May 29, 1971) was an American country and rockabilly musician and radio host. He is best known for his 1954 recording "Boogie Blues", released on Sun Records.

== Early life ==
Peterson was born in Paxton, Illinois. His family moved to Michigan during his early childhood, where he was raised. He developed an interest in music at an early age and performed locally as a teenager.

He began his career in radio, hosting programs in the Midwest, including on station WOAP in Owosso, Michigan.

== Career ==
Peterson briefly studied law before pursuing music professionally. In the early 1950s, he performed with his group, the Sons of the Golden West, and became known through regional radio broadcasts.

He released his first single, "Michigan Waltz / Take Me Back to Michigan", on the Nugget label, which he operated with his mother.

Earl Peterson was referred to as "Michigan's Singing Cowboy" due to his strong regional radio presence.

In 1954, Peterson recorded "Boogie Blues" for Sun Records. His work is associated with the early rockabilly style.

He later recorded for Columbia Records, but his commercial recording career was relatively brief.

Despite limited national success, Peterson maintained popularity as a regional performer and radio personality.

== Later life and death ==
Peterson lived primarily in Michigan and later resided in Greenville. In 1965, he was diagnosed with cancer. He continued working in radio until his death on May 29, 1971, at the age of 44.

His recording "Boogie Blues" was later featured in the 2005 biographical film Walk the Line, about Johnny Cash.

== Discography ==
Year	Title	Label
1950	The Michigan Waltz / Take Me Back to Michigan	Nugget
1954	Boogie Blues / In the Dark	Sun
1955	Boogie Blues / Believe Me	Columbia
1955	I'm Not Buying, Baby / Be Careful of the Heart You're Going to Break	Columbia
1955	I Ain't Gonna Fall in Love / I'll Live My Life Alone	Columbia
1956	World of Make Believe / You Gotta Be My Baby	Columbia
