= Suburban Voice =

- 24th issue cover, 1988.
- Editor: Al Quint
- Staff writers: Al Quint; et al.
- Categories: Music magazine
- Publisher: Al Quint
- Founder: Al Quint
- Founded: 1982
- Final issue Number: 2003; 46
- Country: United States
- Based in: Swampscott, Massachusetts
- Language: English
- Website: subvox.blogspot.com

Suburban Voice is a punk zine published by Al Quint. Started in 1982, it was originally titled Suburban Punk for the first 10 issues. Although the zine has other contributors, Quint is its primary writer. The zine is noted for its in-depth interviews and detailed music reviews. The print version ended with issue #46, in 2003. Since then, it has been an online blog.
