= Samurai Over Serbia =

Studio album by Fishtank Ensemble
- Released: 2007
- Recorded: The Lair Recording Studios
- Genre: Eastern European
- Length: 58:40
- Producer: Douglas Smolens

Fishtank Ensemble chronology
Super Raoul (2005)	Samurai Over Serbia (2007)

Samurai Over Serbia is the second full-length album by Fishtank Ensemble. It was independently released by the band in 2007. Traditional eastern European, gypsy jazz, klezmer and original tunes are arranged to fit the ensemble's unconventional, but imaginative sound. The groups sound is "consistently captivating, as if Gypsy swing continued to swirl around the world, picking up new inflections at every turn."

== Track listing ==
1. "Saraiman" (traditional, arr. F. Martinez) – 4:09
2. "Turkish March" (W.A. Mozart, arr. A. Seeman) – 2:59
3. "Tchavo" (traditional, arr. F. Martinez) – 4:30
4. "Face the Dragon" (music & arr. by F. Martinez) – 4:06
5. "Gitanos Californeros" (D. Smolens, arr. Paco de Lucia) – 5:38
6. "Spirit Prison" (music by D. Smolens, K. Kmetz, lyrics by U. Knudson) – 3:58
7. "Fraima" (Cesare & GianCarlo dell'Anna, arr. F. Martinez) – 3:45
8. "Youkali" (Kurt Weill) – 4:52
9. "Ezraoul" (arr. F. Martinez) – 2:55
10. "Mehum Mato" (traditional, arr. F. Martinez) – 7:16
11. "Samurai Over Serbia" (traditional, arr. F. Martinez) – 7:33
12. "Extremely Large Congenial Romanian" (music and arr. A Seeman) – 2:23
13. "Yasaburpo Bush" (traditional, arr. M. Penny) – 4:43

== Personnel ==
- Fabrice Martinez - violin, violomba
- Ursula Knudson - vocals, violin, musical saw, banjolele, percussion
- Douglas Smolens (el Douje) - guitar
- Aaron Seeman (Duckmandu) - accordion
- Djordje Stijepovic - upright bass on tracks 1, 2, 4, 9, 11
- Andy Zacharias - upright bass on tracks 3, 5–8, 10, 12
- Mike Penny - Tsugaru shamisen, guitar
- Kevin Kmetz - additional shamisen tracks on track 4, guitar tracks on track 12
