= Hi-Fi and the Roadburners =

American rock band

Hi Fi and the Roadburners
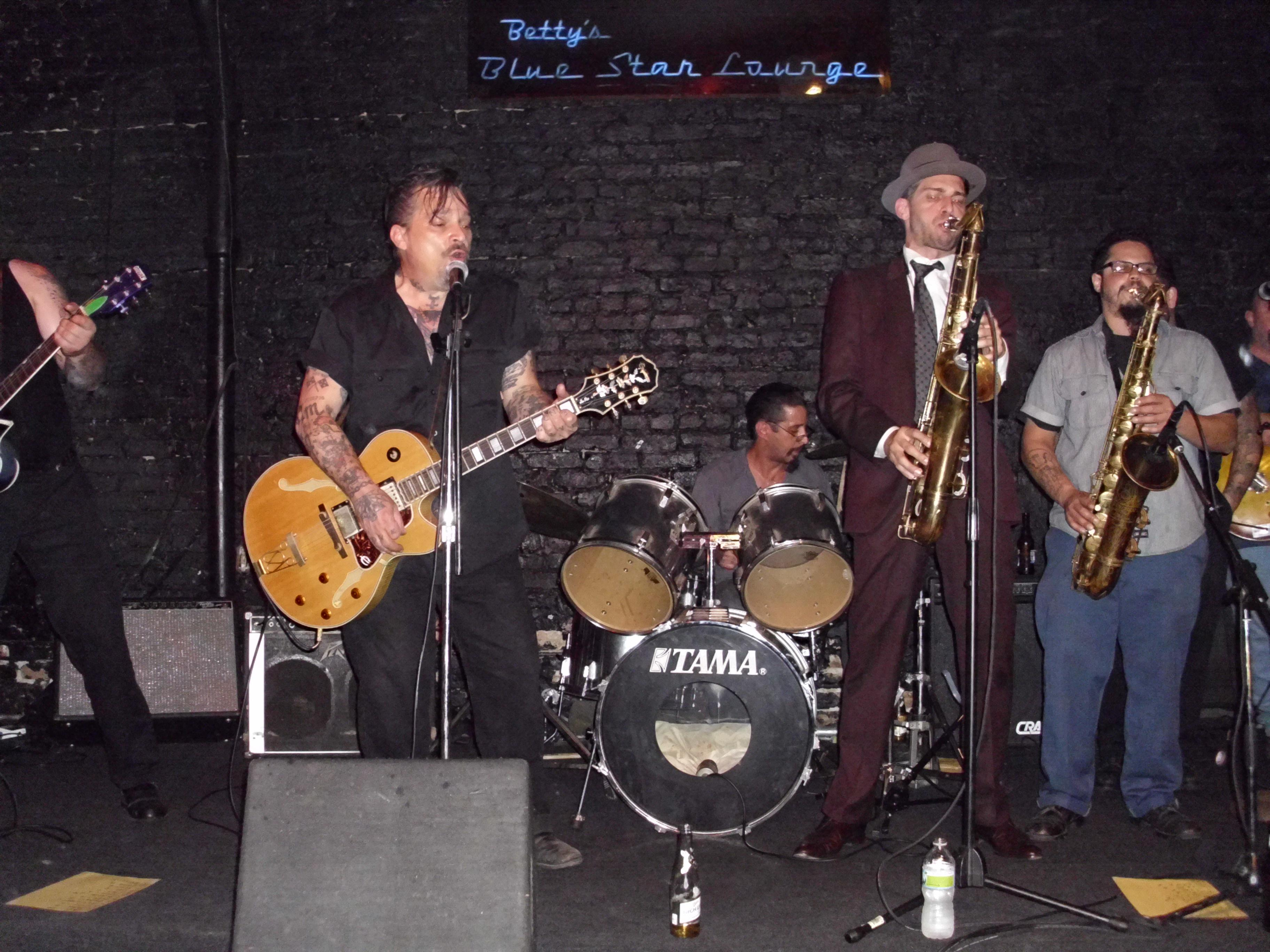

Background information
- Origin: Chicago, Illinois
- Genres: Rockabilly
- Years active: 1984–2011
- Label: Victory Records
- Members: Erik Kish, Hans Kish, Brett Keen, Brian Lueck, Tony Bryan, Denis McQuinn, Aaron Getsug

Hi Fi and the Roadburners were a rock band from Chicago whose music has been described as "rockabilly infused with punk" and "bebop and boogie-woogie". They formed in 1984 and have had many line-up changes, with the Kish brothers, Erik and Hans, being the only constant members. They signed with Victory Records in 1993.

Erik "Hi Fi" Kish also owned and operated Fear City Choppers with his brother Hans and Billy Favata on Chicago's Northside. Fear City Choppers' main focus is personalizing custom Harley Davidson and Triumph motorcycles. Fear City Choppers' motorcycles have been featured in the Horse Backstreet Choppers magazine.

On Thursday September 29, 2011, frontman Erik "Hi Fi" Kish died after a motorcycle accident the previous evening.

== Band members ==
Lead vocals, rhythm guitar

- Erik "Hi-fi" Kish (died: 09–29–2011)

Bass guitar, backing vocals

- Hans Kish (died: 07–10–2023)

Lead guitar

- Brett "Machetti" Keen
- Ed Wille
- Jeff Schuch (died: 12–28–2009)
- Randy Dell
- Bill Bulinski
- Bill Harden ("Rockin' Billy")
- Willie Blackwell (died: 07–27–2010)
- Ron Cannon ("Big Daddy Sun") (died: 03–15–2013)
- Carl Schrieber
- Mike Berquist (died: Fall 1995)
- Jerry Nelson
- Sam Barker

Drums

- Brian Lueck
- Dan Curry
- Steve Uppling
- Randy Dell
- Daniel Aranda
- Bob Morris ("Monster Bob")
- Rick P. Fiore

Saxophone

- Tony Bryan
- Denis McQuinn
- Aaron "Gigs" Getsug
- Craig McWilliams
- "Texas" Eddie Reed (Ed Petitti)

Keyboards

- Dan Stieger
- Ken Takata
- Big Bill
- Matt Parmenter

== Discography ==
"Be Bop Boogie+Petty Crime"

- Format: 7" Vinyl 45 RPM
- Tracks: "Bring It Up High", "Riot In Cell Block No. 9", "That's Your Daddy Yaddy Yo", "Georgia Slop"

self-titled

- Released: 1990
- Format: CD
- Label: Delta Recordings
- Producer: Ron Cannon (a.k.a. "Big Daddy Sun")
- Tracks: "I Saw The Wolfman", "When I First Met You", "Bye Bye Baby", "Burnin'", "Dirty Lovin'", "Chi-Town Hustler", "Bring It Up High", "Blues In The Mornin'", "You Don't Know Nothin'", "Cadillac Car"

"Demons of Wicker Park"

- Released: 1993
- Format: 7" Vinyl 45 RPM
- Label: Victory Records
- Tracks: "Hurricane", "Rocket To Mars"

"Demons of Wicker Park"

- Released: 1993
- Format: CD
- Label: Victory Records
- Tracks: "Hurricane", "Brain Pain", "Rocket To Mars", "Hard Drivin'"

"Fear City"

- Released: 1994
- Format: CD
- Label: Victory Records
- Tracks: "Mary Ann", "Devil In Disguise", "Minister's Daughter", "Dead Bug", "F.T.W." (Fare Thee Well), "Fear City", "Bad Times", "Mexican Whore", "Big Red", "Be Bop And Boogie", "Something Bad", "Outlaw Blues"

"Wine, Women and Sin"

- Released: 1996
- Format: CD
- Label: Victory Records
- Tracks: "Knock 'Em Down", "What The Hell", "Chi-Town Hustler", "Run Johnny Run", "Hellride", "Strange Things", "Ain't That A Shame", "Fuck Off", "Bring It Up High", "Come Out Swingin'", "Get Up And Go", "Break The Walls", "Get Outta My Way"

"Live In Fear City"

- Released: 1997
- Format: CD
- Label: Victory Records
- Tracks: "Chicago Greasers On A Rampage", "Marianne", "Hurricane", "Strange Things", "Dead Bug", "What The Hell", "Get Up And Go", "Something Bad", "Rocket To Mars", "Fear City"

"Flat Iron Years"

- Released: 1998
- Format: CD
- Label: Victory Records
- Tracks: "Craw Fishin'", "Riot In Cell Block No. 9", "I Saw The Wolfman", "Chicken Shack Boogie", "Dirty Lovin'", "I'm Ready", "Cadillac Car", "That's Your Daddy Yaddy Yo", "Burnin'", "You Don't Know Nothin'", "Whatcha Gonna Do", "When I First Met You", "I'm A Hog", "Blues In The Mornin'", "Georgia Slop", "Witchcraft", "Love Bandit", "Bye Bye Baby", "Let's Have A Ball", "Lights Out"

== Reception ==
- "Chicago's Hi-Fi and the Roadburners kicked off the evening with engineer boots and pomade to spare, not to mention enough inked skin to line the walls of a tattoo parlor. Their basic guitar-and-screaming sax attack was a lunge at postwar guitar rock with all the subtlety of a lug wrench, a gruff intro for headliner Reverend Horton Heat's more polished renderings." (Chauncey Hollingsworth, Chicago Tribune, 1997)
- "Greasers with flaming tattoos and Pabst Blue Ribbon beer for cologne never go out of style, right? Well, not if they can burn the rubber with some high-test rock 'n' roll. And Chicago's Hi Fi and the Roadburners can scorch the blacktop with the best of 'em." (Michael Dunn, Tampa Tribune, 1997)
- "Hailing from Chicago, the rockabilly revival quintet Hi-Fi & the Roadburners is comprised of members Erik Kish (vocals, rhythm guitar), Hans Kish (bass, backing vocals), Jeff Schuch (lead guitar and backing vocals), Brian Lueck (drums), and Dennis McQuinn (sax, backing vocals). The group issued several albums on the Victory label during the '90s, including such titles as 1994's Fear City, 1996's Wine, Women, and Sin, 1997's Live in Fear City, and the 1998 compilation Flat Iron Years." (Greg Prato, Allmusic)
- "The Chicagobred greased down dressed up Roadburners do plain and simple American rock 'n roll that's driven by a burning horn section." (San Antonio Express-News)
- "The Roadburners do on-the-mark, grease-fueled, American rock 'n roll. Utilizing a basic 44 backbeat and lead licks from saxophone, guitar and piano, the band delivers originals and cool covers of tunes such as "Crawfish" and "Chicken Shack Boogie"" (Jim Beal, San Antonio Express-News, 1999)
