= Cigar Store Indians =

American rockabilly band

Cigar Store Indians are an American rockabilly band from Crabapple, Georgia, United States.

The band formed in the summer of 1991 when singer/songwriter Ben Friedman moved back home from a year and a half stint playing in NYC. He met through a creative loafing ad lead guitar player Jimmy "Lownote" Lavender and they began working together on a vintage sound. Both musicians shared a love for the 1950s blues/country sound (called rockabilly music). Ben's childhood friend, drummer Frances "Fast Pedal" Farran was enlisted to play the drums. Many nights were spent practicing in "Fast Pedal" Farran's shed. Friend and guitarist Rob Fickling was asked to switch to bass guitar and the first incarnation of CSI was born.

In 1995, after developing a large fan base in and around Atlanta, Georgia, the band was offered their first recording contract on Landslide Records. It featured Lavender on lead guitar, new member Keith Perissi on Bass, Farran on drums, and Friedman on guitar and vocals. The record was produced and engineered by Rodney Mills and recorded in Atlanta at Triclops studio. Constant touring and memorable songs landed the self-titled first release to #3 on the Gavin Americana Charts. Highlights included an extended tour with the Squirrel Nut Zippers.

The band made a switch to drummer David "Pup" Roberts for their second release, El Baile de la Cobra, which was recorded for the North Carolina label, Deep South Records. Tom Maxwell and Kenny Mosher who are members of the band Squirrel Nut Zippers added horns on a few of the tracks and Rodney Mills again produced and engineered the record. The album quickly rose to #10 on the Gavin Americana Charts.

The third recording, Guestlist, was a live recording for the Atlanta-based, Overall Records and gave listeners a chance to sit in on a CSI live set from Smith's Olde Bar and Eddies Attic, both local Atlanta music mainstay clubs. It featured a new drummer, Paul Barrie, who had previously been with Atlanta band, Donkey, Jim "Lownote" Lavender on lead guitar and vocals, Keith Perissi on bass guitar and vocals, and Ben Friedman on lead vocals and guitar. This lineup toured extensively in the United States and Europe.

Their last album, Built of Stone, was recorded by Jeff Bakos at his Amp Works Studio and was mastered by Rodney Mills; it was released on Overall Records. It featured Paul Barrie on drums, Keith Perissi on bass guitar, Friedman on guitar and vocals, and Jeff Sprayberry on lead guitar.

In 2025, original band members ( Paul Barrie, Keith Perissi, Jimmy Lownote Lavender and Ben Friedman ) reformed to play the Waterfest concert series in Oshkosh WI and Smiths Ole Bar in Atlanta GA.

== Band members ==
The following includes a listing of current and past members:

Name	Role
Rob Fickling	Bass, Vocals
Stuart Sanders	Bass
Jimmy "Lownote" Lavender	Lead Guitar, Vocals
Frances "Fast Pedal" Farran	Drums
Ken Rosenburg	Drums
David "Pup" Roberts	Drums
Jeff Sprayberry	Guitar, Vocals
Keith Perissi	Bass Guitar, Vocals
Paul Barrie	Drums, Vocals
Micah Cadwell	Guitar, Vocals
Todd Kerstetter	Upright Bass, Vocals
Charlie Blevins	Drums, Vocals
Ben Friedman	Lead Vocal, Acoustic Guitar
