= The Shods =

American punk rock band

- Origin: Lowell, Massachusetts, United States
- Genres: Rock n Roll, Punk rock, power pop
- Years active: 1993–present
- Labels: Poorhouse Records, Lunch Records, Killing Floor Records
- Members: Kevin Stevenson; Scott Pittman; Dave Livingston; Dave Aaronoff; Jay Buckley
- Past members: Roy Costa; F.J. Ventre; James Gaudette; Eric Stevenson; Craig Silverman; Micah Blue Smaldone; Carl Ayotte; Travis Taylor
- Website: theshods.net

The Shods are a band from Lowell, Massachusetts who have released five albums and an EP to date. The Shods have a loyal regional following, and remain well known in their home state.

== Origins ==
The Shods formed in 1993 in Lowell, MA with musicians Scott Pittman, Roy Costa, and music mainstay Kevin Stevenson, whose other projects included Formicide, Only Living Witness, and Duck Duck. Within a week of forming, the band produced a debut EP titled I'm in Lowell, MA. In 1995, the band released its debut full-length album Here Come The Shods on a self-created label called Poorhouse Records.

== Tours ==
After recruiting F.J. Ventre on Bass, and Dave Aaronoff on second guitar, work began at Fort Apache Studios on what was intended to be their major label release on MCA. This deal, however, fell through and the band shelved the project until 2001. Also during this time, the band toured around the northeast with fellow Bostonians, The Mighty Mighty Bosstones, and Stevenson began playing in what became known as the Rivers Cuomo Band.

== Health issues ==
After many lineup changes during the recording of Bamboozled and Thanks for Nuthin', The Shods were threatened to come to an end when lead guitarist/vocalist/songwriter Kevin Stevenson learned he was battling multiple sclerosis. Following the tragic news, the band pushed forward by releasing Tippy in 2003. Although activity has been mostly stagnant in recent years, past members have returned with founders Kevin Stevenson and Scott Pittman for reunion shows including one in support the Mighty Mighty Bosstones and Dropkick Murphys in 2007.

== Albums ==
- I'm in Lowell, MA - EP
- Here Come The Shods
- Bamboozled, Jilted, Hornswoggled + Hoodwinked
- Thanks For Nuthin'
- Stop Crying
- Tippy
