= Joe Clay =

American musician

- Born: Claiborne Joseph Cheramie; September 9, 1938; Harvey, Louisiana, U.S.
- Origin: Gretna, Louisiana, U.S.
- Died: September 26, 2016 (aged 78)
- Genre: Rockabilly
- Instruments: Drums; guitar; bass guitar
- Label: Vik Records

Claiborne Joseph Cheramie (September 9, 1938 – September 26, 2016), better known by his stage name Joe Clay, was an American rockabilly musician. He was from Gretna, Louisiana, United States.

== Career ==
Clay was born in Harvey, Louisiana, United States. His parents encouraged an early interest in country music and at the age of 12, he was already a competent drummer, later also learning rhythm guitar and electric bass. Clay began performing at that age in a country band, who were offered a spot performing on the local radio station WWEZ. RCA subsidiary Vik Records signed him a few years later, while he was still in his teens; he recorded in New York with guitarists Mickey Baker and Skeeter Best, bassist Leonard Gaskin, and drummers Bobby Donaldson and Joe Marshall. He drove a school bus for 15 years in the New Orleans area. "During 1955 his local reputation enabled him to play the prestigious Louisiana Hayride out of Shreveport where he shared billing with the newly emerging Elvis Presley." The source also mentioned he filled in as a drummer for Presley when he played Pontchartrain Amusement Park in New Orleans, when D.J. Fontana could not make the gig.

In 1956, he appeared on The Ed Sullivan Show, a few months before Elvis Presley performed thereon, and Clay played a cover of The Platters' hit "Only You (And You Alone)", after Sullivan had stopped Clay's pre-transmission rehearsal of "Ducktails" to say he didn't want that on his show. Clay would later play guitar on some of Presley's recordings, but his manager would not let him tour outside the New Orleans area, and he never scored a hit.

After being dropped from RCA, he continued performing in New Orleans for over 30 years. In the 1980s, the rockabilly revival in Europe resulted in renewed interest in Clay; he then toured England in 1986.

In 1991, Clay was interviewed and featured in Cat Tales fanzine, appearing on the cover. He talked about his early success, fading into obscurity, then being rediscovered.

In 2008, he appeared in an award-winning Canadian documentary entitled Rockabilly 514, directed by Patricia Chica and Mike Wafer. He spoke about his early beginnings as a rockabilly musician in the 1950s and his fascination for the new generation of rockabilly followers. He is also seen performing live his single, "Sixteen Chicks", among an enthusiastic crowd of young rockabilly fans.

In 2011, Clay in performance at the NOLA House Of Blues, was inducted into the Louisiana Music Hall Of Fame.

Clay headlined The Rockers Reunion in the Rivermeade Leisure Centre, Reading, England on January 23, 2016.

Clay died on September 26, 2016, at the age of 78.

== Discography ==
Year	Title	Record label
1956	"Duck Tail" / "Sixteen Chicks"	Vik Records
1956	"Get On The Right Track" / "Cracker Jack"	Vik Records
1962	"Can’t Get You Out Of My Mind" / "Don’t Know What To Do"	Samter Records
1963	"Love You" / "My Heart Loves Only You"	Samter Records
1963	"I Get So Blue" / "Little Darlin'"	Samter Records
N/K	"Did You Mean Jelly Beans (When You Said Cabbage Head)"; "Doggone It"; "Goodbye, Goodbye"; "Slipping Out And Sneaking In"; "You Look That Good To Me"; "Get on the Right Track"	
