= Animal Collective discography =

American experimental pop group discography

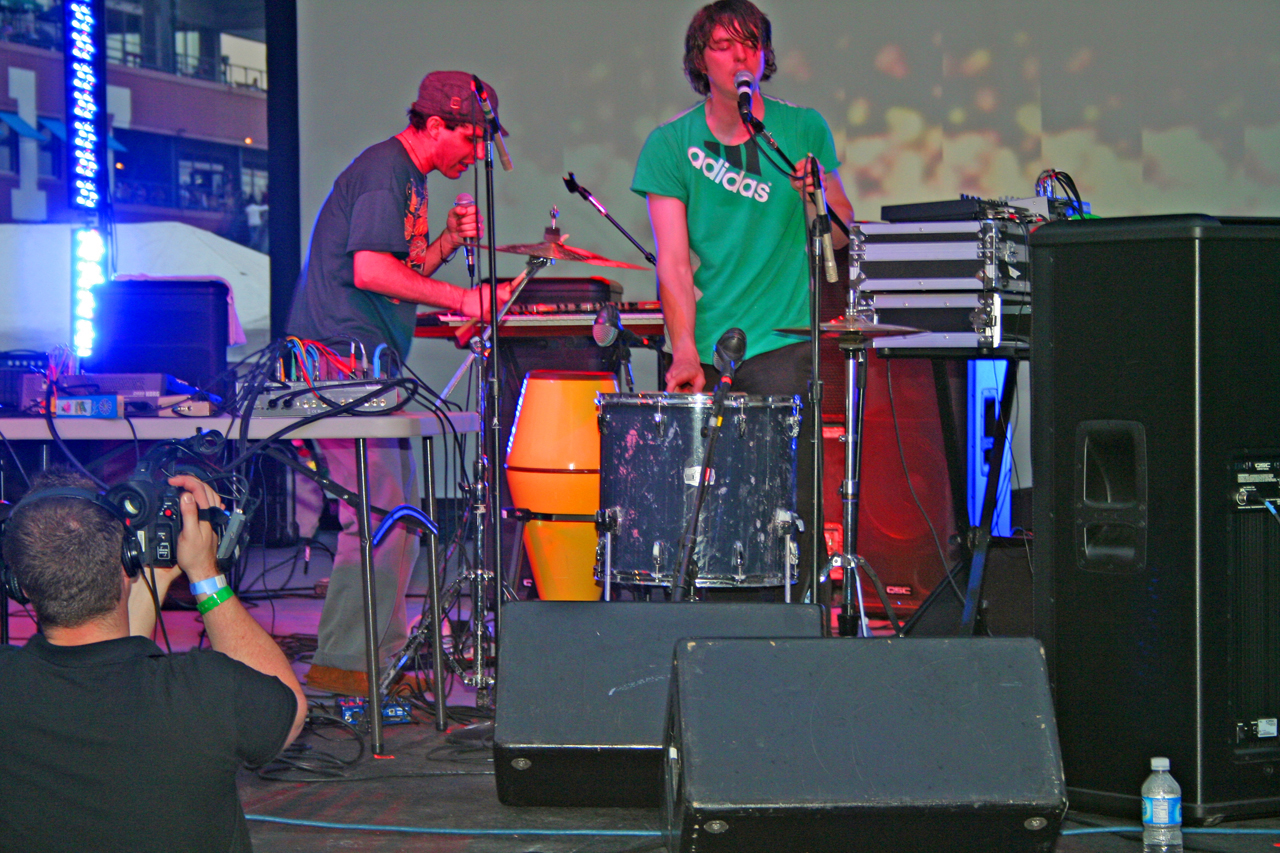
- Animal Collective performing at the Seaport Music Festival at South Street Seaport, New York City, on June 1, 2007.
- Studio albums: 12
- Extended plays: 12
- Live albums: 5
- Singles: 19
- Video albums: 2

The discography of Animal Collective, an American experimental pop group, consists of 12 studio albums, 4 live albums, 2 video albums ("visual album"), 12 EPs and 19 singles.

The group consists of musicians Avey Tare (David Portner), Panda Bear (Noah Lennox), Deakin (Josh Dibb), and Geologist (Brian Weitz). They run the record label Paw Tracks, on which they have released much of their own material.

== Albums ==
=== Studio albums ===
List of albums, with selected chart positions and certifications
Title	Album details	Peak chart positions										Sales	Certifications
Title	Album details	US	AUS	BEL	CAN	FRA	NLD	NOR	SCO	SWE	UK	Sales	Certifications
Spirit They're Gone, Spirit They've Vanished (as Avey Tare and Panda Bear)	Released: August 2000; Label: Animal, FatCat; Formats: CD, LP	—	—	—	—	—	—	—	—	—	—		
Danse Manatee (as Avey Tare, Panda Bear and Geologist)	Released: July 2001; Label: Catsup Plate, FatCat; Formats: CD, LP	—	—	—	—	—	—	—	—	—	—		
Campfire Songs (as Campfire Songs)	Released: March 2003; Label: Catsup Plate, Paw Tracks; Formats: CD	—	—	—	—	—	—	—	—	—	—		
Here Comes the Indian (also known as Ark)	Released: June 17, 2003; Label: Paw Tracks; Formats: CD, LP	—	—	—	—	—	—	—	—	—	—		
Sung Tongs	Released: May 3, 2004; Label: FatCat; Formats: CD, LP	—	—	—	—	—	—	—	—	—	—	US: 27,000	
Feels	Released: October 18, 2005; Label: FatCat; Formats: CD, LP	—	—	—	—	—	—	—	—	—	—	US: 55,000	
Strawberry Jam	Released: September 10, 2007; Label: Domino; Formats: CD, LP, digital download	72	—	—	—	102	—	—	—	—	132	US: 84,000	
Merriweather Post Pavilion	Released: January 6, 2009; Label: Domino; Formats: CD, LP, digital download	13	63	31	25	46	58	21	29	37	26	US: 199,000	BPI: Silver
Centipede Hz	Released: September 4, 2012; Label: Domino; Formats: CD, LP, digital download	16	75	32	—	66	68	34	52	38	55	US: 47,000	
Painting With	Released: February 19, 2016; Label: Domino; Formats: CD, LP, digital download	46	100	87	—	147	—	—	39	—	42		
Time Skiffs	Released: February 4, 2022; Label: Domino; Formats: CD, LP, digital download	152	—	—	—	—	—	—	42	—	— (Note: Time Skiffs did not enter the UK Albums Chart, but peaked at number 35 on the UK Albums Sales Chart.)		
Isn't It Now?	Released: September 29, 2023; Label: Domino; Formats: CD, LP, digital download	—	—	—	—	—	—	—	—	—	— (Note: Isn't It Now? did not enter the UK Albums Chart, but peaked at number 48 on the UK Albums Sales Chart.)		
"—" denotes a recording that did not chart or was not released in that territory.

=== Live albums ===
List of live albums
Title	Album details
Hollinndagain (as Avey Tare, Panda Bear and Geologist)	Released: 2002; Label: St. Ives; Formats: LP (Limited)
Animal Crack Box	Released: May 11, 2009; Label: Catsup Plate; Formats: LP (Limited)
Live at 9:30	Released: September 4, 2015; Label: Domino; Formats: Digital, LP (Limited)
Live at Fonda Theatre March 9, 2016	Released: May 9, 2016; Label: Self released; Formats: Digital
Live at The Ritz April 13, 2016	Released: May 9, 2016; Label: Self released; Formats: Digital
Live at College Street Music Hall May 26, 2017	Released: December 21, 2017; Label: Self released; Formats: Digital
Ballet Slippers	Released: November 22, 2019; Label: Domino; Formats: Digital, 3×LP
2 Nights	Released: June 12, 2020; Label: Domino; Formats: Digital
Live at Music Box Village	Released: December 23, 2021; Label: Self released; Formats: Digital
Sung Tongs Live at the Theatre at Ace Hotel	Released: October 4, 2024; Label: Domino; Formats: Digital, 2xLP
FEELSLive 04/05	Released: October 17, 2025; Label: Domino; Formats: Digital, MiniDisk, Cassette

=== Video albums ===
List of video albums, with selected chart positions
Title	Album details	Peak chart positions	
Title	Album details	US Video	UK Indie
Oddsac	Released: August 10, 2010; Label: Plexifilm, Swiss Dots; Formats: DVD	8	—
Tangerine Reef	Released: August 17, 2018; Label: Domino; Formats: CD, LP, digital download	—	42

=== Soundtrack albums ===
List of soundtrack albums
Title	Album details
Crestone (Original Score)	Released: February 16, 2021; Label: Domino Recording Company; Formats: LP, digital download
The Inspection (Original Motion Picture Soundtrack)	Released: November 18, 2022; Label: A24 Records; Formats: Digital download
Jetty (Original Motion Picture Soundtrack)	Released: November 17, 2025; Label: Domino Recording Company; Formats: Digital download

== EPs ==
List of EPs, with selected chart positions
Title	Details	Peak chart positions					
Title	Details	US Sales	US Dance Sales	US Rock	FRA	UK DL	UK Indie
Prospect Hummer (with Vashti Bunyan)	Released: May 24, 2005; Label: FatCat; Formats: CD	—	—	—	—	—	—
People^{[A]}	Released: October 23, 2006; Label: FatCat; Formats: CD, 7", 12"	39	—	—	—	—	—
Water Curses^{[A]}	Released: May 6, 2008; Label: Domino; Formats: CD, 12", digital download	1	1	—	—	—	—
Fall Be Kind	Released: November 23, 2009; Label: Domino; Formats: CD, 12", digital download	—	—	45	50	—	23
Keep + Animal Collective	Released: March 26, 2011; Formats: Cassette	—	—	—	—	—	—
Transverse Temporal Gyrus^{[B]}	Released: April 21, 2012; Label: Domino; Formats: 12", digital download	—	—	—	—	—	—
Monkey Been to Burn Town	Released: May 27, 2013; Label: Domino; Formats: 12", digital download	—	—	—	—	—	—
New Psycho Actives Vol. 1 (as Avey Tare and Geologist)	Released: March 21, 2015; Label: Self released; Formats: digital download	—	—	—	—	—	—
The Painters	Released: February 17, 2017; Label: Domino; Formats: 12", digital download	—	—	—	—	—	—
Meeting of the Waters	Released: April 22, 2017; Label: Domino; Formats: 12", digital download	—	—	—	—	—	—
New Psycho Actives Vol. 2 (as Avey Tare and Geologist)	Released: August 20, 2019; Label: Self released; Formats: digital download	—	—	—	—	—	—
Bridge to Quiet	Released: July 3, 2020; Label: Domino; Formats: 12", digital download	—	—	—	—	69	—
"—" denotes a recording that did not chart or was not released in that territory.

== Singles ==
List of singles, with selected chart positions, showing year released and album name
Title	Year	Peak chart positions						Certifications	Album
Title	Year	US Sales	US Dance Sales	FRA	MEX Air.	UK Phys.	UK Indie	Certifications	Album
"Wastered" (with Black Dice)	2004	—	—	—	—	—	—		Non-album single
"Who Could Win a Rabbit"	2004	—	—	—	—	—	—		Sung Tongs
"Grass"	2005	—	—	—	—	—	—		Feels
"The Purple Bottle"	2006	—	—	—	—	—	—		Feels
"Peacebone"	2007	7	1	—	—	—	32		Strawberry Jam
"Fireworks"	2007	—	—	—	—	—	41		Strawberry Jam
"My Girls"	2009	—	—	—	—	—	—	RIAA: Gold	Merriweather Post Pavilion
"Summertime Clothes"	2009	8	1	—	20	74	—		Merriweather Post Pavilion
"Brother Sport"	2009	—	—	96	—	58	—		Merriweather Post Pavilion
"Honeycomb / Gotham"	2012	8	—	—	—	2	—		Non-album single
"Today's Supernatural"	2012	—	—	—	45	—	—		Centipede Hz
"Applesauce"	2012	17	—	—	35	19	—		Centipede Hz
"FloriDada"	2015	—	—	—	48	—	—		Painting With
"Lying in the Grass"	2016	—	—	—	—	—	—		Painting With
"Golden Gal"	2016	—	—	—	—	—	—		Painting With
"Gnip Gnop / Hounds of Bairro"	2016	—	—	—	—	—	—		Non-album singles
"Mountain Game"	2016	—	—	—	—	—	—		Non-album singles
"Prester John"	2021	—	—	—	—	—	—		Time Skiffs
"Walker"	2021	—	—	—	—	—	—		Time Skiffs
"Strung with Everything"	2022	—	—	—	—	—	—		Time Skiffs
"We Go Back"	2022	—	—	—	—	—	—		Time Skiffs
"Defeat"	2023	—	—	—	—	12	—		Isn't It Now?
"Love On The Big Screen"	2025	—	—	—	—	24	—		Non-album single
"—" denotes a recording that did not chart or was not released in that territory.

== Remixes ==
List of remix work for other artists
Title	Year	Original artist
"Mirando" (Animal Collective Remix)	2008	Ratatat
"Little Bird" (Animal Collective Remix)	2008	Goldfrapp
"Zero" (Animal Collective Remix)	2009	Yeah Yeah Yeahs
"Love Like A Sunset" (Animal Collective Remix - Deakin's Jam)	2009	Phoenix
"Welt Am Draht" (Animal Collective Version)	2011	Pantha Du Prince
"Decadence" (Animal Collective Remix)	2012	Heavenstamp
"I Want You" (Animal Collective Remix)	2015	Beat Spacek
"Go!" (Animal Collective/Deakin Remix)	2016	M83
"Drift of Drummer" (Animal Collective Remix)	2026	Guedra Guedra

== Notes ==
- A Despite being extended plays as opposed to singles, People and Water Curses charted on Billboard singles charts, rather than albums charts.
- B Transverse Temporal Gyrus is a record featuring music created individually by all four members of the band and made into a sound collage in two parts. It was released as a part of Record Store Day and was limited to 5,000 copies.
