= Animal Crack Box =

Live album by Animal Collective
- Released: May 11, 2009
- Recorded: 2000–2003
- Length: 95:24
- Label: Catsup Plate

Animal Collective chronology
Merriweather Post Pavilion (2009)	Animal Crack Box (2009)	Fall Be Kind (2009)

Professional ratings
Review scores
Source	Rating
Pitchfork	7.5/10

Animal Crack Box is a live box set by American experimental music act Animal Collective. It was released in limited quantities on May 11, 2009, by Catsup Plate Records.

== Background ==
After being discussed for years before its actual production, this vinyl-only box set finally received its promised treatment. On 18 March 2009 Catsup released the track listing and cover art. A test pressing was offered on eBay to benefit Doctors Without Borders. The commercial version, a single vinyl-only edition of 1000 copies, was made available for purchase on May 11, 2009, via Fusetron.

Printed by VGKids in Ypsilanti, MI during the early months of 2009.

== Track listing ==
Side A
No.	Title	Also on	Length
1.	"Jimmy Raven"	Danse Manatee (as "The Living Toys")	7:22
2.	"Ahhh Good Country"	Danse Manatee	5:09
3.	"Iko Ovo"		5:26

Notes
A1 and A2 recorded live to MiniDisc 18 September 2000 at the Cooler, NYC by Avey/Panda.
A3 recorded live to MiniDisc fall 2000 at N. 4th Practice Space, Brooklyn by Avey/Panda.

Side B
No.	Title	Also on	Length
1.	"Pumpkin Gets a Snakebite"	Hollinndagain	4:11
2.	"Pumpkin's Hallucination"		3:50
3.	"Pumpkin's Funeral"		4:19

Notes
B1 and B3 recorded live to MiniDisc February 2001 at N. 4th Practice Space, Brooklyn by Avey/Panda/Geologist.
B2 recorded live to MiniDisc 25 February 2001 at Mercury Lounge, NYC by Avey/Panda/Geologist.

Side C
No.	Title	Also on	Length
1.	"Jungle Heat"		3:28
2.	"Hey Friend"		3:31
3.	"De Soto De Son"	Campfire Songs	8:42

Notes

C1 and C2 recorded live to MiniDisc winter early 2001 at 67 Atlantic Ave, Brooklyn by Avey/Panda.

C3 recorded live to MiniDisc 13 August 2000 at Mercury Lounge, NYC by Avey/Panda.

Side D
No.	Title	Also on	Length
1.	"Oh Sweet"		7:25
2.	"Young Prayer #2"	Young Prayer	2:59
3.	"Do the Nurse"		5:38

Notes

D1 partly recorded live to MiniDisc summer 2002 at N. 4th Practice Space, Brooklyn by Avey/Deakin and partly recorded live to MiniDisc 18 October 2002 at Warsaw, Brooklyn by Avey.
D2 recorded live to MiniDisc fall 2002 at Bard College, NYC by Avey/Panda.

D3 recorded live to MiniDisc 18 October 2002 at Warsaw, Brooklyn by Avey.

Side E
No.	Title	Also on	Length
1.	"Ice Cream Factory"		6:23
2.	"Hey Light"	Here Comes the Indian	2:35
3.	"Two Sails"	Here Comes the Indian	6:37

Notes
E1 and E3 recorded live to MiniDisc March 2002 at Tonic, NYC by Avey/Panda/Geologist/Deakin.
E2 recorded live to MiniDisc winter early 2002 at N. 4th Practice Space, Brooklyn by Avey/Panda/Geologist/Deakin.

Side F
No.	Title	Also on	Length
1.	"Don't Believe the Pilot"		3:43
2.	"Who Could Win a Rabbit"	Sung Tongs	3:07
3.	"Mouth Wooed Her"	Sung Tongs	4:23
4.	"Covered in Frogs"		3:28
5.	"We Tigers"	Sung Tongs	3:08

Notes
F1 and F2 recorded live to MiniDisc July 2003 at New World Brewery, Tampa, Florida by Avey/Panda.
F3 recorded live to MiniDisc June 2003 at a house party in Brooklyn by Avey/Panda.
F4 recorded live to MiniDisc sometime and somewhere in 2003 (recording details are lost) by Avey/Panda.
F5 recorded live to MiniDisc October 2003 at Concorde 2, Brighton, UK by Avey/Panda.

== Personnel ==
- Avey Tare
- Panda Bear
- Geologist
- Deakin
