= Live at 9:30 (album) =

Live album by Animal Collective
- Released: September 4, 2015
- Recorded: June 12, 2013
- Venue: 9:30 Club (Washington, D.C.)
- Length: 116:01
- Label: Domino

Animal Collective chronology
Monkey Been to Burn Town (2013)	Live at 9:30 (2015)	Painting With (2016)

Live at 9:30 is the third live album by Baltimore-based band Animal Collective. It was released in 2015 on Domino. The album is a recording of the band's performance at the 9:30 Club in Washington, D.C., on June 12, 2013. All the songs performed appear on the band's previously released LPs and EPs. The show's opening act was fellow Baltimore musician Dan Deacon, who does not appear on the recording.

== Track listing ==
No.	Title	Original album	Length
1.	"Amanita"	Centipede Hz	9:53
2.	"Did You See the Words"	Feels	7:12
3.	"Honeycomb"	"Honeycomb" / "Gotham"	4:27
4.	"My Girls"	Merriweather Post Pavilion	7:15
5.	"Moonjock"	Centipede Hz	6:10
6.	"New Town Burnout"	Centipede Hz	11:08
7.	"I Think I Can"	Fall Be Kind	8:12
8.	"Pulleys"	Centipede Hz	15:10
9.	"What Would I Want? Sky"	Fall Be Kind	8:10
10.	"Peacebone"	Strawberry Jam	8:54
11.	"Monkey Riches"	Centipede Hz	8:23
12.	"Brother Sport"	Merriweather Post Pavilion	11:01
13.	"The Purple Bottle"	Feels	10:06
Total length:			116:01
