= Geologist (disambiguation) =

Geologist may refer to:

- Geologist, a contributor to the science of geology
- Geologist (musician), a member of Animal Collective
