= Tangerine Reef =

Video by Animal Collective
- Released: August 17, 2018
- Genre: Ambient; psychedelia; avant-pop
- Length: 52:45 (music); 54:28 (film)
- Label: Domino

Animal Collective chronology
Meeting of the Waters (2017)	Tangerine Reef (2018)	Bridge to Quiet (2020)

Tangerine Reef is the second visual album by American experimental pop band Animal Collective, released on August 17, 2018, through Domino. It is the band's first full-length release without Panda Bear, and was made in collaboration with art-science duo Coral Morphologic and in celebration of the International Year of the Reef. It was the band’s first visual album since 2010’s ODDSAC. The album is accompanied by a film, which premiered on the band's website upon release.

== Background and recording ==
Tangerine Reef is the product of longtime collaborations between Animal Collective and Coral Morphologic, an art-science duo consisting of marine biologist Colin Foord and musician J.D. McKay. The two groups first met in 2010 at a screening of Animal Collective's ODDSAC, when Coral Morphologic gave Deakin a DVD consisting of their work. The members of Animal Collective were impressed by the footage and reached out, leading to several collaborations, such as Geologist soundtracking Coral Morphologic's 2011 short film Man o War, and Foord providing spoken word on Avey Tare's solo album Eucalyptus. The two groups have also gone scuba diving together.

The genesis of Tangerine Reef came in February 2017 at an art exhibition called "Coral Orgy", hosted at New World Center in Miami, where Animal Collective performed over video projections made by Coral Morphologic. Material from Tangerine Reef was also played live in May 2018 during a performance at David Lynch's Festival of Disruption in Brooklyn. The band recorded the initial performance with the intent of releasing it as a live album, but found the recording "unusable" due to crowd noise. Rather than abandon the project, the band got together at a Baltimore studio run in part by Deakin and "took a few days and did four or five run-throughs of the Miami set." To recapture the feel of the original performance, the album was recorded live and with no overdubs. The recording was then sent to Coral Morphologic to provide the video component. Animal Collective thought it could simply be paired with the video they originally performed to, but Coral Morphologic felt they needed to re-shoot parts of it.

The album features the standard lineup of the band with the exception of Panda Bear, the band's first full-length release to do so. Panda Bear also did not feature in the live performances of the music. His absence is due to distance, as he lives in Portugal.

The project commemorates the 2018 International Year of the Reef, and is intended to draw public attention to the issue of coral reef conservation. According to Geologist, the band hopes that "Animal Collective fans and beyond will see this footage and be inspired to care about the ocean and care about coral reefs and do what they can." For Foord, "the point is to introduce corals into pop culture", with the aim of speaking to people who would otherwise not have interest in corals.

The band cited the experimental film Koyaanisqatsi as an influence on the album. The work of filmmaker Jean Painlevé, and the documentary film Powers of Ten, were named by Foord as inspirations for the filmmakers.

== Release ==
Animal Collective announced Tangerine Reef on July 16, 2018, alongside a pre-order of the album and the release of the first single "Hair Cutter", which was accompanied by a music video released exclusively on Apple Music and directed by John McSwain and Coral Morphologic. The album's accompanying film premiered on the band's website on the same day of its release on August 17, 2018.

== Critical reception ==
Professional ratings
Aggregate scores
Source	Rating
AnyDecentMusic?	5.6/10
Metacritic	60/100
Review scores
Source	Rating
AllMusic	3.5/5 stars
The A.V. Club	C−
Drowned in Sound	7/10
Exclaim!	6/10
The Independent	2/5 stars
NME	1/5 stars
The Observer	2/5 stars
Pitchfork	6.9/10
PopMatters	8/10
Q	3/5 stars

At Metacritic, which assigns a normalized rating out of 100 to reviews from mainstream critics, Tangerine Reef received an average score of 60, based on 18 reviews, indicating "generally favorable reviews". Alex Hudson from Exclaim! gave the album a mixed review, saying, "For fans of Animal Collective's trippier inclinations, Tangerine Reef is a pleasant bit of oceanic escapism. For new listeners or anyone looking for the next "My Girls," this is decidedly inessential." Erik Adams of The A.V. Club wrote, "The record captures all the noodling self-indulgence that makes the psych-poppers such a maddeningly inconsistent live act. But Tangerine Reef is an incomplete object in this form: It's accompaniment, not feature presentation, the drowsy soundtrack to the iridescent undersea visuals of Australian filmmakers Coral Morphologic."

PopMatters critic Chris Ingalls stated, "Tangerine Reef is a project that may likely polarize Animal Collective fans, and it may not be an ideal jumping-off point for anyone looking to discover this unique band, but it's a worthy addition to their catalog, and it supports a supremely important cause in this day and age." Pitchfork's Sasha Geffen wrote, "Without Panda Bear on board, Animal Collective lose the pop edge that has resulted in their most commercially successful music, but this isn't a project for scoring hits. It's a meditative, hypnotic experience, and it's not without the sense of playfulness that has driven Animal Collective throughout their career." Emily Mackay of The Observer criticized the album, saying "AC plumb depths of paucity more than subtlety in this wilfully desolate expanse of dispassionate vocals and vague, awkward ambience."

== Track listing ==
No.	Title	Length
1.	"Hair Cutter"	4:01
2.	"Buffalo Tomato"	4:49
3.	"Inspector Gadget"	4:19
4.	"Buxom"	4:40
5.	"Coral Understanding"	3:44
6.	"Airpipe (to a New Transition)"	6:03
7.	"Jake and Me"	4:25
8.	"Coral by Numbers"	2:27
9.	"Hip Sponge"	3:52
10.	"Coral Realization"	3:00
11.	"Lundsten Coral"	3:05
12.	"Palythoa"	4:11
13.	"Best of Times (Worst of All)"	4:09
Total length:		52:45

== Personnel ==
- Avey Tare
- Deakin
- Geologist

== Charts ==
Chart (2018)	Peak position
US Independent Albums (Billboard)	14
US Vinyl Albums (Billboard)	5

== Release history ==
Region	Date	Label	Format	Ref.
Various	August 17, 2018	Domino	CD; 2×LP; digital download	
