= Prospect Hummer =

EP by Animal Collective featuring Vashti Bunyan
- Released: May 24, 2005
- Studios: Idle Luxury Studios (London, UK)
- Genres: Experimental folk; freak folk; psychedelic rock
- Length: 15:41
- Label: FatCat

Animal Collective chronology
Sung Tongs (2004)	Prospect Hummer (2005)	Feels (2005)

Prospect Hummer is an EP by Animal Collective released in May 2005. It is an accompaniment to Sung Tongs.

On a Europe tour in the middle of 2004, the group was introduced to the British folk singer Vashti Bunyan in Edinburgh, Scotland, by Kieran Hebden (Four Tet). Bunyan finally contributed vocals to all of the songs except for "Baleen Sample". Avey Tare, Panda Bear and Deakin are present throughout the entire EP; Geologist, who could not join the tour because of his dayjob, is featured only on the song "Baleen Sample". They had three days to record three songs.

The first two songs are outtakes from the Sung Tongs recording sessions, re-recorded with Bunyan.

Bunyan says about the recordings:

My daughter says she can hear me smiling on the title track [...] and I was. I loved having the freedom to sing as I wanted. I was still finding my voice after burying it for years.

The release in 2005 led to a Fat Cat Records signing for Vashti Bunyan, who finally wrote, recorded and released her second album Lookaftering, ending a thirty-year hiatus.

== Critical reception ==
Professional ratings
Review scores
Source	Rating
AllMusic	3/5 stars
No Ripcord	8/10
Pitchfork	8.4/10
PopMatters	5/10
Prefix Magazine	8.0/10
Sputnikmusic	4.0/5
Tiny Mix Tapes	3.5/5 marks

Prospect Hummer was welcomed with general warmth from music reviewers.

For No Ripcord, Ben Bollig applauded it as a "luscious and simple ... EP that showcases the best of both artists."

== Track listing ==
No.	Title	Length
1.	"It's You"	3:40
2.	"Prospect Hummer"	4:40
3.	"Baleen Sample"	5:05
4.	"I Remember Learning How to Dive"	2:16
Total length:		15:41

== Personnel ==
=== Musicians ===
- Vashti Bunyan - vocals (1–2, 4)

Animal Collective

- Avey Tare - guitar, piano, vocals (1–4)
- Deakin - guitar, vocals (1–4)
- Geologist - sampler (on "Baleen Sample")
- Panda Bear - guitar, vocals (1–2, 4)

=== Technical ===
- Anthony Whiting - recording, production
- Rusty Santos - mastering, mixing, recording
