= Isn't It Now? =

Studio album by Animal Collective
- Released: September 29, 2023
- Recorded: 29 November 2021– 12 October 2022
- Studios: Bunker Studio (Brooklyn, New York)
- Genres: Experimental rock; neo-psychedeila
- Length: 64:12
- Label: Domino
- Producers: Animal Collective; Russell Elevado

Animal Collective chronology
| Time Skiffs (2022) | Isn't It Now? (2023) |

Singles from Isn't It Now?
- 1. "Defeat" Released: June 26, 2023; 2. "Soul Capturer" Released: July 26, 2023; 3. "Gem & I" Released: September 13, 2023

Isn't It Now? is the twelfth studio album by the American neo-psychedelic band Animal Collective. It was released on September 29, 2023, on Domino. With a runtime of slightly over 64 minutes, it is their longest studio album to date. It was largely developed during the same 2019 writing sessions that produced their 2022 album Time Skiffs, but by contrast with that album's pandemic-era remote recordings, it was recorded in person.

== Background and recording ==
While the album was co-produced and mixed by Russell Elevado in the winter of 2021, it was written and developed in the summer of 2019 at a cabin in Leiper's Fork, Tennessee, alongside the material for their 2022 album Time Skiffs. The group chose the material for Time Skiffs from that set of songs based on what would be easier to record remotely during the COVID-19 pandemic, while Isn't It Now? would feature material that relied more on a live dynamic and improvisation. The album was recorded over the course of 12 days in late 2021 at the Bunker in Brooklyn, and mastered by Heba Kadry.

Alongside songs that would appear on Time Skiffs, all of the tracks except for "All the Clubs Are Broken" were performed regularly on the group's 2022 tour, with some having debuted in 2018 at a New Orleans show ("Magicians from Baltimore", "Defeat") and during the Sung Tongs Tour ("Genie's Open").

The releases of Time Skiffs and Isn't It Now? mark the first time since 2004's Sung Tongs and 2005's Feels that the group has released albums one year after another. It is also the first time since Feels and 2007's Strawberry Jam, and the second overall, that the group has released two consecutive albums as a quartet.

== Release ==
In the week before the release of the first single "Defeat", certain customers of Domino Records began receiving 12" vinyl records with no information other than a partially-colored label depicting a stylized pair of eyes. On June 26, 2023, the group released "Defeat" as the then-unannounced album's lead single, both digitally and on a 12" vinyl record.

The album itself was first teased through a cryptic website sharing the album's name, with fans on the Animal Collective mailing list also receiving a postcard with the album title on it similar to the one shown on the cover. The album's artwork and track listing were released by the band through the website and their Instagram page on July 24, 2023, and it was formally announced two days later on July 26. The second single, "Soul Capturer", was released along with a music video on the same day.

The album was released on limited edition orchid and tangerine colored vinyl, standard black vinyl, CD, and digitally.

== Critical reception ==
Professional ratings
Aggregate scores
| Source | Rating |
|---|---|
| AnyDecentMusic? | 7.3/10 |
| Metacritic | 77/100 |
Review scores
| Source | Rating |
| AllMusic | 4/5 stars |
| The Arts Desk | 3/5 stars |
| Beats per Minute | 83% |
| Clash | 8/10 |
| Exclaim! | 8/10 |
| The Line of Best Fit | 8/10 |
| Mojo | 3/5 stars |
| MusicOMH | 4/5 stars |
| Pitchfork | 8.0/10 |
| Uncut | 9/10 |

Isn't It Now? received a score of 77 out of 100 on review aggregator Metacritic based on fifteen critics' reviews, indicating "generally favorable" reception. After the release of the second single "Soul Capturer", Paste described it as "a five-minute soundscape that weaves in and out of various shapes, harmonies, patterns and drones", and called the single "one of the brightest Animal Collective compositions in recent memory." The Fader considered it a "characteristically circuitous affair" with "all the hallmarks of an AnCo classic".

Relix gave the album a positive review, concluding that it "feels concise and cohesive, offering a seamless blend of anxiety and beauty, nostalgia and progress, sadness and hope." Flaunt magazine was also favorable, stating that the album "strives past a solely auditory experience, creating a space of internal and communal reflection." Uncut called it "even better" than Time Skiffs on account of being "consistently inventive rather than merely quirky" and "mak[ing] sincere effort to get to the emotional core of what they do". Pitchfork's Andy Cush wrote that the band "explore some surprisingly traditional psych-rock modes, but without abandoning their essential trickster spirit".

== Track listing ==
All tracks are written by Animal Collective, except where noted.

Isn't It Now? track listing
| No. | Title | Lead vocals | Length |
|---|---|---|---|
| 1. | "Soul Capturer" | Avey Tare | 6:08 |
| 2. | "Genie's Open" | Panda Bear/Avey Tare | 7:53 |
| 3. | "Broke Zodiac" | Panda Bear | 2:45 |
| 4. | "Magicians from Baltimore" | Avey Tare | 9:27 |
| 5. | "Defeat" | Avey Tare/Panda Bear | 21:58 |
| 6. | "Gem & I" | Panda Bear | 3:39 |
| 7. | "Stride Rite" | Deakin | 4:53 |
| 8. | "All the Clubs Are Broken" | Avey Tare | 2:16 |
| 9. | "King's Walk" | Avey Tare/Panda Bear/Deakin | 5:10 |
| Total length: | | | 64:12 |

Digital edition bonus track
| No. | Title | Length |
|---|---|---|
| 10. | "Soul Capturer" (single version) | 5:44 |
| Total length: | | 69:56 |

== Personnel ==
Animal Collective

- Avey Tare – vocals (all tracks), bass (2–9), electric guitar (1), synthesizers (1, 5), piano (2)
- Deakin – vocals (1, 2, 4–9), bass (1), acoustic guitar (1), synthesizers (2–6, 8), celeste (2, 5), electric piano (3), piano (4, 7)
- Geologist – hurdy-gurdy (1–3, 5, 9), synthesizers (1–8), samples (2–9), acoustic guitar (2), gong (5), percussion (7)
- Panda Bear – vocals (all tracks), drums (1–8), electric guitar (1), percussion (1)

Additional personnel

- Russell Elevado – producing and mixing
- Heba Kadry – mastering
- Sara Schoenbeck – bassoon (2)
- Samara Lubelski – violin (5)
- Leila Bordreuil – cello (5)
- Ben Chapoteau-Katz – tenor saxophone (5)

Artwork and design

- Avey Tare – collages
- Rob Carmichael (SEEN Studio) – layout

== Charts ==
Chart performance for Isn't It Now?
| Chart (2023) | Peak position |
|---|---|
| UK Album Downloads (Official Charts) | 66 |
| UK Independent Albums (Official Charts) | 23 |
