= Keep + Animal Collective =

EP by Animal Collective
- Released: March 26, 2011
- Length: 12:39
- Label: Keep

Animal Collective chronology
| Oddsac (2010) | Keep + Animal Collective (2011) | Transverse Temporal Gyrus (2012) |

Keep + Animal Collective is the sixth EP by experimental pop band Animal Collective, released on March 26, 2011 on cassette. Bundled with a range of shoes designed by the band, Keep + Animal Collective contains one solo song from each member of the group.

The EP was released in limited quantities and was only sold in a bundle with the Keep + Animal Collective shoes on a first-come, first-served basis.

"The Preakness" was later included on the deluxe edition of Tomboy, and an alternate version was included on the Crosswords EP.

== Tracklisting ==
| No. | Title | Writer(s) | Length |
|---|---|---|---|
| 1. | "Jailhouse" | Geologist | 2:16 |
| 2. | "Call Home (Buy Grapes)" | Avey Tare | 3:13 |
| 3. | "Country Report" | Deakin | 3:29 |
| 4. | "The Preakness" | Panda Bear | 3:36 |
| Total length: | | | 12:39 |
