= Sleep Cycle =

Studio album by Deakin
- Released: April 6, 2016
- Recorded: 2009–15
- Length: 33:28
- Labels: My Animal Home, Domino

Singles from Sleep Cycle
- 1. "Just Am" Released: April 6, 2016

Sleep Cycle is the debut solo studio album by Animal Collective member Deakin (Josh Dibb), released on Bandcamp on April 6, 2016. That same day, "Just Am" was the first track shared from the album, accompanied by a music video. The album was subsequently released on My Animal Home on April 8, 2016. It was remastered and reissued by Domino in 2019.

== Background ==
Dibb originally started raising funds for Sleep Cycle through a Kickstarter campaign in 2009. Dibb intended to use the funds to perform at the Festival au Désert in Mali, Africa, the creation of a book and CD, and a charitable donation to Temedt, a Mali organization working to help enslaved black Tuareg people. Dibb's Kickstarter campaigned amassed 205 backers who pledged $25,985 to help bring the project to life. All the funds that were raised through the Kickstarter campaign were eventually donated to charity and the album was ultimately self-funded by Dibb.

== Reception ==
Professional ratings
Aggregate scores
Source	Rating
Metacritic	84/100
Review scores
Source	Rating
AllMusic	3.5/5 stars
Consequence of Sound	B+
Paste Magazine	8.5/10
Pitchfork	7.6/10
Pretty Much Amazing	A−
Tiny Mix Tapes	4.5/5 marks

The album received acclaim from critics. At Metacritic, which assigns a normalized rating out of 100 to reviews from critics, the album has received an average score of 84, indicating "universal acclaim", based on 6 reviews.

== Track listing ==
All tracks are written by Joshua Dibb.

No.	Title	Length
1.	"Golden Chords"	6:29
2.	"Just Am"	8:08
3.	"Shadow Mine"	1:15
4.	"Footy"	7:19
5.	"Seed Song"	3:12
6.	"Good House"	7:05
Total length:		33:28

== Personnel ==
- Deakin – recording (1–3, 5), mixing (1–5), artwork
- Dutch E Germ (Tim DeWit) – drums (4), samples (6)
- Nicolas Vernhes – recording (4, 6), mixing (4)
- Sonic Boom – mixing (6)
- Greg St. Pierre – artwork
- Rob Carmichael – artwork
