= Meeting of the Waters (EP) =

EP by Animal Collective
- Released: April 22, 2017
- Recorded: Live in the Amazon rainforest outside Manaus, Brazil in early 2016
- Genre: Acoustic; ambient; psychedelia; lo-fi
- Length: 32:09
- Label: Domino

Animal Collective chronology
The Painters (2017)	Meeting of the Waters (2017)	Tangerine Reef (2018)

Meeting of the Waters is the ninth EP by American experimental pop band Animal Collective, released first on Record Store Day, April 22, 2017. It is the second extended play released by the band in 2017. The EP was recorded live on location in the Amazon rainforest. It is notable for containing many recordings of animal calls and some sounds being recorded underwater, as well as being documented in the Viceland series Earth Works. This is the band's first release to feature only Avey Tare (David Portner) and Geologist (Brian Weitz) and currently the only to feature this particular lineup of the collective.

In 2020, the band announced plans to donate a portion of the proceeds from the EP to Cultural Survival, an indigenous rights charity. As the EP features recorded samples of music performed by the Tatuyo tribe in Brazil, a portion of the profits were directed to IDESAM [The Institute for the Conservation and Sustainable Development of the Amazon] upon its release for Record Store Day. In a newsletter to fans, they wrote: "As we were guests in their [the Tatuyo tribe's] world, we feel it is only right to continue to show our gratitude."

== Musical style ==
Regarding the one-time duo's aesthetic, Pitchfork's Stuart Berman felt the EP "takes Campfire Songs off-the-cuff, on the spot ethos and exports it to a Brazilian rainforest", referencing the group's 2003 record under the name Campfire Songs. The first track, "Blue Noses", he described as a "blissed-out psych-folk meditation." Later in the review, he noted "Selection of a Place (Rio Negro Version)" as "a lo-fi love song."

Sputnikmusic's Veta also echoed comparisons to Campfire Songs, with "Blue Noses" noted as a "throwback" to that record while being "peppered with psychedelic ambience that teases the ear."

== Critical reception ==
Professional ratings
Review scores
Source	Rating
Pitchfork	7.3/10
The Spill Magazine	4/5 stars

== Track listing ==
All tracks written by Animal Collective, except where noted.

No.	Title	Writer(s)	Length
1.	"Blue Noses"		13:20
2.	"Man of Oil"		5:25
3.	"Amazonawana/Anaconda Opportunity"		5:06
4.	"Selection of a Place" (Rio Negro Version)	Avey Tare	8:18
Total length:			32:09

The track "Selection of a Place" later appeared on Avey Tare's second solo album Eucalyptus.

== Personnel ==
- Avey Tare - acoustic guitar / lead vocals
- Geologist - electronics
