= Summertime Clothes =

Single by Animal Collective

from the album Merriweather Post Pavilion
- Released: June 29, 2009
- Recorded: February 2008
- Genre: Electropop
- Length: 4:33
- Label: Domino
- Songwriter: Animal Collective
- Producers: Ben H. Allen, Animal Collective

Animal Collective singles chronology
"My Girls" (2009)	"Summertime Clothes" (2009)	"Brother Sport" (2009)

"Summertime Clothes" is a song by experimental pop band Animal Collective. It was released on June 29, 2009 in the UK and on July 7, 2009 in the US as the second single from the band's 2009 album Merriweather Post Pavilion, by Domino Records. The song was originally known as "Bearhug."

The single features three new remixes of the song by Dâm-Funk, Leon Day, and Zomby, and is available as a 12" vinyl single and as a digital download.

== Background ==
The original name of the song was "Bearhug" and featured different lyrics and higher pitched-vocals. In a 2009 interview with French magazine VoxPop, David Portner said, "The melody of this song came suddenly, while we were rehearsing at my house. It's so simple and we immediately loved it. I tried to find an additional melody, much more dark and weird, but nobody liked it! In general, I write the most 'complex' songs in Animal Collective, with structures A / B / C / D / E… but I wanted to keep the almost naive simplicity of this song."

Merriweather Post Pavilion featured more vocals than most of Animal Collective's other albums, and as a result the band had trouble agreeing with their producer about how the vocals were to be mixed, especially when it came to "Summertime Clothes". Brian Weitz stated in an interview with Sound to Sound, "Pretty early on in the mixing we realised we were gonna have to find the middle ground, so we would do three mixes, where the vocals would be where we wanted them to be, then one louder where Ben wanted them to be and then one even lower than where we wanted them to be, just in case we changed our mind. It was very, very rare that we went with the loud vocal version. 'Summertime Clothes' is the biggest example of where we disagreed. Even after we finished the record we were still thinking maybe the vocals are too loud on that song. And Ben felt the opposite way."

== Music video ==
A screenshot from the music video showing one of the clothed figures dancing next to one of the women in giant bubbles.

A music video was released for the song on June 12, 2009, directed by Dan Perez, who also worked on the "Who Could Win a Rabbit" video and the band's film ODDSAC.

The video shows a group of people in large, glowing bubbles resembling embryonic sacs with giant red legs and buttocks dancing in rhythmic movements and patterns, while figures wearing mismatched colored clothing dance erratically, with flashing colored lights illuminating them. They all dance around a glowing ice sculpture of a young boy and girl, which is slowly melting. Occasionally, a screaming white face is seen flashing among the erratic dancing.

The video prominently features the Brooklyn-based FLEX dance crew.

== Critical reception ==
The single received critical acclaim. Melissa Locker of TIME said, "Animal Collective's anthem to summer shows the band at it's [sic] idiosyncratic best. The sing-along melody is filled with catchy hooks and a driving beat that screams sunny day." Mike Deane of Pop Matters said the song "manages to hit a perfect balance of pure pop bliss mixed with wonky and interesting electro instrumentation, and it even maintains a few weirder, more classic Animal Collective bits, like the ending repetition of "just you" and the midway slow down that immediately joins the pulsing syncopation." He also stated that if Animal Collective "can make more hits like "Summertime Clothes" I don't know if I'll ever listen to another band. That's right: It's that good."

Sarah Smith of FasterLouder says that Summertime Clothes is "one of Animal Collective's finest musical moments." Bart Blasengame of Paste said the single is "a robo-tripping love song where—over a bouncing low end and weird harpsichord crescendos—Tare and Panda Bear's harmonies sound absolutely Shins-esque." NME said that the song is a "sun-stroked piece of bio-mechanical mongrel pop with a Neu!-ish rhythm and the feel of Grandaddy in its spacey winsomeness: you could analyse it for hours." Will Hermes of Rolling Stone stated "Summertime Clothes is a swirling pastoral with dance-music thrust."

== In popular culture ==
- "Summertime Clothes" is featured in the soundtrack to the video game Skate 3.
- Animal Collective performed the song live prior to its release on the Late Show with David Letterman on May 7, 2009.

== Remixes ==
Released alongside the single were three remixes by Dâm-Funk, Leon Day AKA L.D., and Zomby respectively.

No.	Title	Length
1.	"Summertime Clothes" (Album Version)	4:33
2.	"Summertime Clothes" (Dâm-Funk Remix)	5:38
3.	"Summertime Clothes" (Leon Day AKA L.D. Remix)	6:20
4.	"Summertime Clothes" (Zomby's Analog Lego Mix)	3:49
