= Centipede Hz =

Studio album by Animal Collective
- Released: September 4, 2012
- Recorded: January–February 2012
- Studios: Sonic Ranch, Tornillo, Texas
- Genres: Neo-psychedelia; indie rock; experimental
- Length: 53:33
- Label: Domino
- Producers: Animal Collective, Ben H. Allen III

Animal Collective chronology
Transverse Temporal Gyrus (2012)	Centipede Hz (2012)	Monkey Been to Burn Town (2013)

Singles from Centipede Hz
- 1. "Today's Supernatural" Released: July 29, 2012; 2. "Applesauce" Released: November 12, 2012

Centipede Hz is the ninth studio album by American experimental pop group Animal Collective, released on September 4, 2012, on Domino Records. The album marks the return of band member Deakin, who sat out of the recording and touring of the band's previous album, Merriweather Post Pavilion (2009). On the US Billboard 200, it peaked at No. 16.

== Background ==
=== Recording ===
In November 2010, Deakin rejoined Animal Collective, after sitting out on the recording and touring of the band's eighth studio album, Merriweather Post Pavilion (2009). With the band receiving significantly more attention, the four members of Animal Collective moved back to their hometown of Baltimore, Maryland in early 2011 to begin writing their ninth studio album. Avey Tare noted, "I moved into a house that was blocks away from our high school - it was definitely a little bit weird to feel this mixture of old and new. [...] Just driving the same roads, going to Josh's mom's place. It's pretty much where we all started playing together for days and nights when we were in high school." Deakin elaborated, "Just having the experience of seeing each other every day was what marked this record."

Almost four years after the album's release, Weitz intimated that "Coming back for Centipede Hz was difficult. It was a super emotional time. Because of the way we set the making of that album up, taking us all to Baltimore, the unsettled nature came out on the record. It was just a very different process from the more easy going one that Merriweather had been. ... we wrote it for the stage and, before recording ... some of us got set ideas about what songs should sound like and where certain parts should fit in. Then, when we went to ooze all four of those different perspectives together—there weren't battles, but it did lead to a lot of things staying in the mix."

=== Production ===
The album was recorded at Sonic Ranch in January and February 2012 and was mixed at Maze Studios in Atlanta. Ben Allen, who co-produced the group's previous album Merriweather Post Pavilion, returned as the co-producer.

In an interview with Pitchfork Media, Avey Tare called Centipede Hz "more grounded in one location" and less ambient than the group's previous album. The group also wanted the album to have a "live-band feel" to it. In turn, live instruments were used such as a sit-down drum kit and live keyboards. Centipede Hz also featured the first Animal Collective song where Deakin sang lead vocals, on "Wide Eyed".

== Musical style and influences ==
Whereas Merriweather Post Pavilion and Fall Be Kind were more oriented around lush sound design and pop structures, Centipede Hz returns to Animal Collective's experimental roots, incorporating surreal and noisy textures, as well as complicated song structures. The band drove inspiration from styles such as psychedelic rock, Chicha music, Tropicália and avant-garde music, with members using songs by artists and bands from the aforementioned styles to indicate the musical direction and sound design of the album during its production.

Radio commercials and station identifications were additional influences on the album's sound; processed recordings of station idents as well as sound effects of radio interference and white noise can be heard throughout the album. The band got the idea for using radio interference while rewriting then in-progress songs on Centipede Hz for a live performance at the 2011 Coachella Valley Music and Arts Festival. The group wanted a continuous sound when playing the Centipede Hz songs live, and they revolved this using radio interference as transitions; this further inspired them with the album's eventual studio production, aiming to recreate their live sound.

Avey Tare noted:

My brother was a DJ when I was growing up, and there was a radio station called B104 in Baltimore. He had recently got a CD of all the radio identifications that come between [songs], and we were going back through everything, listening to how weird and spacey and experimental it sounded.

He also compared the sound of these idents out of their original context to musique concrète, which allowed the band to interpret these samples as musical textures.

== Release ==
Centipede Hz was announced on May 13, 2012, with an official video on their website which contained titles of the songs on the album. The majority of the track list was debuted live during their 2011 tour. The album was also announced to be released in three formats: a standard CD, a standard 2xLP, and a deluxe 2xLP version. All three formats are available to pre-order and include a bonus DVD containing the music files and a video of the band's 2011 Prospect Park show in Brooklyn.

On July 29, as part of the lead-up to the album, Animal Collective began broadcasting weekly "Centipede Radio" shows from a section of their website. During the first show, the first single from the album, "Today's Supernatural" was premiered. The single was also uploaded to Domino Records' YouTube channel on the same day. A music video for "Today's Supernatural" was released on August 16, 2012. On August 19, 2012, the album was streamed in its entirety on Animal Collective's official website, with each song accompanied by a custom video directed by Abby Portner.

== Reception ==
Professional ratings
Aggregate scores
Source	Rating
AnyDecentMusic?	7.5/10
Metacritic	75/100
Review scores
Source	Rating
AllMusic	3.5/5 stars
The A.V. Club	C+
Entertainment Weekly	B
The Guardian	3/5 stars
Los Angeles Times	2.5/4 stars
NME	8/10
Pitchfork	7.4/10
Q	4/5 stars
Rolling Stone	3.5/5 stars
Spin	8/10

=== Critical ===
Centipede Hz received mostly positive reviews, although initial critical reaction to the album was more mixed compared to the group's widely acclaimed previous album, Merriweather Post Pavilion. On Metacritic, the album has a score of 75 out of 100, indicating "generally favorable reviews".

Barry Nicolson of NME called the album "a flawed and imperfect jumble of garish colours and disconnected sensations," but nevertheless gave the album a positive review, concluding: "It's chaotic and confounding. It will frustrate as much as it delights. And no, not everything they throw at the wall manages to stick. But my, what a lovely mess they've made." BBC Music's Mike Diver gave the album a positive review, writing "submit fully to Centipede Hz and it will infect you, quite deliciously, for the foreseeable." Rolling Stone's Jon Dolan gave the album a score 3 1/2 stars out of five, writing "What gives Centipede Hz its relatable gravity is that, this time out, Animal Collective sound more like creatures who put their skinny jeans on one hoof at a time [...] For a band that usually seems to be eternally shambling toward transcendence, a shot of ambivalence is a brave new kind of pick-me-up."

Much of the criticism of the album was directed at the album's dense sound. Pitchfork's Stuart Berman, while giving the album a positive review, criticized the songs for being too cluttered compared to those on previous albums, writing: "Centipede Hz, by comparison, feels like someone throwing a burrito on your windshield: The songs hit with a jolt, instantly splaying all their ingredients before you." Commenting on the return of Deakin, Tom Ewing of The Guardian wrote: "It explains some of the record's bluntness – every track is full of incident, and most incidents are mixed to a similar level, so at first the songs hit you as unresolved slabs of babble." Ewing continued: "This makes Centipede Hz a tough listening experience to begin with, but not a particularly weird one. Once you adjust to the new method and peer through the layers of detail and clustered production, these are often quite conventional – if meandering – indie-rock songs." The A.V. Club's Marc Hirsh, while praising the songs "Pulleys" and "Wide Eyed", wrote "other songs are so densely packed with sonic information that they become nearly impenetrable". Hirsh concluded: "Animal Collective runs riot on the head front so thoroughly that it overlooks its own eagerness to please. Instead, Centipede Hz insists that listeners think their way to liking it."

=== Commercial ===
The album debuted at No. 16 on the Billboard 200 albums chart on its first week of release, with around 17,000 copies sold in the United States. It also debuted at No. 6 on the Billboard's Rock Albums chart, and No. 5 on the Alternative Albums chart. As of January 2016, the album has sold 47,000 copies in the US.

== Track listing ==
All tracks are written by Animal Collective.

No.	Title	Lead vocals	Length
1.	"Moonjock"	Avey Tare	5:04
2.	"Today's Supernatural"	Avey Tare	4:18
3.	"Rosie Oh"	Panda Bear	2:57
4.	"Applesauce"	Avey Tare	5:34
5.	"Wide Eyed"	Deakin	5:00
6.	"Father Time"	Avey Tare	4:35
7.	"New Town Burnout"	Panda Bear	6:01
8.	"Monkey Riches"	Avey Tare	6:46
9.	"Mercury Man"	Avey Tare	4:18
10.	"Pulleys"	Avey Tare	3:31
11.	"Amanita"	Avey Tare	5:39
Total length:			53:33

Sample credits

- "Mercury Man" contains a sample from "Invasion", performed by King Tubby. The original sample is a composition by Morton Subotnick for the intro of Walter Cronkite's program The 21st Century.

== Personnel ==
=== Animal Collective ===
- Avey Tare – vocals, synthesizers, piano, guitar, sampler, sequencer, percussion
- Panda Bear – vocals, drums, sampler, percussion
- Deakin – vocals, baritone guitar, sampler, percussion
- Geologist – sampler, synthesizers, piano, percussion

=== Additional musicians ===
- Dave Scher – lap steel guitar (2, 7 and 10), melodica (3)
- Riverside Middle School Choir – vocals (6 and 7)

=== Recording personnel ===
- Animal Collective – producer
- Ben H. Allen III – producer, recording, engineering, mixing
- Manuel Calderon – recording assistant
- Rob Skipworth – recording assistant
- Brad Truax – recording assistant
- Joe D'Agostino – recording assistant
- Sumner Jones – recording assistant
- Alex Tumay – recording assistant
- Joe Lambert – mastering

=== Artwork ===
- Dave Portner – photography, artwork
- Abby Portner – artwork
- Rob Carmichael – artwork
- Atiba Jefferson – photography

== Charts ==
Chart (2012)	Peak position
Australian Albums (ARIA)	75
Belgian Albums (Ultratop Flanders)	32
Belgian Albums (Ultratop Wallonia)	54
Danish Albums (Hitlisten)	36
Dutch Albums (Album Top 100)	68
Dutch Alternative Albums (MegaCharts)	9
French Albums (SNEP)	66
Norwegian Albums (VG-lista)	34
Swedish Albums (Sverigetopplistan)	38
UK Album (OCC)	55
US Billboard 200	16
US Rock Albums (Billboard)	6
US Independent Albums (Billboard)	4
US Alternative Albums (Billboard)	5
