= Honeycomb / Gotham =

2012 songs by Animal Collective

"Honeycomb"

Single by Animal Collective
- Released: May 6, 2012
- Length: 3:03
- Label: Domino
- Songwriter: Animal Collective
- Producers: Animal Collective, Ben H. Allen III

Animal Collective singles chronology
"Brother Sport" (2009)	"Honeycomb" / "Gotham" (2012)	"Today's Supernatural" (2012)

"Gotham"

Single by Animal Collective
- Released: May 6, 2012
- Length: 5:15
- Label: Domino
- Songwriter: Animal Collective
- Producers: Animal Collective, Ben H. Allen III

Animal Collective singles chronology
"Brother Sport" (2009)	"Honeycomb" / "Gotham" (2012)	"Today's Supernatural" (2012)

"Honeycomb" and "Gotham" are two tracks released as a double A-side single in advance of Animal Collective's ninth studio album, Centipede Hz. It was announced via the band's official website and was made available for free streaming on May 6, 2012. The physical single was put up for presale on Domino's online store, with an MP3 download being available simultaneously. The 7-inch single was released on June 26, 2012. Neither of the songs were released on Centipede Hz. The single has also been referred to as Centipede Hz's EP, or accompanying songs, as they were outtakes from the Centipede Hz recording sessions; this is supported by the fact that the three EPs predating "Honeycomb"/"Gotham" consisted mainly of outtake material that did not make it on their accompanying LPs.

== Track listing ==
No.	Title	Length
1.	"Honeycomb"	3:03
2.	"Gotham"	5:15
