= Water Curses =

EP by Animal Collective
- Released: May 5, 2008
- Recorded: 2007
- Length: 18:05
- Label: Domino
- Producer: Animal Collective

Animal Collective chronology
Strawberry Jam (2007)	Water Curses (2008)	Merriweather Post Pavilion (2009)

Professional ratings
Aggregate scores
Source	Rating
Metacritic	78/100
Review scores
Source	Rating
AllMusic	4/5 stars
Pitchfork	7.3/10

Water Curses is an EP by Animal Collective released in May 2008 on compact disc. 12" vinyl format was released on June 3. Scott Colburn recorded the first three tracks during the band's Strawberry Jam sessions in January 2007. The EP's fourth and final track, "Seal Eyeing", was recorded at Nicolas Vernhes' Rare Book Room Studio in Brooklyn, New York. Vernhes was also charged with the mixing duties for all four tracks. According to a press release issued by the band, Water Curses "find[s] Animal Collective exploring strange new waters."

According to a post on the Domino Records website:

"All four tracks have a more stripped down feel than their recent work on Strawberry Jam. Opener 'Water Curses' mixes mixing carousel and calypso throwing unexpected rhythm up, down and sideways to produce the sound of a smile.

And 'Street Flash' is nearly seven minutes of spaced out hollers, electronics and lullabies that sounds like it's made of honey.

'Cobwebs' is equally languid. Weaving itself around a defiant vocal mantra "I’m not going underground" and boosters of Gospel organ sounds like it's imagining some new kind of space church for Al Green to conduct weddings until it slowly fades away into a sticky ether.

The EP's final track takes the celestial feel into even more blissed-out states. 'Seal Eyeing' is the moment you realise watching vapour trails melt into the sky is not only the most constructive thing you can do, but the only real option that’s left."

Purchase of the vinyl version comes with a MP3 and FLAC download.

== Track listing ==
All songs were written by Animal Collective.

No.	Title	Length
1.	"Water Curses"	3:25
2.	"Street Flash"	6:48
3.	"Cobwebs"	4:14
4.	"Seal Eyeing"	3:38
Total length:		18:05

== Personnel ==
Credits adapted from liner notes.

Animal Collective

- Avey Tare
- Deakin
- Geologist
- Panda Bear

Additional personnel

- Scott Colburn – recording (tracks 1–3)
- Nicolas Vernhes - recording (track 4), mixing
- Joe Lambert - mastering
- Avey Tare - artwork
- Rob Carmichael – design and layout
