= Gnip Gnop / Hounds of Bairro =

2016 song by Animal Collective

"Gnip Gnop"

Single by Animal Collective
- Released: March 18, 2016
- Recorded: 2015
- Label: Domino
- Songwriter: Animal Collective
- Producers: Animal Collective, Sonny DiPerri

"Hounds of Bairro"

Single by Animal Collective
- Released: March 18, 2016
- Recorded: 2015
- Label: Domino
- Songwriter: Animal Collective
- Producers: Animal Collective, Sonny Diperri

"Gnip Gnop" and "Hounds of Bairro" are two tracks by Animal Collective. They were released on a 7" vinyl single, included with the limited edition of their tenth studio album, Painting With. It was announced at the same time as the LP, following a publicity stunt at the Baltimore-Washington International Airport where the band premiered the album over the live speakers on a loop for 12 hours. The songs do not feature on Painting With, however, they were among the batch of 16 songs that were recorded during the sessions for the album at EastWest Studios in 2015.

== Track listing ==
No.	Title	Length
1.	"Gnip Gnop"	4:13
2.	"Hounds of Bairro"	3:29
