= Grass (Animal Collective song) =

Single by Animal Collective

from the album Feels
- Released: September 26, 2005
- Recorded: March, 2005
- Genre: Experimental, freak folk, neo-psychedelia
- Length: 3:00
- Label: Fat Cat
- Songwriter: Animal Collective
- Producer: Animal Collective

Animal Collective singles chronology
"Who Could Win a Rabbit" (2004)	"Grass" (2005)	"The Purple Bottle" (2006)

"Grass" is the first single from Animal Collective's 2005 album, Feels. Pitchfork Media listed the song at #31 on its list of Top 50 Singles of 2005, claiming it is "as infectious as anything on the pop charts this year, and lots more fun to scream along with". The song was subsequently placed at #73 in the same publication's list of "Top 500 Tracks of the 2000s". Stylus also placed it in its Top 50 Singles of 2005 (this time at #44), praising the band's ability to "play tug of war between typical pop dynamics and the skewed perspective of experimental music". The title track was included in the 2008 book The Pitchfork 500.

The single was released in the United Kingdom on both CD and 7" vinyl. On March 21, 2006, it was released in the U.S. and Canada (July 3, 2006 worldwide) with a bonus DVD; the DVD contains music videos for "Grass", "Who Could Win a Rabbit" and "Fickle Cycle", as well as a video and sound collage, "Lake Damage", made by Brian DeGraw of Gang Gang Dance.

== Track listing ==
No.	Title	Length
1.	"Grass"	3:00
2.	"Must Be Treeman"	3:13
3.	"Fickle Cycle"	4:29
