= Spirit They're Gone, Spirit They've Vanished =

Studio album by Avey Tare and Panda Bear (Animal Collective)
- Released: July 31, 2000
- Recorded: May 1999 - September 1999
- Studio: Pistol Ring
- Genres: Psychedelia; electroacoustic; experimental rock
- Length: 60:38
- Label: Animal

Avey Tare chronology
Spirit They're Gone, Spirit They've Vanished (2000)	Danse Manatee (2001)

Panda Bear chronology
Panda Bear (1999)	Spirit They're Gone, Spirit They've Vanished (2000)	Danse Manatee (2001)

Animal Collective chronology
Spirit They're Gone, Spirit They've Vanished (2000)	Danse Manatee (2001)

Spirit They're Gone, Spirit They've Vanished is the first collaborative studio album by Avey Tare (David Portner) and Panda Bear (Noah Lennox), released in August 2000. It was later retroactively classified as the debut studio album by Portner and Lennox's group Animal Collective. The album was first released as a CD on the band's own Animal label (now known as Paw Tracks) with only 2000 copies produced.

It was reissued as a double CD along with Danse Manatee in 2003 on FatCat Records, and later on limited edition vinyl through FatCat. Both UK and US pressings used direct metal mastering.

The album was remastered and reissued again through Domino Recording Company in 2023, containing a new cover art, and a new EP of unreleased material from the era.

== Background ==
All of the songs were written by Avey Tare (David Portner) from 1997 to 1999, except for "Penny Dreadfuls" which was written when he was 16 years old. The process was strongly inspired by his move from Baltimore to New York, which he described as a "dark time" with Brian Weitz (Geologist) being his only friend in the city. Portner and Panda Bear (Noah Lennox) recorded the acoustic guitar and the drums live onto a Tascam 48 eight-track reel-to-reel in Portner's bedroom in Maryland during the summer of 1999. The piano songs along with overdubs were recorded in Portner's parents' living room. Portner wanted the guitar to be "jangled to create this fluttering feeling".

An old Roland SH-2 synthesizer, which Weitz's brother found stored in a camp, was used for the bass sounds. The drums were played with brushes to emulate the albums Ocean Rain and Forever Changes. Avey Tare would dictate what he wanted the rhythm to be through beatboxing. Other sounds, such as the majority of "Spirit They've Vanished", were created through the use of feedback loops.

Future Animal Collective member Deakin (Josh Dibb) helped with the promotion and sent packages to record companies. Portner recalled, "Southern Records called us back immediately and said ‘Is there something wrong with this? This music makes our dogs run out of the room’!"

== Release ==
The original cover art was found by Avey Tare, who considered it fitting. The art was later discovered to be an illustration by Dorothy P. Lathrop from the book Stars To-Night: Verses New and Old for Boys and Girls by Sara Teasdale. The album was intended to be released under Avey Tare's name alone, but he was so impressed by Panda Bear's drumming that he added Panda's name on the front cover. This method of choosing monikers for Animal Collective's recorded output—naming themselves after who played on each respective album—would last until 2003's Campfire Songs.

Included with the original release and later vinyl pressings was an insert with the following story:

Not long ago a young boy named Avey and his friend Panda Bear roamed the patch work which covers the land (some call it forest). They were looked upon by Pan and raised by fairies and the Angels of light who play deep within the Wood. 'Let's make the music of childhood,' Avey shouted one day as the two played. Panda thought this idea was a good one. 'I can use my magical Rythm [sic] sticks and you can play your Sun harp,' he said. So the two began to create melodies and Panda brought rythms [sic] from every direction while Avey sang. All of the songs were about wooden toys and invisible friends and filled with the light of the forest. This is the first group of songs they played.

The title is a quote uttered by Mr. Magoo in Mister Magoo's Christmas Carol.

Songs from this album have occasionally been performed live in the following years. "Chocolate Girl" was re-worked for performances during 2008. The final passages of "Alvin Row" were performed frequently on the 2016–2017 tour and Avey Tare performed a solo version of "La Rapet" on electric guitar during a livestream in June 2020.

== Track listing ==
No.	Title	Length
1.	"Spirit They've Vanished"	5:35
2.	"April and the Phantom"	5:53
3.	Untitled	2:58
4.	"Penny Dreadfuls"	7:58
5.	"Chocolate Girl"	8:28
6.	"Everyone Whistling"	1:00
7.	"La Rapet"	7:52
8.	"Bat You'll Fly"	5:03
9.	"Someday I'll Grow to Be as Tall as the Giant"	3:10
10.	"Alvin Row"	12:39
Total length:		60:38

2023 remaster additional tracks (A Night at Mr. Raindrop's Holistic Pharmacy EP)
No.	Title	Length
1.	"An An Angel"	6:34
2.	"Untitled #1"	6:49
3.	"Bus Travel New York Tare My Face Off pt. 1"	4:28
4.	"Dreams"	5:12
5.	"Bus Travel New York Tare My Face Off pt. 2"	3:12
Total length:		26:15

There has been some confusion about the album's track listing. On the original, limited release, the untitled track #3 was not listed along with the other songs. Since the track listing gave no corresponding track numbers to the rest of the songs, it was incorrectly assumed that tracks #3–9 were actually titled as tracks #4–10 are here, and that "Alvin Row" had no title. This error appears in nearly every review of Spirit following its initial release in 2000. The 2003 FatCat reissue cleared up this misunderstanding by numbering the songs and leaving a blank space for track #3.

There is also some confusion in regards to the true title of the complementary EP released with the 2023 Domino Recording Company reissue, A Night at Mr. Raindrop's Holistic Pharmacy, due to issues regarding pressing and labeling which caused the EP to be improperly titled A Night at Mr. Raindrop's Holistic Supermarket.

== Personnel ==
- Avey Tare – vocals, acoustic guitar, piano, synthesizers, tapes
- Panda Bear – "perfect percussion" (drums)
