= Monkey Been to Burn Town =

EP by Animal Collective
- Released: May 27, 2013
- Genre: Indie rock; neo-psychedelia
- Length: 23:46
- Language: English
- Label: Domino

Animal Collective chronology
Centipede Hz (2012)	Monkey Been to Burn Town (2013)	Live at 9:30 (2015)

Monkey Been to Burn Town is an EP by experimental pop band Animal Collective, released on May 27, 2013 on Domino. The release features three remixes of the track, "Monkey Riches", from the band's ninth studio album, Centipede Hz (2012), and one remix of "New Town Burnout" from the same album.

== Reception ==
Writing for Pitchfork, Mark Richardson gave the EP a mixed review, but praised Shabazz Palaces' contribution, stating: "The Shabazz Palaces cut is easily the most interesting song here, and seems to be the one you might still be pulling out once in a while in another six months. Considering that the EP, with three versions of the same song in a row, isn’t really meant to be heard as a whole, getting one truly intriguing track out of it isn’t such a bad deal."

== Track listing ==
All tracks are written by Animal Collective.

No.	Title	Length
1.	"Monkey Riches" (Brian DeGraw [Gang Gang Dance] Remix)	6:56
2.	"Monkey Riches" (Tha Traxman Teklife Remix)	4:40
3.	"New Town Burnout" (Shabazz Palaces Remix)	7:56
4.	"Monkey Riches" (Teengirl Fantasy Remix)	4:14
Total length:		23:46
