= Here Comes the Indian =

Here Comes the Indian / Ark

Studio album by Animal Collective
- Released: June 17, 2003
- Genres: Psychedelic folk; experimental folk; noise; drone music
- Length: 44:32
- Label: Paw Tracks
- Producer: Nicolas Vernhes

Animal Collective chronology
Campfire Songs (2003)	Here Comes the Indian / Ark (2003)	Sung Tongs (2004)

Here Comes the Indian, later reissued as Ark, is the first album by the American experimental pop band Animal Collective under that name, which released June 17, 2003 on Paw Tracks. It is the first release by the group on which all four members—Avey Tare (David Portner), Panda Bear (Noah Lennox), Geologist (Brian Weitz), and Deakin (Josh Dibb)—perform together. Three earlier albums released by various combinations of these musicians were not billed as Animal Collective until later; however, the 2003 album is now considered the band's fourth.

== Reception ==
Professional ratings
Review scores
Source	Rating
AllMusic	4/5 stars
Pitchfork	8.6/10
The Rolling Stone Album Guide	2/5 stars
Stylus Magazine	A
Uncut	3/5 stars

Reviewing Here Comes the Indian for Stylus Magazine, Ed Howard afforded the album favorable comparisons to Boredoms' Super æ and Vision Creation Newsun. The Rolling Stone Album Guide described the album as more "claustrophobic" than earlier releases by Animal Collective. Uncut's reviewer compared the band to the Residents, "whose absurdist humour the AC also shares".

== 2020 reissue ==
On July 2, 2020, following a reissue of the band's discography on Bandcamp, the group announced that the album's title would be changed to Ark, explaining that "having the word 'Indian' in [their] record title sends the wrong message by objectifying the American Indian people." As the band has "drawn countless inspiration [sic] from Indigenous people in America and around the world", they will also be donating a portion of the royalties from the album to Seeding Sovereignty, an indigenous rights and environmental justice charity. Physical releases of the album still have yet to be reissued with the new branding.

"Ark" is a reference to the title that was given to an early mix of the album that leaked on to the internet, which was also originally then called "Ark". In this incomplete version of the record, most of the vocals had not yet been added, the guitar was more prominent, and the track order was different, with different transitions between songs.

== Track listing ==
No.	Title	Length
1.	"Native Belle"	3:52
2.	"Hey Light"	5:40
3.	"Infant Dressing Table"	8:35
4.	"Panic"	4:48
5.	"Two Sails on a Sound"	12:20
6.	"Slippi"	2:50
7.	"Too Soon"	6:27
Total length:		44:32

== Personnel ==
- Avey Tare
- Panda Bear
- Geologist
- Deakin
- Nicolas Vernhes – engineer
