= People (Animal Collective EP) =

EP by Animal Collective
- Released: October 23, 2006
- Recorded: 2005
- Length: 18:54
- Label: FatCat
- Producer: Scott Colburn

Animal Collective chronology
Feels (2005)	People (2006)	Peacebone (2007)

2020 reissue cover

People is the second EP by American experimental pop band Animal Collective, released in October 2006. The first three songs were recorded during the band's Feels sessions in 2005, while the live version of "People" was recorded on tour in March 2005, just prior to the sessions. The cover originally depicted a "mammy" illustration that was removed for the EP's 2020 digital reissue.

== Reception ==
Professional ratings
Review scores
Source	Rating
Rolling Stone	2.5/5 stars
Pitchfork	7.1/10

Reviewing the EP for Rolling Stone, Christian Howard praised "Tikwid" but dismissed the rest of the record as "weirder and less memorable, as the band dives into the ether and works up head-trip beauty without giving much to latch on to. With two of four tracks of not terribly interesting studio stuff and one of four a live version of the title track, it's hard to recommend People too strongly".

== 2020 reissue ==
In 2020, as a large majority of their back catalogue was to be added to Bandcamp, the band decided to change the artwork for the EP, citing its inclusion of a "racist stereotype", and pledged to donate future royalties from the EP to the Equal Justice Initiative. In a newsletter to fans, they wrote: "There is no way to excuse using a 'mammy' on our artwork, and so we have decided to remove it. We understand now that using a racist stereotype at all causes more damage than an explanation can repair, and we apologize."

== Track listing ==
All tracks are written by Animal Collective (Josh Dibb, Noah Lennox, David Portner, Brian Weitz)

No.	Title	Length
1.	"People"	6:22
2.	"Tikwid"	4:18
3.	"My Favorite Colors"	1:52
4.	"People" (Live)	6:25
Total length:		18:54
