= Danse Manatee =

Studio album by Avey Tare, Panda Bear and Geologist (Animal Collective)
- Released: July 2001
- Recorded: January–March 2001 in Parkton, Maryland and at Columbia University.
- Genre: Experimental rock; noise
- Length: 47:07
- Label: Catsup Plate; FatCat

Animal Collective / Avey Tare / Panda Bear chronology
| Spirit They're Gone, Spirit They've Vanished (2000) | Danse Manatee (2001) | Hollinndagain (2002) |

Professional ratings
Review scores
| Source | Rating |
|---|---|
| PopMatters | (favorable) |
| Pitchfork | 3.9/10 |
| Sputnikmusic | 2/5 stars |

Danse Manatee is the first collaborative studio album between Avey Tare, Panda Bear, and Geologist, released in July 2001 on the label Catsup Plate. It was later retroactively classified as the second studio album by their band Animal Collective.

== Background ==
Only one thousand copies were made for the Catsup Plate release, but it was reissued as a double CD along with Spirit They're Gone, Spirit They've Vanished in 2003 on FatCat Records. Band member Geologist, who joined Avey Tare and Panda Bear for the first time on this release, has said that this is perhaps his favorite Animal Collective album, despite its general lack of popularity among fans and critics.

The album was recorded in many different locations, including Avey's parents' house, the house the band shared in Brooklyn Heights, and Geologist's college dorm room and radio station. To create the sounds the group made use of guitar, synths, samples, and did percussion with whatever was lying around.

The band's goal in the recording and production of the album was to experiment with extreme frequencies and how they were perceived by the listener. This created a challenge during the mastering process, as they could not raise the volume of the whole mix without causing the sounds to digitally distort. Geologist had this to say about the recording of the album on the Collected Animals forum:

We used guitars drums synths and made a bunch of sounds on minidiscs and did percussion stuff on whatever was lying around. We recorded part of it at Dave's parents house, some at the old AC house in Brooklyn Heights, some in my college dorm room and some at my college radio station. Basically wherever we could find a quiet spot. We just wanted to explore a new style of playing on record. This was after the three of us had spent most of the summer improvising and playing around with fusing song structure and noise and looking for ways to do it with fluidity. We were also interested in extreme frequencies, both low and high, and how they occupied space in the room and moved around in your heads. That record upset a lot of people, especially the people that really loved Spirit. Most people still dislike it as we saw when Fat Cat released the two of them together. But we're pretty proud of it.

For the Spirit/Danse reissue on FatCat Records, Danse Manatee was remastered by Sung Tongs producer Rusty Santos.

"Essplode" and "Lablakely Dress" were later re-worked as a mashup with "Fireworks" from Strawberry Jam for live performances during 2007 through 2009.

== Track listing ==
All tracks are written by Animal Collective.

| No. | Title | Length |
|---|---|---|
| 1. | "A Manatee Dance" | 1:02 |
| 2. | "Penguin Penguin" | 2:15 |
| 3. | "Another White Singer (Little White Glove)" | 1:58 |
| 4. | "Essplode" | 3:23 |
| 5. | "Meet the Light Child" | 8:44 |
| 6. | "Runnin' the Round Ball" | 2:07 |
| 7. | "Bad Crumbs" | 1:43 |
| 8. | "The Living Toys" | 7:48 |
| 9. | "Throwin' the Round Ball" | 1:35 |
| 10. | "Ahhh Good Country" | 8:18 |
| 11. | "Lablakely Dress" | 2:38 |
| 12. | "In the Singing Box" | 5:36 |
| Total length: | | 47:07 |

== Personnel ==
- Avey Tare - guitar, vocals, synthesizers, electronics, percussion
- Panda Bear - vocals, synthesizers, electronics, percussion
- Geologist - MiniDiscs, synthesizers, electronics, percussion
