= Fall Be Kind =

EP by Animal Collective
- Released: November 23, 2009
- Recorded: February 2008 – August 2009
- Studios: Sweet Tea (Oxford, Mississippi); Mission Sound (Brooklyn, New York)
- Genres: Neo-psychedelia, Art pop, Ambient Pop
- Length: 27:23
- Label: Domino
- Producer: Ben H. Allen

Animal Collective chronology
Animal Crack Box (2009)	Fall Be Kind (2009)	Oddsac (2010)

Fall Be Kind is the fourth EP by American experimental pop band Animal Collective. It was released digitally in MP3 and WAV formats on November 23, 2009, and as both a CD and LP in the United Kingdom on December 14, 2009, and in the United States on December 15, 2009. Some stores in Australia and New Zealand began selling it more than a week earlier, due to the band's touring presence there at the time.

On November 18, 2009, Domino Records accidentally sent pre-ordered CDs of Fall Be Kind to customers before the actual release date, resulting in a lossless digital version leaking, in its entirety, onto the internet.

Recorded by Ben H. Allen at Sweet Tea in Oxford in February 2008 and at Mission Sound in Brooklyn in August 2009, Fall Be Kind includes live favorites "Graze" and "What Would I Want? Sky". The latter track contains a sample of "Unbroken Chain" by the Grateful Dead, the first ever licensed sample of a Grateful Dead recording. The cover depicts a statue photographed through a brown paper bag attached to the camera lens.

== Background ==
The EP's conceptual atmosphere, accordingly to a Pitchfork review with band member, Avey Tare, being a darker, autumn-orientated companion project to Merriweather Post Pavilion, the band's eight studio album that was released earlier that year, opposing it's spring-ish/summer-ish tonality, with the EP title reaffirming the seasonal theme as a play on the verb "fall behind".

All of the EP's tracks were originally intended, created and worked on during the recording period of Merriweather Post Pavilion. On the same interview with Pitchfork, Avey Tare verified that detail, clarifying the tracks are from the same sessions, with some even appearing on early track-list options for the Merriweather Post Pavilion, additionally, being performed by the band live with early versions of several of the album's latter tracks, before coming to the conclusion the EP tracks do not sonically fit on the album.

== Critical reception ==
Professional ratings
Aggregate scores
Source	Rating
AnyDecentMusic?	7.6/10
Metacritic	84/100
Review scores
Source	Rating
AllMusic	4/5 stars
The A.V. Club	A
Entertainment Weekly	A
Financial Times	4/5 stars
The Independent	4/5 stars
Los Angeles Times	3/4 stars
NME	8/10
Pitchfork	8.9/10
Rolling Stone	3/5 stars
Spin	7/10

Fall Be Kind was met with generally favorable reviews by critics. At Metacritic, the album received an average score of 84, based on 21 reviews, which indicates "universal acclaim". Pitchfork applauded the album, highlighting the band's experimentation alongside the thematic attribution to Merriweather Post Pavilion as it's later-realized, companion EP as "given its fragmented genesis, it's surprising how listenable and of-a-piece Fall Be Kind is", describing the EP as a return that "finds them still on a creative roll". preceding the EP's main review, Pitchfork has also awarded the track "What Would I Want? Sky" a perfect 10/10 score (being only one of the two tracks that has gotten a 10/10 scoring before ending the track ratings), and the Best New Track designation. Lewis P. from Sputnikmusic claimed "it had the impossible task of following up one of the most hyped albums of this decade and yet it barely breaks a sweat." He went on to give a perfect rating.

== Track listing ==
No.	Title	Length
1.	"Graze"	5:23
2.	"What Would I Want? Sky"	6:46
3.	"Bleed"	3:28
4.	"On a Highway"	4:36
5.	"I Think I Can"	7:10
Total length:		27:23

Sample credits

- "Graze" incorporates elements of "Ardeleana", arranged and performed by Gheorghe Zamfir.
- "What Would I Want? Sky" features samples of "Unbroken Chain", written by Phil Lesh and Robert Petersen and performed by the Grateful Dead with Ned Lagin.

== Personnel ==
Credits adapted from liner notes.

Animal Collective

- Avey Tare
- Geologist
- Panda Bear

Additional personnel

- Ben Allen – mixing, recording
- Animal Collective – mixing
- Rob Carmichael – design and layout
- Aaron Ersoy – recording assistance
- Andy Marcinkowski – recording assistance
- Heather McIntosh – cello on "Graze" and "Bleed"
