= Oddsac =

Video by Animal Collective
- Released: January 26, 2010 (Sundance); March 2, 2010 (United States); August 10, 2010 (DVD)
- Length: 52:40
- Director: Danny Perez
- Producer: Gary Hustwit; Brian Betancourt; Chris Ronis; Jojo Li

Animal Collective chronology
Fall Be Kind (2009)	Oddsac (2010)	Keep + Animal Collective (2011)

Oddsac is a visual album by Animal Collective, featuring psychedelic visuals directed and edited by Danny Perez.

First announced in August 2006, the film took over four years to complete. The band members and director Danny Perez dubbed the 53 minute combination of Perez's film and Animal Collective's music a "visual album" or "visual record" in which the visual "scenarios" were created to reflect the music and the music was created to reflect the imagery. The band members make appearances as major characters in the film. According to the band, the film's name is both a pleasant combination of letters and the name for a bag of gummy candies. The film had its world premiere at the Sundance Film Festival on January 26, 2010, It was officially released on DVD on August 10, 2010.

== Production ==
The project was first conceived when Plexifilm approached the band regarding the creation of a documentary or concert film. The band decided to approach Perez about making a film which resulted in Perez going on tour with the band in order to create some concert footage for the upcoming project. This film was never used as the band decided to make a film that was more to 'their taste'. While Perez was on tour with Animal Collective concepts for many of the scenes for the film that would become Oddsac were discussed and the shooting of the film began shortly thereafter. Many of these concepts were based on ideas that the band had been discussing for several years.

During the production of the film the musicians and director collaborated, and thus neither the music nor the film was created independent of the other aspect of the work. This had been the concept of the film since its inception. Josh Dibb explains:

That was the goal of what we were setting out to do. We didn't want to have him make a video and have us score to it and we didn't want to make a piece of music and have him just cut a video to it. So we did a lot of back and forth and ... both things informed each other. And that was what we wanted to make.

Many of the sounds created by the band were inspired directly by the images created by Perez and Perez's images were changed often in response to new music and sounds from the band. The film was shot outdoors in what was intended to be an "alien landscape". The sound from the film footage was not used because of its poor quality and the noise of the generator used on the outdoor set.

== Band member appearances ==
All four Animal Collective band members appear in the film. Some of their appearances are listed as follows:

- David Portner (Avey Tare) appears as a faceless warrior surrounded by fire-twirlers.
- Noah Lennox (Panda Bear) is seen wearing a strange wig that covers his entire face while ominously setting up a drum kit in a dried up river bed.
- Brian Weitz (Geologist) appears as a knight cleansing strange objects in a stream.
- Josh Dibb (Deakin) appears as a 'sad vampire'.

== Release ==
The film was first screened at the Sundance Film festival on January 26, 2010. It was screened several times in various countries throughout Europe and North America. The last screening was held on September 5 in Mexico City's Cineteca Nacional. The film was released on DVD in the US by Plexifilm on August 10, 2010 and is available in Europe from Plexi UK. Various ODDSAC merchandise including posters and t-shirts were also released for the screenings.

== Packaging ==
The band members and Perez have indicated that Oddsac would only be released in theatres and in DVD form. According to Portner (AKA Avey Tare) the band will not release a separate sound-track since the video and audio are intended to be seen and heard in tandem. However, he also stated that fans will inevitably rip the music and listen to the sound track separately. The DVD package includes a 40-page hardcover book containing imagery from the film.

== Track listing ==
All songs written by David Portner, Noah Lennox, Brian Weitz and Josh Dibb.

1. "Mr. Fingers" – 7:01
2. "Kindle Song" – 2:53
3. "Satin Orb Wash" – 2:53
4. "Green Beans" – 2:22
5. "Screens" – 3:39
6. "Urban Creme" – 6:36
7. "Working" – 2:45
8. "Tantrum Barb" – 3:42
9. "Lady on the Lake" – 3:52
10. "Fried Camp" – 5:12
11. "Fried Vamp" – 3:46
12. "Mess Hour House" – 3:10
13. "What Happened?" – 4:40
