= Brother Sport =

Single by Animal Collective

from the album Merriweather Post Pavilion
- Released: November 9, 2009
- Recorded: February 2008
- Genre: Pop, Afrobeat
- Length: 6:00
- Label: Domino
- Songwriter: Animal Collective
- Producers: Ben H. Allen, Animal Collective

Animal Collective singles chronology
"Summertime Clothes" (2009)	"Brother Sport" (2009)	"Honeycomb / Gotham" (2012)

"Brother Sport" is the third single from Animal Collective's 2009 album Merriweather Post Pavilion, released on November 9, 2009 by Domino Records. The single is available as a 10" vinyl single and as a digital download. It was written by Panda Bear to encourage his brother into talking about previous ordeals that had troubled him. The single's B-side is a live recording of "Bleed" with an extended jam linking into "What Would I Want? Sky" recorded May 27, 2009 at Henry Miller Memorial Library, Big Sur, CA.

New Musical Express called it a "resplendent orgy of Afrobeat pop with touches of hard house, like Orbital double-dropping with Fela Kuti or Vampire Weekend in space." In 2012, Stereogum ranked the song number two on their list of the 10 greatest Animal Collective songs, and in 2015, Paste ranked the song number one on their list of the 12 greatest Animal Collective songs.

== Track listing ==
No.	Title	Length
1.	"Brother Sport"	5:50
2.	"Bleed" (Live)	9:42
