= Sung Tongs =

Studio album by Animal Collective
- Released: May 3, 2004
- Recorded: September 7–28, 2003
- Studio: Hades (Lamar, Colorado)
- Genres: Freak folk; psychedelic folk; avant-pop; indie rock
- Length: 52:50
- Label: FatCat
- Producer: Animal Collective

Animal Collective chronology
Here Comes the Indian (2003)	Sung Tongs (2004)	Prospect Hummer (2005)

Singles from Sung Tongs
- 1. "Who Could Win a Rabbit" Released: July 19, 2004

Sung Tongs is the fifth studio album by American experimental pop band Animal Collective, released on May 3, 2004 by FatCat Records. The album, newly exploring freak folk, received high critical reception upon its release and was featured in best-of lists at the end of 2004 and the decade of the 2000s. Only two of the band's four members play on the album, Avey Tare (David Portner) and Panda Bear (Noah Lennox), a first since Spirit They're Gone, Spirit They've Vanished (2000), which was originally credited to the duo and only later retroactively classified as part of the band's discography.

== Background ==
Portner and Lennox both moved into a house in rural Colorado for the recording sessions for Sung Tongs, with Portner saying that much of it involved "Lots of singing and messing around with doing vocals in all parts of a room." He disclosed on the Collected Animals messageboard in 2006 that:

we recorded it on the same tascam 48 (half inch 8 track) that I recorded Spirit on and the drums guitars and early electronics for Danse Manatee. That is we recorded the acoustic guitars and the vocals on 8 tracks. Then we mixed it down on Rusty's laptop and recorded many vocal and percussion over dubs. He's been using that for years. We mixed it from that onto....something..(i cant remember) at Noah's mom's place in Baltimore. It was very cold so we had to wear jackets the whole time. We added in all those samples and electronics there. We mixed for awhile so its sweet you like the mixing. Oh and we used AKGs and an old ribbon mic to record with. Though we had a pzm and some sm57s that we might have used as well. I remember using the pzm to record me slamming the door of the house which is what that distorted rhythm track in kids on holiday is. The person talking at the beginning of Who Could Win a Rabbit is someone in a deli in my neighborhood.

The track "Visiting Friends" was influenced by German minimal techno label Kompakt’s Pop Ambient compilations and Wolfgang Voigt's ambient project Gas, with the intention of being "like a wall of hums [...], but with acoustic guitars."

The album's title is a spoonerism of "tongue songs".

== Reception and legacy ==
Professional ratings
Aggregate scores
Source	Rating
Metacritic	83/100
Review scores
Source	Rating
AllMusic	4/5 stars
Alternative Press	4/5
The Boston Phoenix	3/5 stars
Mojo	4/5 stars
Now	4/5
Pitchfork	8.9/10
PopMatters	8/10
Rolling Stone	3/5 stars
Stylus Magazine	A−
Uncut	5/5 stars

Sung Tongs has received positive reviews. On the review aggregate site Metacritic, the album has a score of 83 out of 100, indicating "Universal acclaim".

Sung Tongs has sold 27,000 copies in US according to Nielsen Soundscan.

The album was performed live in its entirety by the duo for Pitchfork's 21st birthday on December 2, 2017. It was followed by a tour in 2018.

The album has appeared on the following best-of lists:

- #9 in Pitchfork's Top 100 Albums of the Decade's First Half (2000–2004)
- #2 in Pitchfork's Top 50 Albums of 2004
- #27 in Pitchfork's Top 200 Albums of the 2000s
- #2 in Tiny Mix Tapes' Top 100 Albums of the 2000s

== Track listing ==
All music is composed by Animal Collective.

No.	Title	Length
1.	"Leaf House"	2:42
2.	"Who Could Win a Rabbit"	2:18
3.	"The Softest Voice"	6:46
4.	"Winters Love"	4:55
5.	"Kids on Holiday"	5:47
6.	"Sweet Road"	1:15
7.	"Visiting Friends"	12:36
8.	"College"	0:53
9.	"We Tigers"	2:43
10.	"Mouth Wooed Her"	4:24
11.	"Good Lovin Outside"	4:26
12.	"Whaddit I Done"	4:05
Total length:		52:50

== Personnel ==
- Avey Tare
- Panda Bear
- Rusty Santos – engineering
- Abby Portner – cover art
- Rob Carmichael – design and layout
