= Deakin (musician) =

American musician

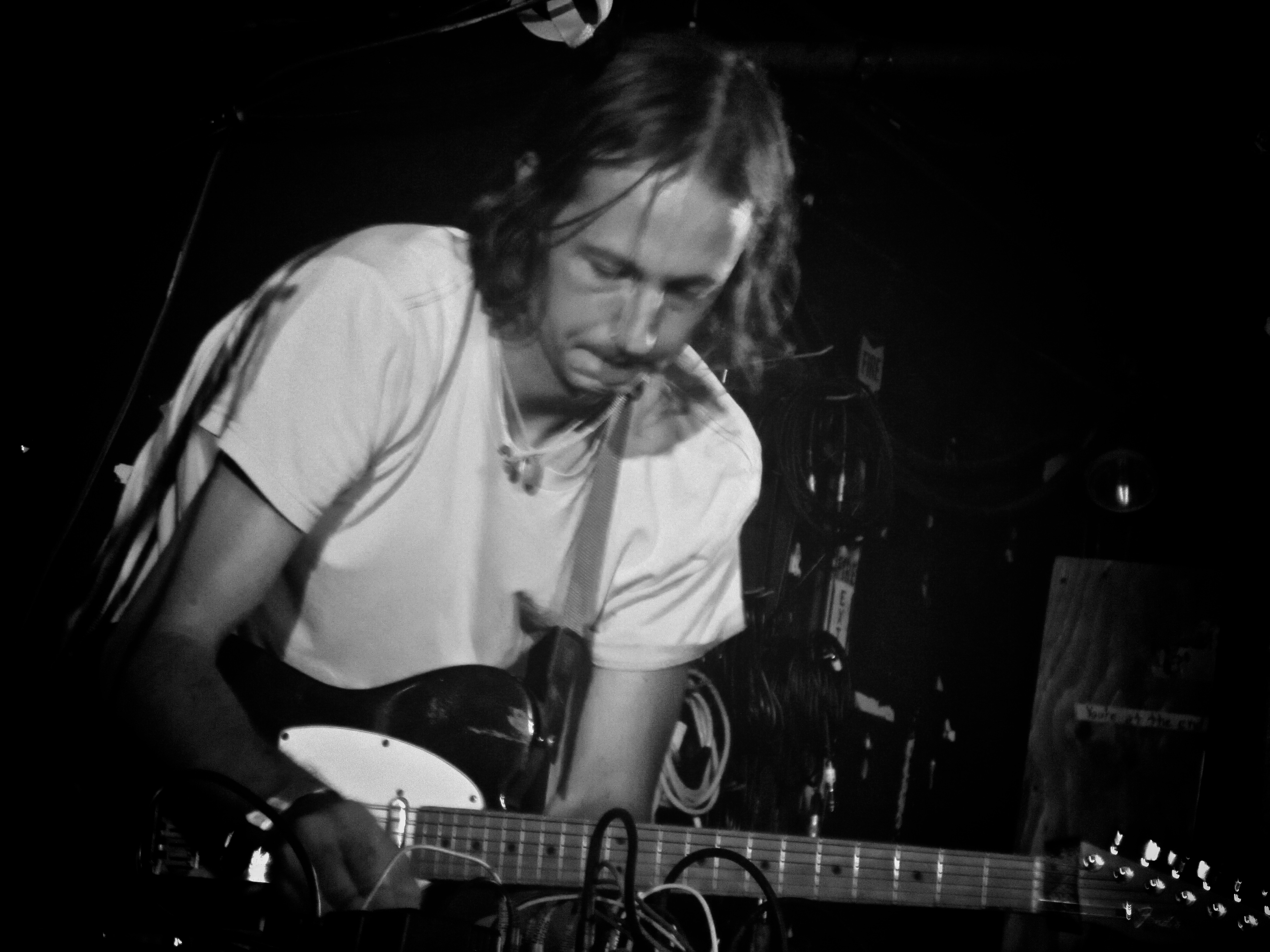
- Deakin performing a solo set in September 2010

Background information
- Also known as: Conrad Deacon, Deacon, Sweet James, Deaken
- Born: Joshua Caleb Dibb; January 6, 1978 (age 48); Orange, California, U.S.
- Genres: Psychedelic pop; neo-psychedelia; experimental rock; electronic; freak folk
- Occupations: Musician, carpenter
- Instruments: Guitar; vocals; synthesizer; percussion; drum machine; electronics; bass; piano
- Years active: 1999–present
- Labels: Paw Tracks; FatCat; Domino; Catsup Plate; St. Ives

Joshua Caleb Dibb (born January 6, 1978), also known by his moniker Deakin, is an American musician who co-founded the experimental pop band Animal Collective. He is the most infrequent member of the collective appearing on only nine of the group's fourteen studio albums. In 2016, he made his solo debut with the album Sleep Cycle. He has also occasionally worked as a carpenter during musical down time.

== Biography ==
Dibb was born on January 6, 1978, in Orange, California to Jessica B Mendlovitz and David C Dibb, who married in 1977. He began writing and recording music with childhood friend Noah Lennox (Panda Bear) in 1991. While at The Park School of Baltimore, Josh met David Portner (Avey Tare) and Brian Weitz (Geologist) when they asked him to join their band, Automine. Josh introduced Noah to Dave and Brian and over the next few years the four spent time playing music together and sharing tapes of music they made individually.

After high school, Panda Bear and Deakin went to Boston, where Deakin attended Brandeis University. Avey Tare and Geologist moved to New York City to attend NYU and Columbia University respectively. After months of playing the band finally settled on the name "Animal Collective". After touring with the group from 2004 to the end of 2006 and recording two albums, Feels and Strawberry Jam, the Water Curses EP and the visual album ODDSAC he decided to take a break from the increasingly rigorous touring schedule. After not participating in the recording of the album Merriweather Post Pavilion, he rejoined the band live on April 10, 2011, in Petaluma, California after a three-year absence.

On January 1, 2010, he played his first solo show as Deakin at The Ottobar in Baltimore, MD where he grew up. In December 2009, Deakin raised $25,985 through the Kickstarter crowdfunding platform to travel to Mali to play at the music festival Festival au Désert outside of Tomboctou in January 2010 and to record an album in early 2010. After playing the music festival, Deakin played five shows in Europe, including a few shows opening for Panda Bear.

On January 7, 2016, Dibb sent backers of his Kickstarter campaign an announcement that his long awaited solo album was complete. The album, titled Sleep Cycle, was released on Bandcamp on April 6, 2016. "Just Am" was the first track shared from the album, accompanied by a music video.

== Tour history ==
=== with Animal Collective ===
- 2002
- Spring 2004 – Fall 2006
- Spring 2011 – December 2013
- October 2019
- 2021–2022
- October 2026

== Discography ==
=== Albums ===
Solo albums

- Sleep Cycle (2016)

Appearances as a member of Animal Collective

- Campfire Songs (2003)
- Here Comes the Indian (2003)
- Feels (2005)
- Strawberry Jam (2007)
- ODDSAC (2010) *
- Centipede Hz (2012)
- Tangerine Reef (2018) *
- Time Skiffs (2022)
- Isn't It Now? (2023)

" * " indicates visual album

=== Singles ===
- "Wastered" (split w/ Black Dice) (2004)
- "Harpy Sketches" (2016)

=== Remixes ===
- Palms - "Boundary Waters (Deakin of Animal Collective Remix)" (2009)
- Phoenix - "Love Like A Sunset (Animal Collective Remix - Deakin's Jam)" (2009)
- Tinariwen - "Tameyawt (Deakin of Animal Collective Remix)" (2012)
- Yoko Ono & Plastic Ono Band - "There's No Goodbye Between Us (Remix by Deakin of Animal Collective)" (2016)
- Niagara - "Hyperocean (Animal Collective / Deakin Remix)" (2016)
- M83 - "Go!" (Animal Collective / Deakin Remix) (2017)
- Avey Tare - "Ms. Secret (Deakin Remix)" (2018)
- The Avalanches - "Extra Kings (Deakin Remix)" (2021)
- Pantha Du Prince - "Liquid Lights (Deakin of Animal Collective Remix)" (2023)

=== Film scores ===
- Crestone (2020) - composed with Brian Weitz
- The Inspection (2022) - composed with Brian Weitz and David Portner
- Jetty (2023) - composed with Brian Weitz
- OBEX (2023)

=== Mixing and Production ===
- Young Prayer (Panda Bear) - Recorded
- Sinister Grift (Panda Bear) - Co produced with Noah Lennox, engineered and mixed by Deakin
- Down There (Avey Tare) - Tracked and mixed
- Eucalyptus (Avey Tare) - Tracked, mixed and co-produced
- Conference of Birds/Birds In Disguise (Avey Tare) - Mixed
- Shadow Temple (Prince Rama) - Recorded and mixed
- 123 (Tickley Feather) - Co-production with Dave Cooley and Tickley Feather, recorded and mixed by Deakin
- Bridge To Quiet (Animal Collective) - Mixed
- Tangerine Reef (Animal Collective) - Mixed with Brian Weitz
- Crestone OST (Animal Collective) - Co-Production and Mixing with Brian Weitz
- A Night at Mr. Raindrops Holistic Pharmacy (Animal Collective) - Mixed
- The Inspection OST (Animal Collective) - Co-produced, co-engineered and mixed
- Linear B (Herald) - Co-produced with Herald, mixed
- Sleep Cycle (Deakin) - Produced, recorded and mixed
- End Times (Queens) - Recorded

=== Miscellaneous ===
- "In The City That Reads" on Arto Lindsay's album Invoke (June 25, 2002, Righteous Babe Records), credited as Avey Tare, Deaken, Geologist, Panda Bear
- "Seeing Twinkles" on the sampler Music for Plants (June 2005, PerfectIfOn), under the name Deaken and Geologist
- "Country Report" on the cassette tape Keep + Animal Collective (March 2011, Keep)
