= Campfire Songs (Animal Collective album) =

Studio album by Campfire Songs
- Released: March 2003
- Recorded: November 2001
- Genre: Psychedelic folk
- Length: 42:10
- Labels: Catsup Plate; Paw Tracks

Animal Collective chronology
Hollinndagain (2002)	Campfire Songs (2003)	Here Comes the Indian (2003)

Professional ratings
Aggregate scores
Source	Rating
Metacritic	66/100
Review scores
Source	Rating
AllMusic	3.5/5 stars
Consequence of Sound	A-
Stylus	B+
Pitchfork	7.2/10

Campfire Songs is the debut and only album by the American band Campfire Songs, released in March 2003. A collaborative work between Dave Portner, Noah Lennox, and Josh Dibb, it was later retroactively classified as the third studio album by their band Animal Collective.

== Recording ==
The album comprises five individual songs played back to back and recorded in one take. Although it was the middle of November and thus very cold, the recording was made outside on a screen porch in Maryland, using three Sony MiniDisc players with Sony ECM-MS907 microphones placed strategically around the band. Ambient sound from the surrounding area was also recorded in January 2002 and added later to "Queen in My Pictures" and "Moo Rah Rah Rain". The album was mixed at Avey Tare's apartment in Bushwick and later mastered with Nicolas Vernhes at Rare Book Room.

An aborted recording session for the album took place in December 1999, and included the track "Bleak Midwinter", which is not on the final tracklisting. It premiered on Geologist's radio program The O'Brien System in 2018. "Doggy" was re-worked for live performances along with "Hey Light" from Here Comes the Indian in 2007.

About the recording and the idea for this record, Panda Bear said in 2005:

We had had the idea of doing something really warm and inviting-sounding for a while, like three or four years at least. We wanted it to sound like a campfire feels and I think that also made us think of campfire songs that you can sing with a bunch of people and everybody gets connected and feels good and safe. It really wasn’t spontaneous or improvised [...]. We worked for a month or so to get it just right like the transitions between songs. I still think Queen Of My Pictures into Doggy is one of the best things we’ve done together. I was really excited about my singing on Campfire Songs, I guess because I felt like I was doing things that were difficult for me to do.

The three members of Animal Collective performing on this album are Avey Tare, Panda Bear, and Deakin, who makes his debut appearance here. It is their only album featuring this lineup. Although member Geologist does not perform on the album, he was present for the recording to operate the MiniDisc players. At this point in time, despite the presence of all four original members, there was still no Animal Collective proper; the name Campfire Songs was intended to be the name of the band performing the album, as well as the name of the album itself. However, the band name 'Animal Collective' is used in the booklet from the latest copies of the album.

About one week before recording, they played the whole album live at Tonic in New York City, sitting in the middle of the floor while the audience surrounded them.

The original Catsup Plate version of the album went out of print in 2008, and was reissued by Paw Tracks Records on January 26, 2010.

== Track listing ==
No.	Title	Length
1.	"Queen in My Pictures"	9:58
2.	"Doggy"	4:40
3.	"Two Corvettes"	4:58
4.	"Moo Rah Rah Rain"	11:00
5.	"De Soto de Son"	11:34
Total length:		42:10

== Personnel ==
- Avey Tare (as "Doon") - acoustic guitar, vocals
- Panda Bear (as "Sia") - acoustic guitar, vocals
- Deakin (as "Sweet James") - acoustic guitar, backing vocals
