= Animal Collective =

American experimental pop band

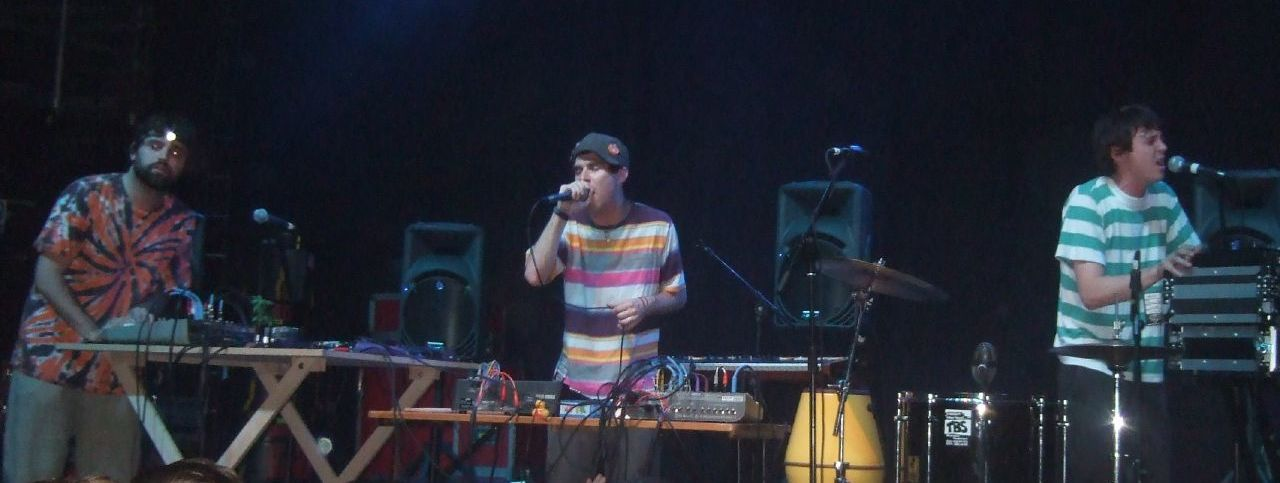
- Animal Collective performing as a trio in 2007. From left to right: Geologist, Avey Tare, and Panda Bear.

Background information
- Origin: Baltimore County, Maryland, U.S
- Genres: Psychedelic pop; neo-psychedelia; experimental rock; electronic; freak folk
- Years active: 1999–present (Note: The band's releases before Here Comes the Indian in 2003 were released originally only under the members' stage names; however, the Animal Collective name was in irregular use in the press before the band adopted the name for themselves.)
- Labels: Animal; Catsup Plate; St. Ives; Paw Tracks; FatCat; Domino
- Spinoffs: Croz Boyce
- Members: Avey Tare; Panda Bear; Geologist; Deakin
- Website: myanimalhome.net

Animal Collective is an American experimental pop band from Baltimore, Maryland. It has comprised multi-instrumentalists Avey Tare (David Portner), Panda Bear (Noah Lennox), Geologist (Brian Weitz), and Deakin (Josh Dibb) since inception. The band's work is characterized by an eclectic exploration of styles, including psychedelia, freak folk, noise, and electronica, with the use of elements such as loops, drones, sampling, vocal harmonies, and sound collage. AllMusic's Fred Thomas suggests that the group "defined the face of independent experimental rock during the 2000s and 2010s."

The band members met in school and started recording together in various forms of collaboration from a young age. In 1999, they established the record label Paw Tracks, issuing what is now considered their debut album, Spirit They're Gone, Spirit They've Vanished (2000), as well as work by other artists. The band's 2007 album Strawberry Jam was their first to chart on the Billboard 200. Their 2009 follow-up Merriweather Post Pavilion was the band's most commercially successful album, reaching No. 13 on the US chart; its reverb-heavy psychedelic pop sound proved highly influential to independent music of the subsequent decade.

Records released under the Animal Collective moniker may include contributions from any or all of its members. Evolving from early collaborations between Lennox and Portner, the collective was not officially established until all four members came together for the 2003 album currently titled Ark. Most prior collaborations between the band members were then retroactively classified under Animal Collective's discography. In the case of Dibb, who often takes breaks from recording and performing with the band, his time off does not constitute full leave.

== History ==
=== Origins and early influences ===
Animal Collective grew out of childhood friendships in Baltimore County, Maryland. Noah Lennox and Josh Dibb met in the second grade at the Waldorf School of Baltimore and became good friends. After the eighth grade, Lennox went away to a Waldorf high school in Pennsylvania, while Dibb enrolled at The Park School of Baltimore, where David Portner had studied since grade school. In 1993, Brian Weitz moved from Philadelphia to Baltimore County and began attending Park as well, becoming friends with Portner. According to Lennox, they attended "progressive" schools that emphasized creativity, imagination and artistic self-expression as part of "a complete kind of education". Weitz and Portner started playing music together at the age of fifteen because of their shared love of the band Pavement and horror movies. Their musical range included cover songs by Pavement and The Cure as well as the songs "Poison" by Bell Biv DeVoe and "Seasons in the Sun" by Terry Jacks.

When Portner and Weitz met Dibb later in high school, they started an indie rock band called Automine with schoolmates Brendan Fowler (a.k.a. BARR) and David Shpritz, being the only ones they knew who wrote their own songs. "We [once] set up a show with four bands—bands that were different formations of us", Portner remembered in an interview with Baltimore City Paper. At that time, the group did not have any contact with the music scene in Baltimore and "was more about the back porch". In 1995, Automine self-released their first and only record, the 7-inch-single Paddington Band. Around that time, they also had their first experiences with psychedelic drugs like LSD and started to improvise while playing music.

We had never heard so-called experimental music at the time, we didn't know that people made music with textures and pure sound. So we started doing that ourselves in high school, walls of drones with guitars and delay pedals and us screaming into mics.

— Dave Portner, 2005

The four started to discover psychedelic rock bands like Can and Silver Apples, as well as local experimental groups such as Climax Golden Twins and Noggin. Meanwhile, Dibb had introduced Lennox to Portner and Weitz, and the four of them began playing music in different group lineups (and often solo), producing several home recordings and swapping them and sharing ideas. Using a drum machine for the first time, Weitz and Portner started a duo named Wendy Darling, whose sound was inspired by soundtracks of horror movies like The Texas Chain Saw Massacre and The Shining, especially György Ligeti and Krzysztof Penderecki.

In 1997, Lennox and Dibb both went off to college in the Boston area (Boston University and Brandeis University), and Portner and Weitz attended schools in New York City (NYU and Columbia University). Lennox and Dibb assembled Lennox's debut album, Panda Bear, during this time from the multitude of recordings Lennox had made in the previous years and established the label Soccer Star Records to release it.

=== 2000–2009 ===
==== Spirit They're Gone, Spirit They've Vanished ====
Abhorring the new life as a student at NYU, Portner, along with Weitz, returned to Maryland every summer to meet Lennox and Dibb and play music together. At that time Portner was also working on a record, which eventually became Spirit They're Gone, Spirit They've Vanished. Portner asked Lennox to play drums on the record and they recorded them along with piano and acoustic guitars in the summer of 1999. The rest of the year, Portner returned to Maryland on weekends to record overdubs and finish the mixing. It was finally released in the following summer under the name Avey Tare and Panda Bear. Soccer Star morphed into the Animal label, with the intention of putting out music that came from the four musicians.

In parallel with his environmental policy and marine biology studies, Weitz hosted a noise show at WKCR, Columbia's college radio station. On weekends, he and Portner borrowed avant-garde music records and listened to them all night at Weitz's dorm room which rapidly broadened their musical horizon.

... everything since then has been a variation of what we explored that summer. Dave and I had already made the Spirit They're Gone record, but during the summer we really cracked the egg open. It seemed like we could go anywhere we wanted after that.

— Noah Lennox, 2005

In the summer of 2000, the four friends spent several months at Portner's apartment in downtown New York City intensely playing music together using antiquated synthesizers, acoustic guitars, and household objects. According to Lennox, in this summer the basis for all of Animal Collective's later music was created. However, all recordings of this period were stolen when Portner changed apartments and packed up the car the night before he moved.

While studying, Dave Portner organized shows at New York University for a while. In class, he met and became friends with Eric Copeland, and Portner organized a show for Copeland's band Black Dice. In 2000, Spirit They're Gone, Spirit They've Vanished was finished, Lennox and Dibb left school in Boston and moved to New York City, and the group's music became much more collaborative in nature. After introducing Lennox to Copeland, Portner and Lennox played their first show together in New York at The Cooler with Dogg and Pony, The Rapture, and Black Dice in late summer of 2000.

This was also the first time they wore makeup and masks, which later became a prominent characteristic of the group's live performances. From there on, Portner wore a mask for the first two years of the group performing. Lennox wore a panda hood on his head and later put face paint on; throughout the Europe tour in early 2004 he wore a white wig and went by the name Edgar. Dibb performed masked during the Here Comes the Indian tour. On the Australia tour in November 2006 and inspired by Halloween, they wore masks for the last time. According to Portner, the reason for disguising was to "help us be more relaxed and find an easier place in that other world we wanted people to join us in". They eventually stopped because they felt like it could become "too gimmicky" and distract from the music, although Weitz still sports a head lamp at live performances, as he did from the beginning.

==== Danse Manatee, Campfire Songs, and Here Comes the Indian ====
After Portner and Lennox had played clubs around New York City in twos, Weitz came on board in the end of 2000 and began performing with them. Much of the live material from this time eventually was on Danse Manatee (Catsup Plate), released by label owner and longtime collaborator Rob Carmichael, who has steered art direction for all Animal Collective releases since 2004. Danse Manatee was released in 2001 under the name of Avey Tare, Panda Bear and Geologist. The trio would also occasionally use the name Forest Children when performing live during this period.

Notably, the close friendship with Black Dice has been a major influence throughout the group's career. In the summer of 2001, Black Dice took them as support on their first tour, which was captured on the 2002 live album Hollinndagain. It was released by St. Ives, a boutique label run by Secretly Canadian which releases limited edition vinyl only records. Limited to 300 copies, each of which featured a one-of-a-kind handmade cover, Hollinndagain is among the rarest of Animal Collective artifacts. It was re-released, both on CD and vinyl, on October 31, 2006, through the Paw Tracks label.

At this point, Dibb began to perform with the group. The next album to be released was Campfire Songs, again working with Catsup Plate in 2003. The Campfire Songs concept and some of the material dated back to the earliest Avey Tare and Panda Bear shows in New York City. Recorded live in 2001 on Portner's aunt's screened-in porch in Monkton, Maryland, the record is one take of five songs played straight through. Attempting to make a record as warm and inviting as a campfire, the band recorded their performance straight to minidisc, with one recorder outside to grab the ambient sound of the environment. Field recordings of the surrounding area were also added. The original album is out of print but Paw Tracks reissued it on January 26, 2010.

After this recording session, they began to work on new material that was later released on Here Comes the Indian. It was at this time when they began to face serious problems within the group. In early 2002, they went on their first big tour which took them to the South of the US. Of this time, Portner said, "We all lost our minds on that tour". Right before their next tour in summer, Weitz got the message that he was accepted to his first choice graduate school in Arizona. After three chaotic days on the road with their tour van breaking down, equipment getting damaged, struggles with a lack of money, the tour was about to be cancelled. On the Collected Animals message board, Weitz wrote, "At that point we all knew we'd get back from tour, record the songs, and then we needed space from each other, and we still had more than 2 weeks left on the road".

Worrying that Avey Tare, Panda Bear, Deakin and Geologist would be too long-winded a moniker, and with record companies advising that a unifying name would be necessary for the marketplace, the group decided to adopt a catch-all name. Using their old label of Animal as inspiration, they picked "Animal Collective". This formation was intended to be different from a straightforward band, giving the musicians the freedom to work in combinations of two to four, as dictated by the project at hand or their mood. Their first entry under this name was Here Comes the Indian, which was released in 2003 by their newly formed record label, Paw Tracks, formed with Carpark Records' Todd Hyman. Animal Collective makes decisions on what Paw Tracks is to release, while Hyman runs the day-to-day operations. The Animal label was abandoned upon the formation of Paw Tracks. Here Comes the Indian was the first record to feature all four of Animal Collective.

After the two releases in 2003 attracted attention, Black Dice introduced the group to the Fat Cat Records label. The first Fat Cat release from Animal Collective was a double disc package of Spirit They've Gone, Spirit They've Vanished and Danse Manatee.

==== Sung Tongs, Feels, and Strawberry Jam ====
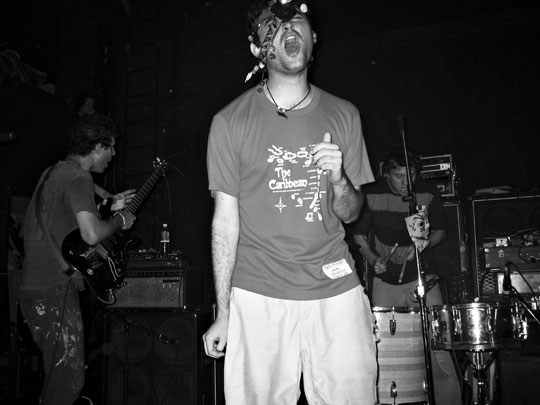
Animal Collective performing live on December 27, 2006 (left to right: Avey Tare, Geologist, Panda Bear)

After the dense soundscapes of Here Comes the Indian, Portner and Lennox decided to concentrate on more stripped-down material. Each of them began composing material and they performed as a duo usually with just acoustic guitars, a single drum, some effects and their voices. The duo toured the world for the better part of a year with this new material, opening for múm and Four Tet among others, before retreating to Lamar, Colorado to record the material with Rusty Santos, a New York musician and friend. The result was the 2004 album Sung Tongs, released on Fat Cat Records, which received a favorable Pitchfork review.

In the meantime, Brian Weitz returned from Arizona and he and Josh Dibb joined the duo again. All four started writing new songs together which finally ended up on their 2005 release Feels. Animal Collective, as the duo of Panda Bear & Deakin (a.k.a. Noah's Ark), toured in Japan for the first time in February 2004 with Carpark Records' artists Greg Davis & Ogurusu Norihide. In early 2004, they started touring with their regular setlists including exclusively post-Sung-Tongs material, except for "We Tigers" and "Who Could Win a Rabbit?", which have been performed regularly up to the present. During their Europe tour, the group was introduced to Vashti Bunyan in Edinburgh, Scotland by Kieran Hebden (AKA Four Tet), who had recently played in Bunyan's band. Being fans of the cult folk singer's 1970 album Just Another Diamond Day, the group had dinner with Bunyan and asked her to collaborate on some recordings. The group encouraged her to sing lead vocals on three songs left over from the Sung Tongs era, released on the Prospect Hummer EP in early 2005. Weitz, who had started a day job in early 2004, could not join this tour and therefore missed the recording session with Bunyan, but contributed one instrumental song to the EP.

Spring of 2005 saw the group refining soon to be released Feels material while on tour. The spring tour included performances at small to mid-sized venues such as BAR Nightclub in New Haven, Connecticut and the Bowery Ballroom in New York City. Colleges and universities throughout the northeast United States also held concerts, including Middlebury College, Bennington College and State University of New York at Purchase. Ariel Pink supported as an opening act for the tour and Animal Collective's sets were well received as the buzz around the band slowly increased.

In October 2005, Animal Collective released Feels, recorded in Seattle with Climax Golden Twins' Scott Colburn, known for his work with the Sun City Girls. Following the release of Feels, Animal Collective mounted their most extensive tour, which lasted into the Fall of 2006 and saw them visit Australia and New Zealand for the first time in addition to many European festivals and North American dates, including a headline set in the Carling Tent at the Reading and Leeds festival. In the summer of 2006, Dibb's father died, which led to a show breakup after only two songs at Rock Herk Festival on July 15.

In the late fall of 2006, Animal Collective released People in Australia as a 7" on their Australian label Spunk Records, and worldwide as a 12" and EP in early 2007 on Fat Cat Records. It contains three studio songs "People", "Tikwid", and "My Favorite Colors", as well as a live version of "People".

In January 2007, Domino Recording Company announced that it would release the new, then still unnamed, Animal Collective album. During the recording process in early 2007, Dibb announced via the Collected Animals forum that he would take a break from touring for a "myriad of personal reasons" until fall. Animal Collective performed live as a three-piece from that time until late 2009 with Deakin making his return to live performances in 2011.

On July 4, 2007, Strawberry Jam was leaked online. The album was released in the U.S. on September 11, 2007, and received much acclaim and multiple accolades, including Album of the Year from Pitchfork Media and Tiny Mix Tapes.

==== Merriweather Post Pavilion ====
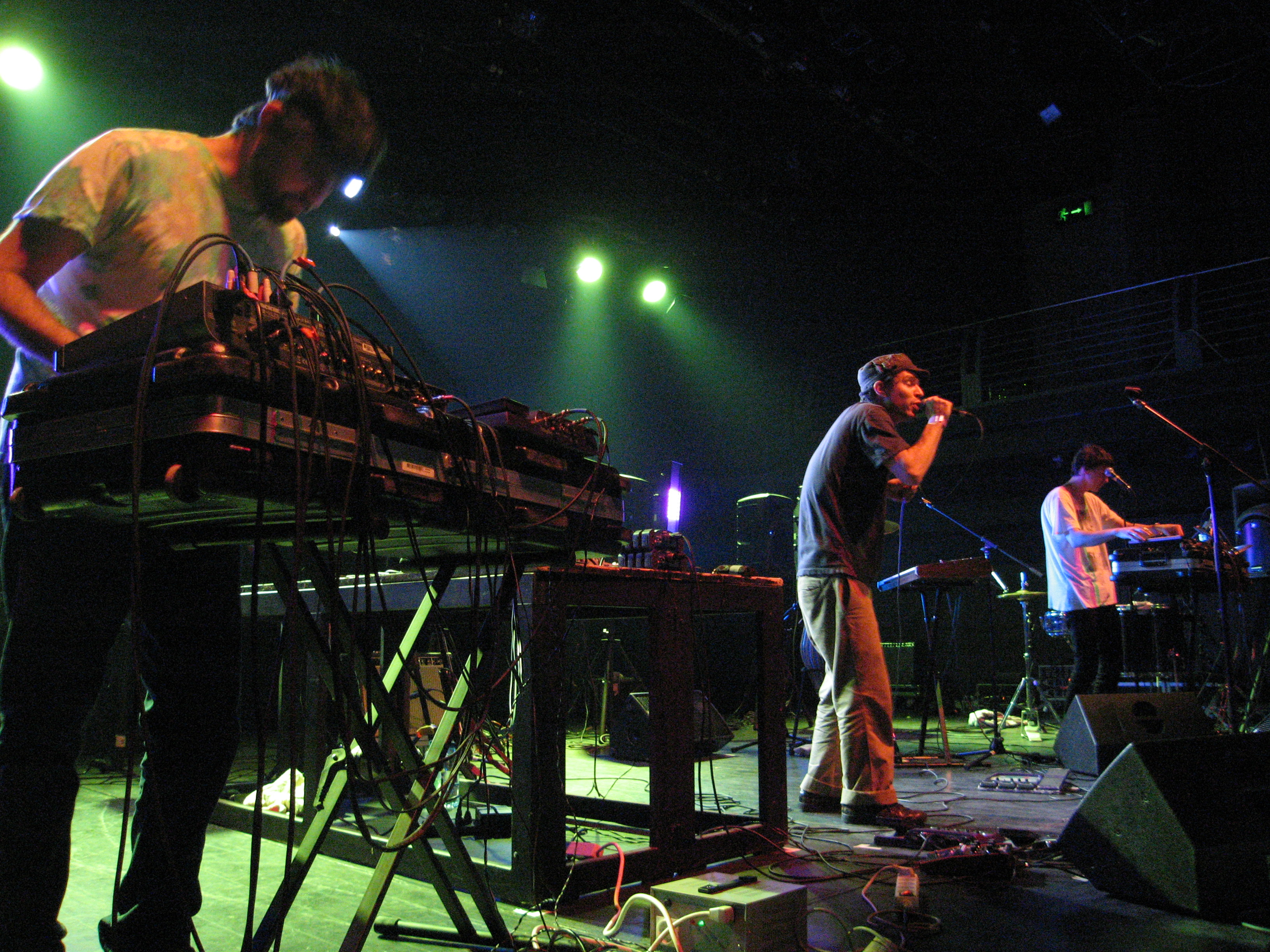
Performing in 2008

The band toured extensively throughout 2007, completing several American and European tours. Beginning in May 2007, the band debuted a brand new batch of post-Strawberry Jam live songs. These songs were written in an intense two-week session before the tour, months before the release of Strawberry Jam. On October 5, 2007, the band, in its full four-man line up (as opposed to its three-man lineup performances in 2007 and 2008) made their national television debut on Late Night with Conan O'Brien performing the song "#1" in support of Strawberry Jam.

On March 12, 2008, Water Curses EP leaked and was released on May 5, 2008. On April 9, the song "Water Curses" was released by itself digitally. In early 2008, sans Dibb, the collective entered the studio to record tracks for their eighth studio album. The album, entitled Merriweather Post Pavilion after the outdoor concert venue in Columbia, Maryland, was officially announced on the band's official website on October 5, 2008 and was released January 6, 2009. It became the band's most commercially successful album, peaking at number 13 on the US Billboard 200 and selling over 200,000 copies. The first single released from the album was "My Girls". The band set to tour throughout Europe and US in 2009, notably being one of the headlining acts at September's All Tomorrow's Parties Festival in New York City, where Lennox also performed a solo set as Panda Bear.

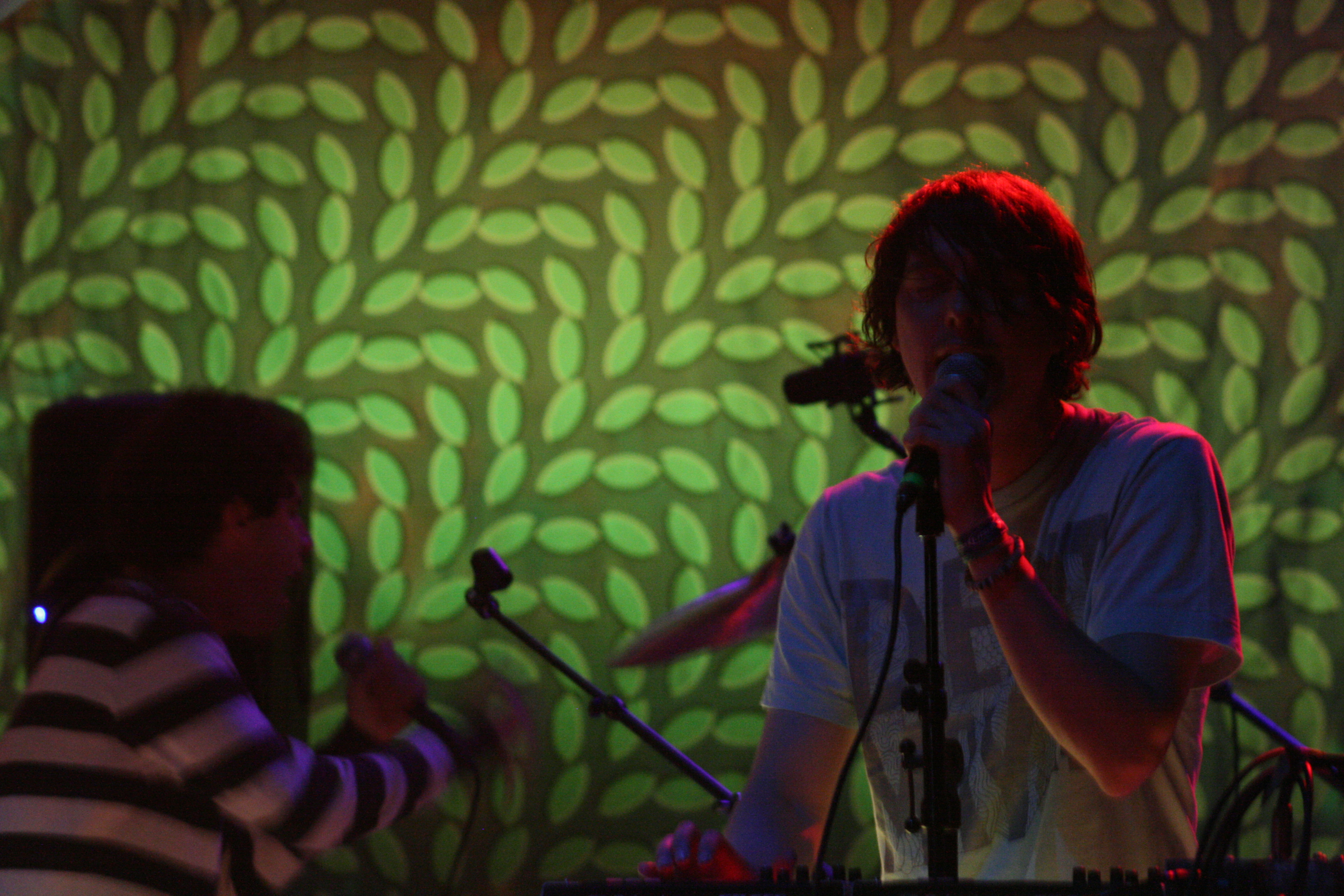
On tour promoting the album in June 2009

Starting with their first tour dates in early 2009, the band introduced "What Would I Want? Sky". This song was also part of a BBC Session recording, and the May 2009 tour saw the debut of "Bleed" - both of these songs later were included on their Fall Be Kind EP. On May 7, the band made their second television appearance, on the Late Show with David Letterman, performing the single "Summertime Clothes" from Merriweather Post Pavilion. The appearance included the regular three-man lineup indicative of their 2007–2009 tours, which excluded Josh Dibb. Four dancers draped in sheets also appeared on-stage behind the band, a first in their live performances. The video accompanied the release of the single on July 7, 2009, also featuring remixes by Zomby (Hyperdub), Dam-Funk (Stones Throw Records), and L.D. In an interview with Pitchfork, Portner announced the last single from the album would be "Brother Sport", released November 9 on vinyl with the live B-side "Bleeding".

The release of the Fall Be Kind EP followed on December 8, which included Merriweather leftovers "Graze" and "I Think I Can", along with "What Would I Want? Sky", containing the first legal Grateful Dead sample. Also included were "On A Highway" and "Bleed".

=== 2010–present ===
==== Oddsac ====
For four years, the band had been working on Oddsac, a visual record, with Danny Perez, who directed music videos for the band's "Who Could Win a Rabbit" and "Summertime Clothes" singles. The movie featured visuals which were developed and edited simultaneously with the music they recorded for it. Panda Bear stated they would like to "create a movie that would have visuals similar to what somebody would see if they closed their eyes while listening to Animal Collective's music". Weitz further added that "it's the most experimental stuff we've ever done." According to Portner, "Maybe here and there, in our minds, there's some weird narratives going on. The whole thing cohesively doesn't have one narrative; it's more of a visual or psychedelic thing. There are parts that are almost completely abstract, and there are parts that are little bit more live-action."

The film premiered at the 2010 Sundance Film Festival on January 26. Oddsac was screened in theaters in North America and Europe in spring 2010, followed by a DVD release in August.

In January 2010, LAS Magazine posted an article about alternative music financing that points out Deakin's initiative to have fans pay for a trip to perform at Mali's Festival au Désert.

Aside from touring New Zealand and Australia in December 2009, the band planned a break from their two years of touring to focus more on creating and writing music. On November 13, Panda Bear announced a small European tour of his solo material in early 2010.

On March 4, 2010, Animal Collective collaborated once again with Danny Perez in the audio-visual performance piece Transverse Temporal Gyrus at the Solomon R. Guggenheim Museum in New York City, celebrating its 50th anniversary. Two years later, it was announced that a collage of studio and live recordings of music from the project would be released as a 12" vinyl LP on April 21 for Record Store Day 2012.

==== Centipede Hz and Painting With ====
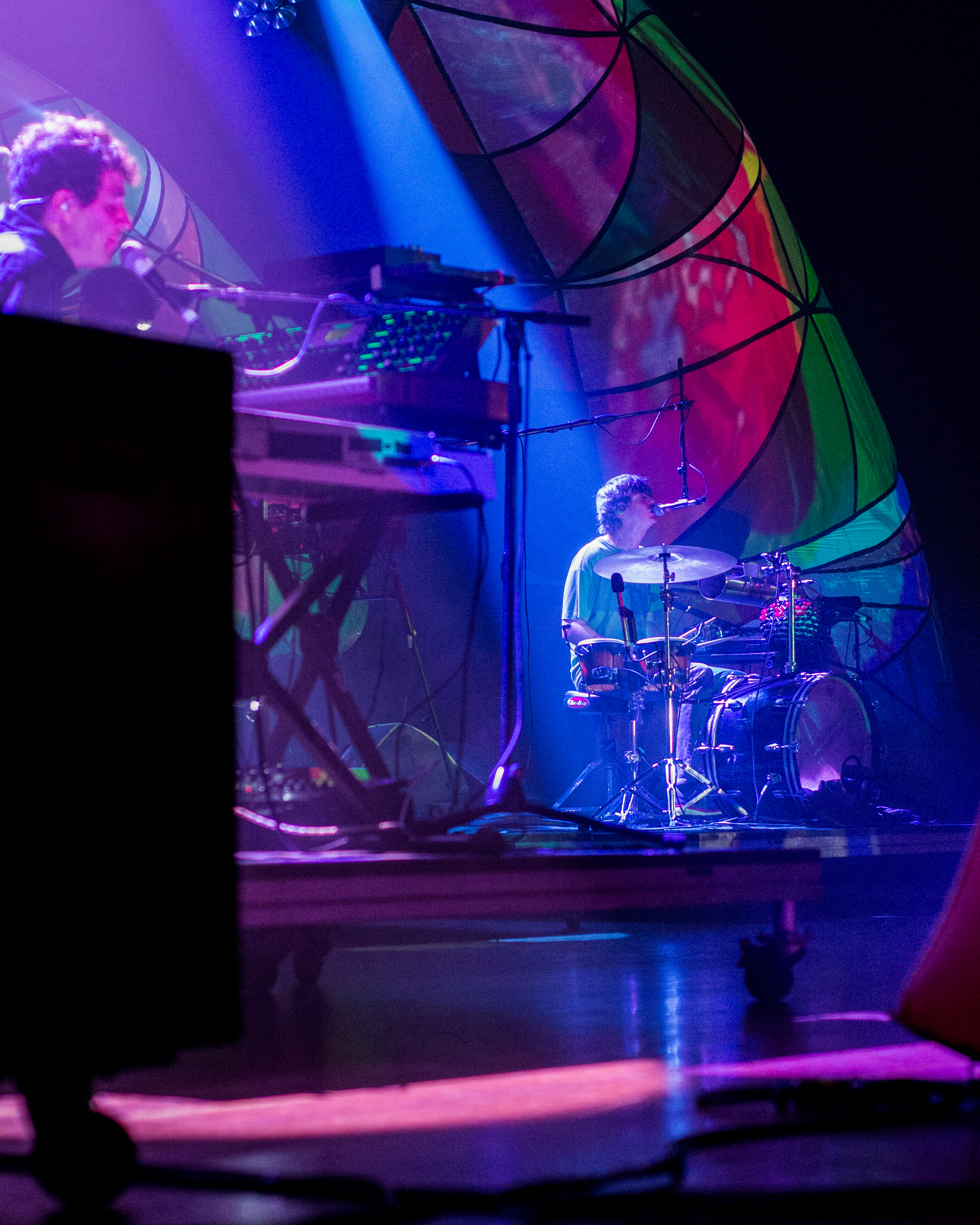
Animal Collective performing in October 2013

During several interviews in the second half of 2010, Lennox and Portner mentioned plans for Animal Collective's next album, including writing all together in the same location and the possibility of recording the new songs before taking them on tour, neither of which had happened for a long time. Portner revealed in October that the band would move back to Baltimore to write music there.

Near the end of October 2010, All Tomorrow's Parties announced that Animal Collective would be curating and headlining their UK festival in May 2011. It was confirmed in late November 2010 that Deakin would be rejoining the group for this show as well as the rest of the shows of their new tour. Before starting their first European tour of 2011, all four members of the band had a short tour of California leading up to an appearance at the Coachella Music Festival. At the shows, the band mostly played their newly written songs that were yet to be recorded.

On April 18 it was announced that Animal Collective would have a concert on July 9, 2011 at Merriweather Post Pavilion, the namesake of their eighth studio album.

During this period, the members of Animal Collective were invited by Maryland Film Festival to share a favorite film with an audience. On the evening of May 6, 2011, Avey Tare, Geologist, and Deakin presented a rare 35mm print of the 1983 Shaw Brothers production The Boxer's Omen in the historic Charles Theatre, and noted that another favorite film of the group was House.

Portner, in an interview for Madison, revealed that they had just finished writing sessions and that they intended to start full recording sessions in January 2012 for the next album. "We just finished another two weeks of writing sessions and put together five new songs," he said, noting that the crew planned to begin full recording sessions in January. "We're really excited about this record... and it's been really fun jamming with those guys again". On May 6, 2012, they announced the release of a 7" through Domino Records, entitled "Honeycomb" / "Gotham". Both tracks were immediately made available to stream through their website. One week later, Animal Collective released a video on their website indicating that the album Centipede Hz would be released in September 2012.

On September 1, 2015, the band announced a live album, titled Live at 9:30, released as a limited 3 disc LP and on digital platforms on September 4, 2015.

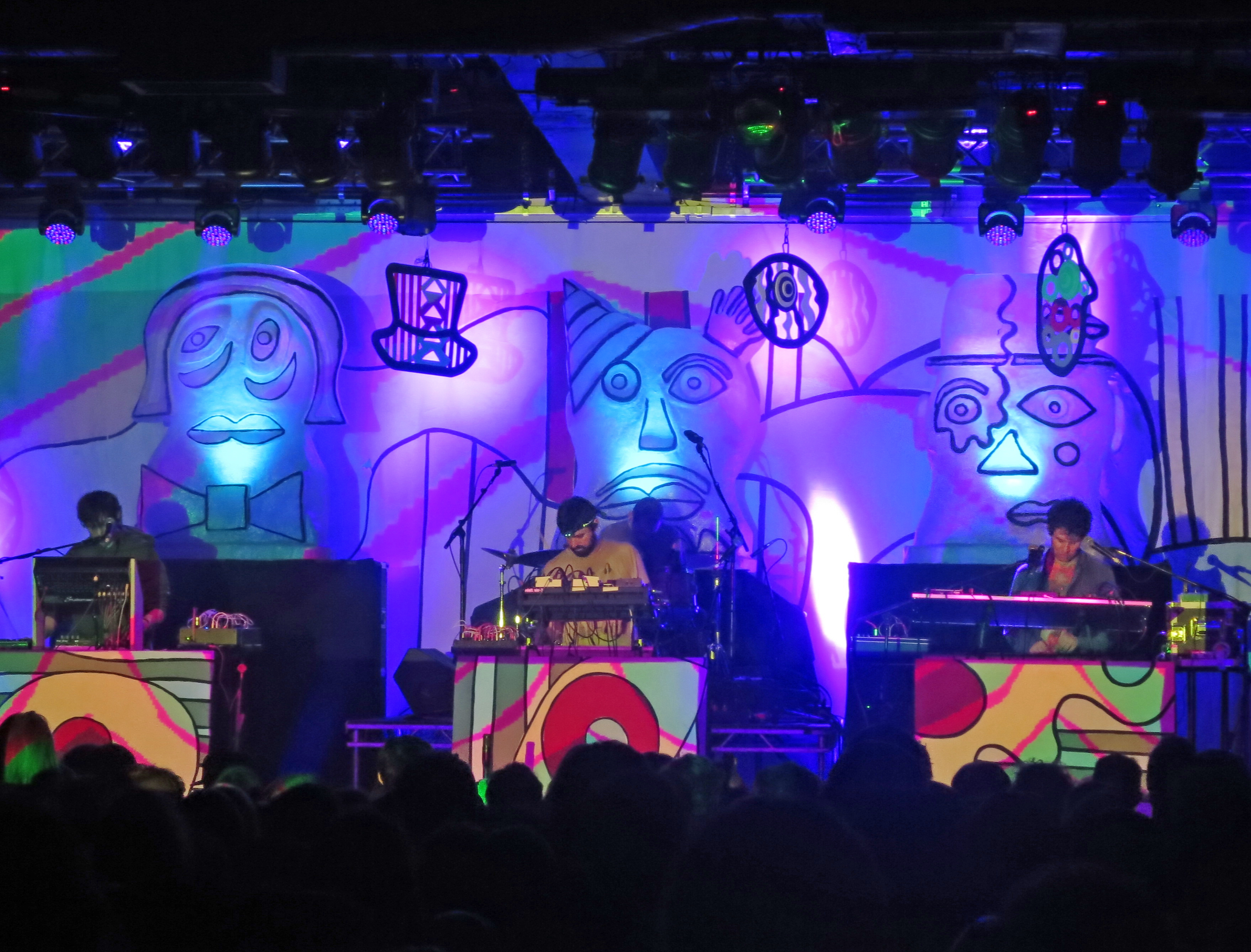
On tour for Painting With, 2017

On July 15, 2015, EastWest Studios announced that the band had finished recording a new album in their Studio 3 room. On November 25, the album was reportedly named Painting With, and debuted over the speakers of Baltimore/Washington International Airport, playing on loop until the evening. Tare confirmed that "FloriDada", the impending single from the album, would be released on November 30. The album was released in February 2016. On November 16, the band released "Mountain Game", a song that was rejected for the Red Dead Redemption soundtrack.

On February 14, 2017, the band announced the release of The Painters EP later that week on the 17th. It features two songs recorded during the Painting With sessions, as well as two songs recorded for the EP, "Kinda Bonkers" and a cover of Martha and the Vandellas' "Jimmy Mack".

On March 21, the band announced via their Instagram page their plans to release the Meeting of the Waters EP on Record Store Day 2017. It was recorded live in Brazil by Avey Tare and Geologist in 2016. The process of recording this EP was featured on the first episode of "Earthworks" on Viceland.

==== Tangerine Reef ====
On March 19, 2018, Animal Collective announced a tour where Portner and Lennox would play 2004's Sung Tongs in full. This was following a performance in 2017 for Pitchfork's 21st birthday where the duo also played the album live, and a two-night residency at the Music Box in New Orleans where Portner, Dibb, and Weitz played "site-specific music" with three accompanying musicians.

On July 16, 2018, the band announced the audiovisual album Tangerine Reef, which was released on August 17, 2018.

==== Time Skiffs and Isn't It Now? ====
The group featuring all four members embarked on a short tour in late 2019 performing new material. Production of a new album with all members participating began in early 2020 but was halted by the COVID-19 pandemic. Work resumed later in the year, done remotely from the member's respective homes, with a goal of a 2021 release date.

In 2020, 2 Nights, a collection of archival live recordings from 2001 and 2002, was released on the band's Bandcamp page in June. The records' profits were donated to Climate Justice Alliance and Deep South Center for Environmental Justice. On July 2, the group announced a digital reissue of the majority of their back catalogue to Bandcamp, alongside the release of a new EP, Bridge to Quiet. Along with the reissue of their back catalogue, the band officially changed the cover of People to remove the 'mammy' and changed the name of Here Comes the Indian to Ark.

Animal Collective (specifically members Deakin and Geologist) contributed the soundtrack for Marnie Ellen Hertzler's debut film Crestone. In the same year, all four members of the group created an original soundtrack for the 2022 film The Inspection directed by Elegance Bratton.

On February 4, 2022, the group released Time Skiffs via Domino. The announcement corresponded with the release of "Prester John", the album's lead single. The band later released the singles "Walker" and "Strung with Everything", with the latter accompanied by a music video created by Abby Portner, band member Avey Tare's sister. The final single to be released was "We Go Back".

On June 26, 2023, the group released the 22-minute song "Defeat", both digitally and as a 12-inch vinyl record, as the lead single from their next album. On July 24, the group announced the album would be titled Isn't It Now? and revealed its album art and track listing. Like the previous album, Isn't It Now? was released by Domino on September 29.

Deakin and Geologist both created an original soundtrack for the 2025 film Jetty directed by Sam Fleischner.

In November 2025, the group re-issued Feels for the album's 20th anniversary, including additional B-sides, demos and live recordings. In October 2026, the band performed four live shows, their first as a quartet since 2022, as part of Feels' 20th anniversary, two at the Knockdown Center in Queens, New York City, and a further two at The Fonda Theatre in Los Angeles.

== Artistry and musical style ==
Portner, Lennox, Weitz, and Dibb began as lo-fi indie rock musicians who, by high school, had amassed individual bodies of work recorded on cassette tapes. Influenced by horror film soundtracks and 20th century classical music, along with a shared passion for vocal harmony the group progressed to "walls of drones with guitars and delay pedals and us screaming into mics," in Portner's words. In college, Weitz and Portner listened to avant-garde records while Lennox explored electronic music, a style he took interest in after listening to The Orb's UFOrb (1992) in boarding school. When the group (sans Dibb) convened in 2000 after the recording of Spirit They've Gone, Spirit They've Vanished, they conducted improvisational music sessions which used vintage synthesizers, acoustic guitars and household objects. In 2005, Lennox spoke of it as a defining era: "everything since then has been a variation of what we explored that summer." The following album, Danse Manatee (2001), drew from freak folk, noise rock, ambient drone, and psychedelia. Genres that have been used to label the band include experimental pop, psychedelic, electronic, experimental, indie rock, avant-pop, art rock, freak folk, noise pop, neo-psychedelia, and psychedelic pop.

About the word "Animal" in their name, Panda Bear said,

It sounds kind of lame, but we're all really big fans of animals. At the time, we were thinking along the lines of animals as beings that act purely instinctually...kind of the opposite of a "collective" in that way. Musically, it was about not making decisions based on knowledge or reason. We wanted to work with music on an emotional level, not on an intellectual level. That's where it comes from.

Lennox compared Portner's songwriting to the songwriting of Fleetwood Mac's Lindsey Buckingham. Portner believes they're "one of the greatest...in terms of older bands or pop bands...a song like 'That's All for Everyone' is really influential to me...it blew me away the first time I heard it." For Centipede Hz (2012), Weltz created an "inspirational mix" of songs which influenced the album's making; the playlist included content by Pink Floyd, Portishead, We the People, Milton Nascimento, Zé Ramalho, Eddie & Ernie, Gandalf, Catherine Ribeiro + Alpes, Silver Apples, Dorothy Ashby, 13th Floor Elevators, Apryl Fool, and others.

Animal Collective are often compared to the American rock band the Beach Boys, a vocal group who performed original songs written by their co-founder and leader Brian Wilson, himself inspired by barbershop music and his use of psychedelic drugs. The comparisons led Thorin Klosowski of the publication Westword to negatively refer to Animal Collective's music as "two Beach Boys records [playing] at the same time". Animal Collective responded to the initial comparisons by recording "College", an "anti-Beach Boys" song from the album Sung Tongs. (Note: In a 2008 interview, Wilson was asked his feelings about Animal Collective, but did not give an opinion.) Lennox has expressed reverence for their album Pet Sounds (1966) and reluctance on being compared to the Beach Boys. (Note: In a review of the album Strawberry Jam, Evan L. Hanlon called Animal Collective a true experimental pop group that expands the conventions of pop music through Wilson's influence, in contrast to contemporaries "who always comes off as just another Beach Boys tribute". AllMusic described Animal Collective's style of vocal harmonies as a "warped" interpretation of the Beach Boys' style. Writer Richard Goldstein named the Beach Boys' "Fall Breaks and Back to Winter" (1967) the origin of Animal Collective's sound.) In 2015, Animal Collective recorded their album Painting With in the same studio space once used by Wilson for the recording of Pet Sounds and Smile.

== Members ==
- Avey Tare (David Portner) – vocals, guitar, synthesizer, sequencer, keys, piano, bass guitar, percussion, autoharp
  - name comes from "tearing" apart the name "Davey" and is unrelated to the word "avatar"
- Panda Bear (Noah Lennox) – vocals, drums, percussion, samples, synthesizer, electronics, guitar
  - named for the panda he drew on tapes he made for friends of the first set of songs he ever wrote
- Deakin (Josh Dibb) – guitar, synthesizer, vocals, keys, percussion, sequencer, sampler, drum pad, bass guitar
  - name comes from letters he used to write to other members under the pseudonym Conrad Deacon (Note: He has used different spellings of the name on different albums: "Deaken" on Here Comes the Indian, "Deakin" on Feels and "Deacon" on Strawberry Jam and the single "Grass" Dibb went back to the moniker "Deakin" for the Centipede Hz album. Having been absent from the band's tours since early 2007, he began a solo tour in 2010 using the spelling "Deakin" at the request of fellow Baltimorean musician Dan Deacon, in order to avoid confusion.)
- Geologist (Brian Weitz) – electronics, samples, minidiscs, synthesizer, piano, vocoder, hurdy-gurdy, percussion
  - named for the headlamp he wears in order to see the electronics during live shows, and from a friend mishearing his major in college (marine biology)

Former touring musicians

- Jeremy Hyman – drums (2016–2017, 2021 as opening act)

=== Contributions ===
Animal Collective contributions
Musician	Avey Tare	Panda Bear	Geologist	Deakin
Primary albums
Spirit They're Gone, Spirit They've Vanished	check	check		
Danse Manatee	check	check	check	
Hollinndagain	check	check	check	
Campfire Songs	check	check		check
Here Comes the Indian	check	check	check	check
Sung Tongs	check	check		
Feels	check	check	check	check
Strawberry Jam	check	check	check	check
Merriweather Post Pavilion	check	check	check	
Oddsac	check	check	check	check
Centipede Hz	check	check	check	check
Painting With	check	check	check	
Tangerine Reef	check		check	check
Time Skiffs	check	check	check	check
Isn't It Now?	check	check	check	check
Soundtrack albums
Crestone (Original Score)			check	check
The Inspection (Original Motion Picture Soundtrack)	check	check	check	check
Jetty (Original Motion Picture Soundtrack)			check	check
Extended plays
Prospect Hummer	check	check	(Note: Only appears on "Baleen Sample")	check
People	check	check	check	check
Water Curses	check	check	check	check
Fall Be Kind	check	check	check	
Keep + Animal Collective	check	check	check	check
Transverse Temporal Gyrus	check	check	check	check
Monkey Been to Burn Town	check	check	check	check
New Psycho Actives Vol. 1	check		check	
The Painters	check	check	check	
Meeting of the Waters	check		check	
New Psycho Actives Vol. 2	check		check	
Bridge to Quiet	check	check	check	check

== Discography ==
=== Studio albums ===
- Spirit They're Gone, Spirit They've Vanished (2000) (as Avey Tare and Panda Bear)
- Danse Manatee (2001) (as Avey Tare, Panda Bear and Geologist)
- Campfire Songs (2003) (as Campfire Songs)
- Here Comes the Indian (2003) (reissued as "Ark")
- Sung Tongs (2004)
- Feels (2005)
- Strawberry Jam (2007)
- Merriweather Post Pavilion (2009)
- Centipede Hz (2012)
- Painting With (2016)
- Time Skiffs (2022)
- Isn't It Now? (2023)

=== Visual albums ===
- Oddsac (2010)
- Tangerine Reef (2018)
