= Geologist (musician) =

American musician

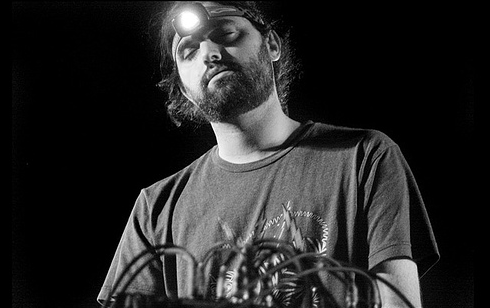
- Geologist performing live

Background information
- Born: Brian Ross Weitz; March 26, 1979 (age 47); Baltimore, Maryland, U.S.
- Occupations: Musician, environmental lobbyist
- Instruments: Sampler, vocals, percussion, synthesizer, hurdy gurdy

Brian Ross Weitz (/ˈweɪts/ WAYTS, born March 26, 1979), also known by his stage name Geologist, is an American musician best known as a member of the experimental pop group Animal Collective. He provides electronic sound manipulations and samples for the band.

Weitz grew up in Philadelphia and Baltimore and lives in Washington, DC. His nickname comes from a friend mistaking his major in college, as well as the headlamp he wears in order to see his electronic equipment during live shows.

== Animal Collective ==
Geologist attended the Park School of Baltimore where he met future Animal Collective bandmates David Portner (aka Avey Tare) and Josh Dibb (aka Deakin). Avey Tare, Geologist and Deakin first started an indie-rock band called "Automine" with two other schoolmates. Deakin introduced his childhood friend Noah Lennox (aka Panda Bear) to Avey Tare and Geologist. Throughout their high school years and winter/summer college breaks, the four of them played music in different variations and often solo, swapping homemade recordings and sharing ideas.

Geologist went on to study at Columbia University, while Avey Tare went to NYU, Panda Bear to Boston University, and Deakin to Brandeis University. Avey Tare recorded tracks with Panda Bear which eventually became Spirit They're Gone, Spirit They've Vanished, which was released under "Avey Tare and Panda Bear" in August 2000. After Panda Bear and Deakin both left school and moved to New York in 2000, the group's music became more collaborative, and Avey and Panda began playing clubs around New York. Geologist soon began performing with the group who eventually became "Animal Collective." He first appeared on their 2001 release Danse Manatee, and has contributed to every Animal Collective recording to date, except for their 2004 Sung Tongs LP and their 2003 Campfire Songs LP (though he was present during the recording of the latter to operate the MiniDisc recorders). Before that time, Geologist had gone to Arizona for graduate school.

When asked about his personal musical influences, he says "I was always inspired by horror soundtracks, things that use unconventional sounds and textures as music. I'm interested in how abstract sounds can have the same impact on the listener as traditional musical sounds."

== Other musical projects ==
As well as performing various DJ sets, Geologist has released the track "Jailhouse" on Animal Collective's Keep Cassette, "Stretching Songs for Spring" on a digital split with Avey Tare entitled New Psycho Actives Vol. 1 and created the soundtrack for the Morphologic Studios short film Man O War. In April of 2018 he released the limited edition cassette Live in the Land of the Sky - his first proper solo release.

Geologist collaborated with Doug Shaw (credited as "D.S.") on the album A Shaw Deal, released in January 2025. The singles "Loose Gravel" and "Route 9 Falls" were released on January 13, 2025 ahead of the album.

In 2025, Weitz formed the instrumental psychedelic rock trio Motherfuckers JMB & Co. with former Gwar drummer Jim Thomson and Marc Minsker. The group released its debut album, Music Excitement Action Beauty, in 2025.

He also hosts a monthly radio show on NTS Radio called The O'Brien System.

== Personal life ==
In addition to his musical career, Weitz also worked on ocean conservation and environmental policy. He has a BA from Columbia University in Environmental Science, and an MPA in Environmental Policy from Columbia University's School of International and Public Affairs.

Weitz was married on Halloween in 2009. He and his wife had a son in August 2010.

== Musical equipment ==
- MiniDisc – sample playback
- Kaoss Pad – effects
- Roland SP-555 – sampler
- Roland SP-404 – sampler
- Moog Taurus 3 Pedals
- Moog Sub 37
- Moog Little Phatty

== Discography ==
- New Psycho Actives Vol. 1 (2015) (with Avey Tare)
- Live in the Land of the Sky (2018)
- Tucson Tacks/Super (2023)
- A Shaw Deal (2025) (with D.S.)
- Music Excitement Action Beauty (2025) (with Motherfuckers JMB & Co.)
- Can I Get a Pack of Camel Lights? (2026)
- The Sirens (2026) (with Kyle Simon)
