= Tomboy (album) =

Studio album by Panda Bear
- Released: April 12, 2011
- Genres: Psychedelia; ambient pop; bedroom pop; electro-pop
- Length: 50:00
- Label: Paw Tracks
- Producers: Panda Bear; Sonic Boom

Panda Bear chronology
Person Pitch (2007)	Tomboy (2011)	Mr Noah (2014)

Singles from Tomboy
- 1. "Tomboy / Slow Motion" Released: July 2010; 2. "You Can Count on Me / Alsatian Darn" Released: September 2010; 3. "Last Night at the Jetty / Drone" Released: December 2010; 4. "Surfer's Hymn" Released: March 2011

Tomboy is the fourth studio album by American musician Panda Bear (aka Noah Lennox), released on April 4, 2011, initially as an online stream and later physically. It was mixed by UK musician Sonic Boom. In contrast to the sample-based composition of the previous Panda Bear album Person Pitch (2007), the recording of Tomboy features a stripped-down sound built around guitar processed through Korg M3-M workstation modules.

The album peaked at No. 29 on the Billboard 200. It was included on 2011 best-of lists by publications such as Pitchfork and Rolling Stone.

== Background ==
Following the success of his previous album Person Pitch (2007) and Animal Collective's Merriweather Post Pavilion (2009), Lennox was looking to move beyond the restrictions of composing with a sampler and record something "with a heavy focus on guitar and rhythm," influenced by bands like Nirvana and the White Stripes; he later qualified that these artists' influence should not be taken too literally, as "their sound is over-driven and buzzed out and that wasn’t something I was really into. But […] it was exciting to see that from a simple set up, these bands can crank out some really heavy jams. I think I just took inspiration from that kind of approach.” He also mentioned being inspired by the singing of "Frank Sinatra or crooner guys. It’s a really singular thing, but really powerful, too."

In contrast to Person Pitch, which was recorded in his well-lit apartment overlooking Lisbon, Tomboy was recorded in a basement studio where "there was no light, it was really dark and it was kind of lonely." During the sessions, Lennox ran his guitar through a Korg M3-M workstation module, which is commonly part of a synthesizer. He explained that he "had this idea of a triangle where the voice was at the top, some sort of guitar element on one side, and then some sort of really basic rhythm on the other side. The song "Benfica" is a reference to the Portuguese football club S.L. Benfica.

=== Production ===
In an interview with NYCTaper in September 2010, Josh Dibb of Animal Collective revealed that he and bandmate Dave Portner had been requested to mix the album on its completion. However, due to the fact that both of them were busy at the time, it was later reported that the album was being mixed by Sonic Boom, former Spacemen 3 member and producer of MGMT's second album, Congratulations.

Lennox noted that his original mix of the album "sampled a lot of these little children’s movies that my daughter was watching at the time […] I just remember hearing this sonic clutter in the house all the time." He noted that Sonic Boom's mix made these less obvious but "I’m hoping that those sorts of things will make it feel a little more weird, like a broadcast coming from space."

== Release ==
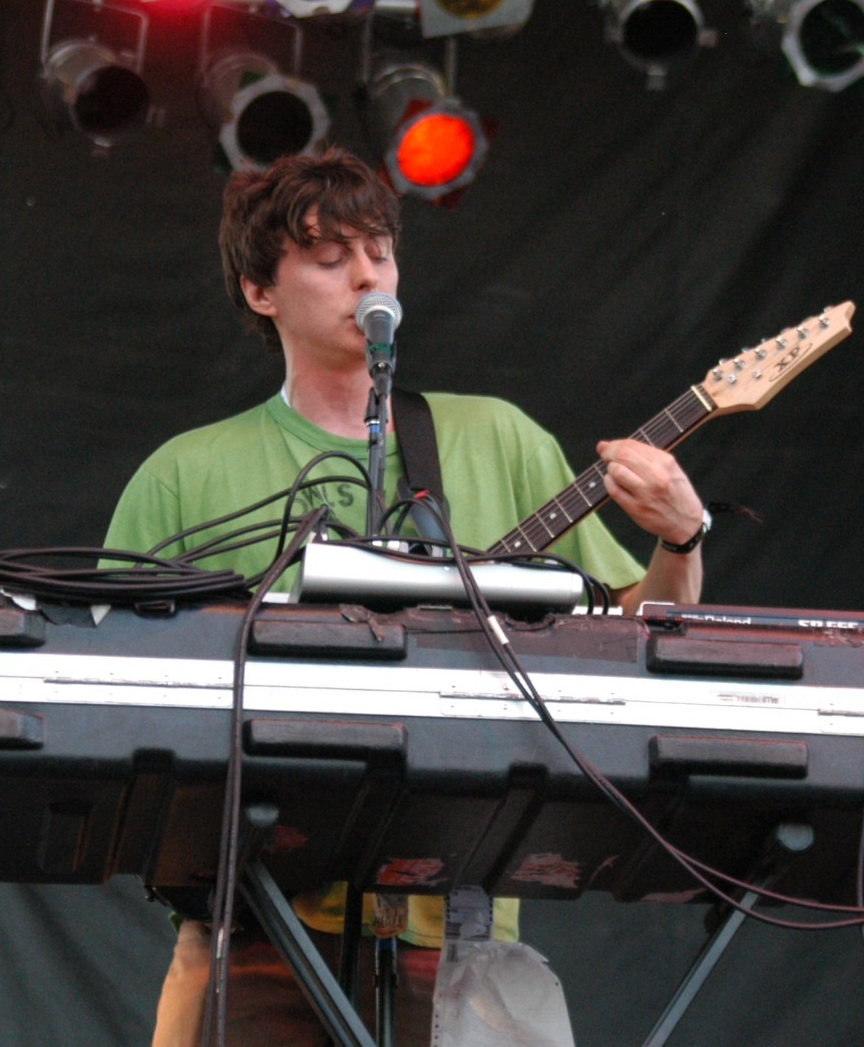
Panda Bear performing at the Pitchfork Music Festival in 2010

Lennox had mentioned that Tomboy's release would be similar to that of Person Pitch in that several singles would be released on different labels prior to its release, "Doing the singles helps me focus on every song and also helps me move along in the process." The first single, "Tomboy" was released on Paw Tracks July 13, 2010, with a digital release following a week later. The first and only pressing sold out quickly. Another two singles, "You Can Count on Me" and "Last Night at the Jetty", were released later in the year on Domino and FatCat respectively. "Surfer's Hymn", the last of the four planned singles, was released by Kompakt on March 28 with a remix by London musician Actress. According to his website, Tomboy was slated for release "near the end of 2010". The singles feature artwork by Noah's fellow Jane member, Scott Mou.

On January 14, 2011, Lennox announced via Facebook that the album would be released on April 19 of that year, and it was later moved up a week to April 12 so it would be available on Record Store Day. Two listening parties for the album were held in New York City on February 16, and another two in Los Angeles on February 28. The first 1000 pressings of the vinyl were printed on translucent wax, and initial copies of the album came with a download card redeemable for a free digital copy of Live at Governor's Island, a recording of a New York show by Panda Bear from September 11, 2010. A limited edition box set for the album was released on November 1, 2011, with all proceeds going to the American Cancer Society. It contains four LPs featuring: the Tomboy full length with slightly different mixing on two LPs, Noah's single mixes on one LP, and several Tomboy unreleased instrumentals and a cappellas, plus "The Preakness" and a 16-page art booklet.

== Reception ==
Professional ratings
Aggregate scores
Source	Rating
AnyDecentMusic?	7.5/10
Metacritic	77/100
Review scores
Source	Rating
AllMusic	4/5 stars
The A.V. Club	A−
Entertainment Weekly	B+
The Guardian	4/5 stars
Los Angeles Times	3/4 stars
Mojo	6/10
Pitchfork	8.5/10
Q	3/5 stars
Rolling Stone	3.5/5 stars
Slant Magazine	6/10

Rolling Stone stated that "the rapturous beauty on the Animal Collective singer's fourth solo disc is built on basic stuff: Lennox's choirboy tenor – multiplied into billowing harmonies – and sweet melodies," but called it "a bit less stunning" than Person Pitch. The Guardian called the album "dense, oppressive and utterly hypnotic," and praised Lennox's "honeyed, glowing vocal harmonies, repeated and repeated until they induce not a headache, but a calming trance." Entertainment Weekly stated that the album "stretches out Beach Boys-style pop into a kind of slo-mo sound installation. The woozy, reverb-rich result makes for great headphone swimming." According to The Quietus, the album reflected "a more streamlined assimilation of all the classic Panda Bear touchstones: 60s psych-pop, drone, techno and folk," stating that 'by shedding many of his more irksome tropes, he lets his true craftsmanship shine through."

Paste noted that the album "scales back on many of the infectious samples that made his third LP such an appealing record, instead inviting us into his own lush ambient-pop landscapes," but cautioned that Lennox occasionally "succumbs to the weight of his somewhat ambivalent, drudging experiments." Slant Magazine claimed that "it’s difficult not to be slightly disappointed by the despondent nature of Lennox’s fourth solo album," adding that "though rich and dreamlike, Panda Bear’s latest is too tedious, too bloated, and far too serious to be anything more than an above-average record."

The "One Thirty BPM" website gave "Last Night at the Jetty" a positive response with an 8/10 and proclaimed it 'succeeds'. Pitchfork would list the song as the 43rd best track of 2011.

=== Accolades ===
Pitchfork placed the album at number 32 on its list of the "Top 50 albums of 2011". Rolling Stone placed the album at number 37 on its list of the "Top 50 albums of 2011".

The track "Slow Motion" has been well received by Pitchfork Media and was tagged as 'Best New Music'. The song is also at number 60 in Pitchfork Media's Top 100 Tracks of 2010. Gorilla vs. Bear blog ranked "Alsatian Darn" the 7th best track of 2010 in their "Songs of 2010" list.

== Legacy ==
"Last Night at the Jetty" inspired a cocktail of the same name, published by Punch Drink Magazine in 2024.

"Slow Motion" was later used in the Season 9 episode of CSI: Miami "Blood Sugar" aired December 12, 2010.

== Track listing ==
No.	Title	Length
1.	"You Can Count on Me"	2:21
2.	"Tomboy"	4:23
3.	"Slow Motion"	4:36
4.	"Surfer's Hymn"	4:31
5.	"Last Night at the Jetty"	4:29
6.	"Drone"	4:01
7.	"Alsatian Darn"	4:16
8.	"Scheherazade"	3:53
9.	"Friendship Bracelet"	5:54
10.	"Afterburner"	6:50
11.	"Benfica"	4:11

Expanded Edition bonus track
No.	Title	Length
12.	"The Preakness" (positioned between "Drone" and "Alsatian Darn")	3:32

== Charts ==
Chart performance for Tomboy
Chart (2011)	Peak position
Scottish Albums (Official Charts)	74
UK Albums (Official Charts)	62
UK Album Downloads (Official Charts)	92
UK Independent Albums (Official Charts)	10
US Billboard 200	29
US Top Album Sales (Billboard)	29
US Indie Store Album Sales (Billboard)	5
US Top Vinyl Albums (Billboard)	1
