= Abby Portner =

American designer (born 1980)

- Born: Abigail Portner; August 13, 1980 (age 46)
- Education: Parsons The New School for Design
- Known for: Drawing, album art, music video, music
- Notable work: Sung Tongs artwork, Down There artwork, In the Flowers video, Lucky 1 video
- Website: Abby Portner Blogspot

Drawlings
- Origin: Baltimore, Maryland
- Instruments: Sampler, keyboards, drums
- Years active: 2006 – present
- Label: Paw Tracks
- Website: Drawlings MySpace

Abigail Portner (born August 13, 1980) is an American visual artist, designer, music video director and musician in the bands Rings and Hex Message, and solo under the name Drawlings. She currently lives and works out of Savannah, Georgia.

== Visual art ==
Abby Portner's work is closely connected to her friends and especially to her brother David Portner's band Animal Collective. She started to make tour posters when they were still in High School together in Baltimore, Maryland. She later moved to New York City to attend Parsons School for Design, but continued to make record covers and still designs shirts, tour posters and merchandise for the band. For Animal Collective's album Merriweather Post Pavilion, she contributed a music video for the song In the Flowers. In the summer of 2010 she built a live set for two Animal Collective shows in Prospect Park in New York City that contained large scale paintings and sculptures of jellyfish, tiki men, moving sharks and shooting water. The work was handmade by Portner in small parts with the help of friends in a working space in Bushwick, New York City, and put together on stage.

Besides drawing for Animal Collective, Portner worked on a wide range of visual art projects, including tattoo designing and cartoons. In the end of 2008 she designed skateboards for the Ohio-based brand Alien Workshop. In mid-2010 Portner worked as a guest artist for the animated series The Velvet Mouse Show.

In early 2010, The Fader magazine featured Portner in the 65th issue with some artwork and a portrait. In addition, an interview and a slideshow with the artist's work was posted on the magazine's website.

According to herself, the inspiration for her imagery comes from sources like old photos of her childhood, children's magazines and Disney World. She points out the motif of play and playfulness as the main theme of her work. Accordingly, recurrent themes in her drawings are animals, masked children, Christmas and Halloween. In addition to this "childlike" approach Portner adds a dark, melancholic and often eerie undertone to her figures:

It's like how I can't draw a child without it looking scary. I can't make a song that doesn't sound like a haunted house. Whether it's a song or a drawing, it's coming from the same place inside.

In 2014, she directed the music video for "If You Were Still Around" song by John Cale. In 2017, she directed the music video for John Cale's cover of Hallelujah.

== Music ==
Portner joined Nina Mehta and Kate Rosko of the New York-based band First Nation in June 2006 as a drummer, shortly after Melissa Livaudis of Telepathe left the band. With Mehta and Rosko she started to write new material as well as playing shows around New York City and at the Midi Festival in France in August 2006. After changing the band's name to Rings, they eventually recorded the album, Black Habit in March 2008 at Rove Studios in Kentucky, along with Kristin Anna Valtysdottir who produced the record. As the drummer of Rings and Among Natives, another musical project of hers, Portner was one of 77 drummers participating in the art project 77 Boadrum in Summer 2007. A year later, she was also part of the follow-up 88 Boadrum. In the meantime, Portner had also joined the four-piece jam band Hex Message.

In the summer of 2008 Portner started her solo music project Drawlings:

I kind of started it to relate my art to my music more and also express other things in my music that come out only when you are working solo. I guess it's more personal. I kinda had a weird year so I wanted to make Drawlings to express some of that. Even the name is personal. That is how I say "drawing", with an "L" and I have done it since I was little and it's never changed.

Since then, she played solo shows mostly in New York City and Los Angeles and opened for artists like Animal Collective, Deakin, Kría Brekkan, Foot Village and Angel Deradoorian, with her fellow Rings members joining her sometimes on stage. In May 2011, Portner played at All Tomorrow's Parties curated by Animal Collective in Minehead, England, along with Big Boi, Beach House, Atlas Sound, Gang Gang Dance and Paw Tracks bands such as Ariel Pink's Haunted Graffiti and Black Dice.

The only Drawlings release so far is the solo song "Wolfie's Christmas" on a 7-inch named "Be Good to Earth This Season" released on Paw Tracks in the end of 2008. In an interview in 2010, Portner announced that she plans on recording a Drawlings album in the following winter with her brother David Portner to release it on Paw Tracks in early 2011: "[...] I have a name for the record and the album art already realized. I just need to get the songs down."
