= Hollinndagain =

- One of many cover variants for the original 2002 pressing.

Live album by Avey Tare, Panda Bear and Geologist (Animal Collective)
- Released: June 28, 2002
- Recorded: February 9, and April 11 – June 3, 2001
- Genre: Experimental; electronic; noise
- Length: 41:43
- Label: St. Ives, Paw Tracks (2006 reissue)

Animal Collective chronology
Danse Manatee (2001)	Hollinndagain (2002)	Campfire Songs (2003)

Avey Tare chronology
Danse Manatee (2001)	Hollinndagain (2002)	Pullhair Rubeye (2007)

Panda Bear chronology
Danse Manatee (2001)	Hollinndagain (2002)	Young Prayer (2004)

Alternative cover
- Reissue cover

Professional ratings
Review scores
Source	Rating
AllMusic	3/5 stars
Pitchfork	8.1/10
Prefix Magazine	5/10

Hollinndagain is the first live album and second collaborative album by Avey Tare, Panda Bear and Geologist, released in 2002 on the label St. Ives. It was later retroactively classified as the first live album by their band Animal Collective.

Only 300 copies were initially made; each and every copy featured a unique cover, handmade by the band themselves. For several years it was a vinyl-only release; Animal Collective's own label, Paw Tracks, re-released the album on October 31, 2006, on both CD and vinyl. Although Hollinndagain is a live album, the group regard it as their third official album because it contained all new material at the time it was released, except "Lablakely Dress" which previously appeared on Danse Manatee. The title is garbled Icelandic for "Palace of the Day".

== Background ==
Hollinndagain is a collection of live material from around the time of the band's second album, Danse Manatee. The first three songs were recorded during a performance on New Jersey radio station WFMU; the final four were culled from live shows in New York, Nashville and Austin with Black Dice in the summer of 2001.

Geologist discussed the creation of sounds for Hollinndagain on the Collected Animals message board :

"We didn't use any samplers, just minidiscs. And we've only ever had 2 synths used in Animal Collective, the Roland SH-2 and the Juno-60. We were using both on that material back then… we used lots of pedals and effects processors too and made feedback loops.”

Geologist also explained why Hollinndagain material never made it to the studio on the Collected Animals message board.:

"i don't know if i remember the events well enough to point out a moment that would answer that. in my memory it just kind of happened that way. st. ives asked us to do one of their limited lp's and we had never done any studio versions of those songs so we decided to release those live versions because we thought they were sweet sounding, and did the songs justice. the wfmu radio session sounded great to us after we did it so that was a no brainer. as for why we never did studio versions of those songs, that i'm fuzzy about. we were playing them at shows around nyc for the first half of 2001, which was also the time we were recording and mixing danse manatee. so the hollindagain jams took up our live time and the danse manatee jams took up our recording time. i sort of remember some talk of recording pride fight and forest gospel and releasing an ep with those 2 and forest children risen and ahh good country. all four of those used similar styles of playing the acoustic guitar in a percussive way so they seemed to fit together in our heads. but that talk didn't go anywhere i guess. then we did the dice tour, and after that i took off to travel for the summer and when i got back we decided to start playing with all four of us there and just started working on new material. so the hollindagain songs just kind of left our minds and we never got around to them. the era seemed to have ended. the st. ives offer came after we had already started writing here comes the indian, and we thought it was a shame we never recorded or released any hollindgain jams so it offered us a sweet opportunity to do it."

"Pride and Fight" was later re-worked for live performances in 2016 and 2017.

== Track listing ==
Side one
No.	Title	Length
1.	"I See You Pan"	10:24
2.	"Pride and Fight"	11:24
Total length:		21:48

Side two
No.	Title	Length
1.	"Forest Gospel"	4:23
2.	"There's an Arrow"	3:04
3.	"Lablakely Dress"	5:23
4.	"Tell It to the Mountain"	4:37
5.	"Pumpkin Gets a Snakebite"	2:18
Total length:		19:45
