= Terrestrial Tones =

- Genres: Noise rock; experimental rock; post-rock; ambient noise; industrial; electronic; avant-garde; musique concrète
- Years active: 2004–2006
- Labels: Paw Tracks, UUAR, Psych-o-path Records
- Members: Dave Portner; Eric Copeland

Terrestrial Tones are Dave Portner (Avey Tare) of Animal Collective and Eric Copeland of Black Dice. The two were roommates who began recording together when both of their respective primary bands went on temporary hiatus in November 2004.

== Discography ==
=== Albums ===
- Blasted (2005, Psych-o-path Records)
- Oboroed/Circus Lives (2005, UUAR)
- Dead Drunk (2006, Paw Tracks)

=== EPs and singles ===
- "Bro's" (2006, Panda Bear single, contributed remix)
