= Young Prayer =

Studio album by Panda Bear
- Released: September 28, 2004
- Genre: Psychedelic folk
- Length: 28:08
- Label: Paw Tracks
- Producer: Rusty Santos, Animal Collective

Panda Bear chronology
Hollinndagain (2002)	Young Prayer (2004)	Person Pitch (2007)

Young Prayer is the second studio album by American experimental pop musician Panda Bear, released on September 28, 2004. It follows his debut solo album Panda Bear (1999). It is his first since co-founding Animal Collective.

== Background ==
None of the songs on the album have a title because Lennox wanted the album to be "one nugget of sound. I put the track markers in there just to separate the sections."

The songs were all written around the time of the death of Lennox' father. About this fact, Lennox said:

It was more a gift to my father when he was sick and I wanted to make him happy if I could and I wanted to cheer him up and I wanted to tell him that he’d done really great in his time. I was pretty fucked up but I wanted to keep going and I wanted to have strength and I suppose that comes out in the recording. I wouldn’t say it was therapeutic though, at least I never thought of it that way.

In another Interview, Lennox got into detail about this:

[...] he [his father] did get to hear the roughs of the album’s songs, if not the finished version. That was recorded in the room he actually died in, so it was especially intense. With Young Prayer, I wanted to tell him that he had taught me really well. I wanted to be like, ‘It’s been really good hanging out and learning from you, you’ve been a really good man and set a good example’.

The whole album was written in a very quick process and recorded with Animal Collective member Deakin in "two or three days or something."
According to the artist, it "is very classically influenced. All the weird baroque flourishes and stuff in terms of the way I’m singing. And that was definitely intentional, I set out to do something that sounded like that."
The album was produced and mixed entirely without Lennox by Rusty Santos and the rest of Animal Collective. Though it was changed quite a bit during the post-production, Lennox was "very happy with the way it sounded" when he received the result.

The album art was produced by Abby Portner, the sister of fellow Animal Collective member Dave Portner aka Avey Tare.

== Reception ==
Professional ratings
Aggregate scores
Source	Rating
Metacritic	76/100
Review scores
Source	Rating
AllMusic	3.5/5 stars
Cokemachineglow	77%
NME	8/10
Pitchfork	8.5/10
Playlouder	4/5 stars
Sputnikmusic	4.0/5
Stylus Magazine	A−
Tiny Mix Tapes	4.5/5 marks
Uncut	3/5 stars
Under the Radar	4/10

The album was a critical success, even being labeled "Best New Music" by Pitchfork.

== Track listing ==
All tracks are written by Noah Lennox.

No.	Title	Length
1.	Untitled	2:57
2.	Untitled	2:03
3.	Untitled	1:05
4.	Untitled	5:10
5.	Untitled	3:00
6.	Untitled	3:10
7.	Untitled	3:10
8.	Untitled	2:48
9.	Untitled	4:45
Total length:		27:58
