= Excepter =

American experimental music group

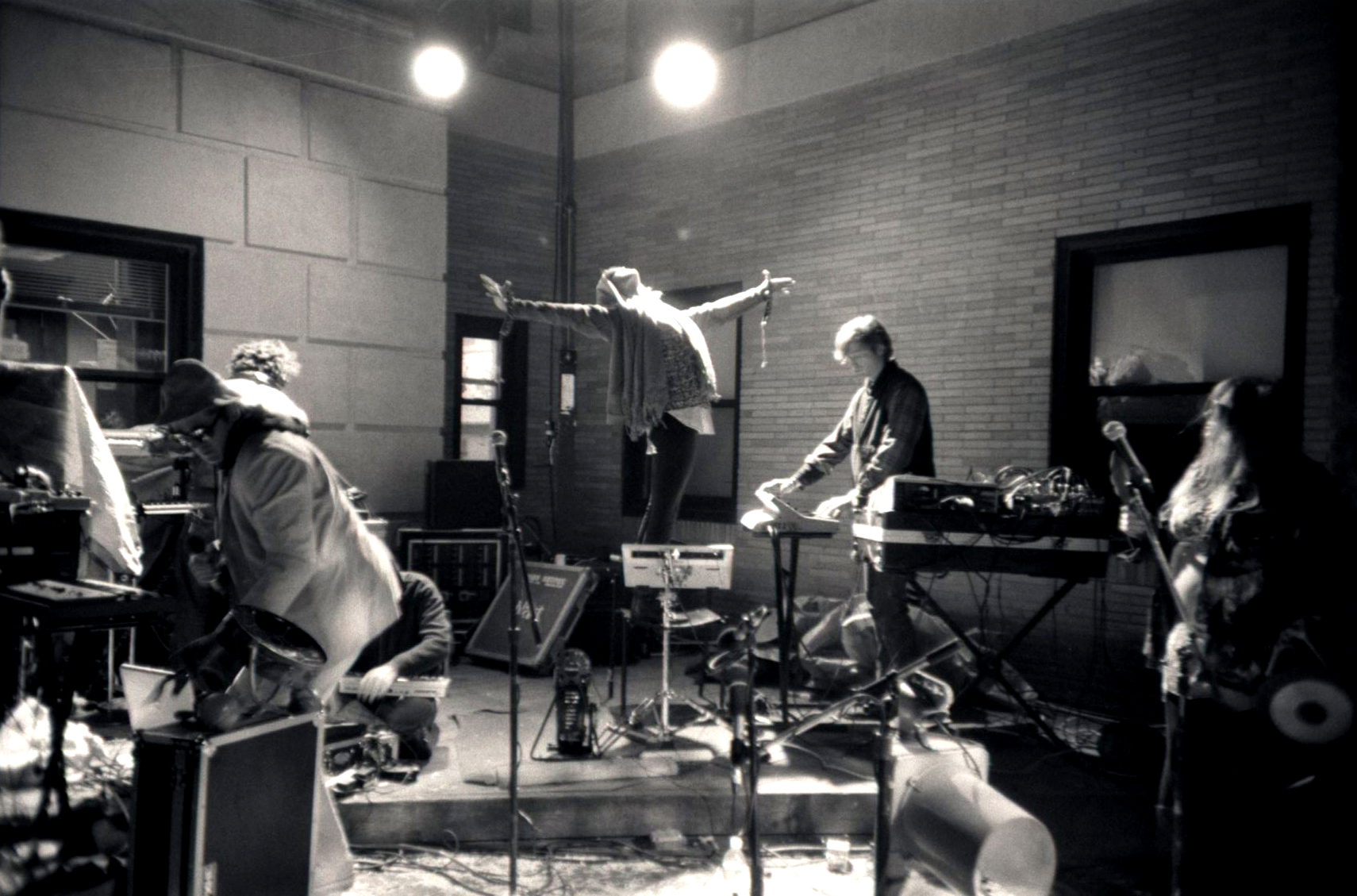
- Excepter at MIT Steer Roast, 2008

Background information
- Origin: New York City, New York, United States
- Genres: Experimental, psychedelic rock, industrial, noise, drone, house, dub, electroacoustic, improvisational, techno, new age, acid techno, underground hip hop
- Years active: 2002–present
- Labels: Paw Tracks, 5RC, RVNG, Load Records
- Members: John Fell Ryan Lala Ryan Jon Nicholson Nathan Corbin Macrae Semans Jon Williams Matita Rotto
- Past members: Dan Hougland Caitlin Cook Calder Martin Macrae Semans Clare Amory
- Website: Official website

Excepter is an experimental music group from Brooklyn, founded in 2002 by No-Neck Blues Band member John Fell Ryan. They have released their work on labels such as Load Records and Animal Collective's Paw Tracks, and are known for their improvisational approach to playing both live and in the studio.

The Village Voice alt-weekly has mentioned the subject of the band's attire, with blogger and (former) Voice writer, Nick Sylvester referring to them as having "ousted Animal Collective as the Village People of Brooklyn Noise". The significance of their hats was noted several more times. In 2007 the Pendu Sound compilation album Getting rid of the glue with Excepter and Daniel Carter was listed as number 70 in Thurston Moore's "Top 80 of 2006".

Nathan Corbin and Clare Amory participated as drummers in the Boredoms 77 Boadrum performance which occurred on July 7, 2007 at the Empire-Fulton Ferry State Park in Brooklyn, New York.

Excepter was featured on the cover of The Wire's May 2010 issue.

Member Clare Amory died of cancer on February 24, 2011.

== Discography ==
- Time Fog album (2025)
- The Debussy EP download album (2019, Excepter Records 35)
- ABRIL'14 (2018, Excepter Records 32)
- ABRIL20 download album (2018, Excepter Records 33)
- The Sejoro Box download (2015, Excepter Records 31)
- Familiar three-sided LP/ CD (2014, Blast First Petite/ Excepter Records 19)
- The Stand single-sided LP (2014, Dekorder/ Excepter Records 26)
- Christisland 12" 45 (2013, Cejero/ Escho/ Excepter Records 29)
- Maze of Death cassette (2010, Dog Daze Tapes dd-001/ Excepter Records 24); also released as STREAM 64)
- LATE LP (2010, Woodsist Records/ Excepter Records 22)
- Pseudo Code vs. Excepter 3-inch CD (2010, 777 was 666)
- Equinox cassette (2010, Temple of Pei/ Excepter Records 21)
- Presidence double CD (2010, Paw Tracks Paw32/ Excepter Records 17)
- Zion cassette (2010, Skrot Up Sut20/ Excepter Records 15; also released as STREAM 58)
- Steps: La Sala Rossa CD-R (2009, Abandon Ship Records)
- Black Beach LP/DVD (2009, Paw Tracks Paw28/ Excepter Records 18)
- Frkwys 2 12" 45 (2009, RVNG) remixes by Chris & Cosey, Jack Dangers (Meat Beat Manifesto; digital version only), and J. G. Thirlwell (Foetus)
- Debt Dept. (2008, Paw Tracks Paw21/Excepter Records 04) CD/LP
- "'Burgers" / "The Punjab" (2007, Paw Tracks Paw19/Excepter Records 16) 12" 45
- Streams 01 (2007, Fusetron 046/Excepter Records 10) double CD
- Tank Tapes (2007, Fuck It Tapes/Excepter Records 09) cassette
- "KKKKK" (2007, Paw Tracks Paw13/Excepter Records 12) 12" 45 split with Panda Bear
- OP (unreleased double 7" 45, iDeal Recordings; released in expanded form as a download album, Excepter Records 14)
- Alternation (2006, 5RC, GER047/Excepter Records 05) CD/double LP
- The Troglodytes (2006, HOSS Records, HOSS 002/Excepter Records 08) 12" 45 split with Leb-Laze
- Sunbomber (2006, 5RC, GER055/Excepter Records 11) CD
- Self Destruction (2005, Fusetron/Excepter Records 03) CD/LP
- Throne (2005, Load, Excepter Records 07) CD
- Obedience (777 was 666/Excepter Records 06) cassette
- "Vacation" / "'Forget Me'" (2004, Fusetron/Excepter Records 02) 12" 45
- KA (2003, Fusetron/Excepter Records 01) LP
- AG (2003, Excepter Records 00) CD-R EP
