= Coconuts (album) =

COcOnuts

Studio album by Jane
- Released: 2002
- Genre: Experimental, Electronic, Ambient
- Length: 49:29
- Label: Psych-o-path

Jane chronology
| Paradise (2002) | COcOnuts (2002) | Berserker (2005) |

Professional ratings
Review scores
| Source | Rating |
|---|---|
| Stylus Magazine | B link |
| Pitchfork Media | 7.0/10 link |

COcOnuts is the second album released by Jane, comprising Animal Collective member Panda Bear, and Scott Mou. It was originally self-released on CD-R's, but later became the first album released by Psych-o-path Records in 2005. The Psych-o-path version was remastered by Rusty Santos and Edik Kleyner.

== Track listing ==
1. Coconuts 23:51
2. Ossie 25:40
