= Berserker (Jane album) =

Studio album by Jane
- Released: April 26, 2005
- Genre: Experimental, Electronic, Ambient
- Length: 54:14
- Label: Paw Tracks

Jane chronology
| COcOnuts (2003) | Berserker (2005) |

Professional ratings
Review scores
| Source | Rating |
|---|---|
| Allmusic | 3/5 stars |
| Pop Matters | 6/10 stars |
| Pitchfork Media | (7.8/10) |

Berserker is the third album released by Jane, composed of Animal Collective member Panda Bear and Scott Mou. Berserker is Jane's first release on Paw Tracks.

The songs consist mostly of Mou sampling other musicians' backing tracks. According to Lennox, "It’s like a mix CD with toasting over the top [...]. [But] we make the songs our own because the way we move from track to track is unique.".

Lennox later described the writing process on the Paw Tracks website:

"Scotty and I worked together at a record store in NYC. He was a DJ around town and he still is I think. We both really liked dance music and dance music from the very beginning and I mean stomps and shouts and claps and stuff like that. Of course we like all kinds of other stuff too, but it's the dance that gets us going on Jane. We played once at the Animal Collective practice space, but found it much more pleasant to play at Scotty's home in Greenpoint where he had his mixer and simple microphones and we would drink brews and talk about all kinds of things and then play. I would usually sing about stuff I was thinking about that day and Scotty would move with it, playing jams and it would all kind of pour out. We liked all the mechanical robo dance jams from Detroit and Chicago and Germany but we wanted to do something with less 0's and 1's and more souls. Mostly it was about hanging out together and talking and playing music that was about talking together and hanging out and thinking and feeling and having fun and dancing most of all."

== Track listing ==
| No. | Title | Sample(s) | Length |
|---|---|---|---|
| 1. | "Berserker" | "Ebony Eyes" by The Everly Brothers | 6:00 |
| 2. | "Agg Report" | | 11:48 |
| 3. | "Slipping Away" | | 11:42 |
| 4. | "Swan" | | 24:44 |
