= Dead Drunk (album) =

Studio album by Terrestrial Tones
- Released: March 7, 2006
- Recorded: Summer 2005, Paris
- Genre: Noise
- Length: 32:17
- Label: Paw Tracks

Terrestrial Tones chronology
Blasted (2005)	Dead Drunk (2006)

Professional ratings
Review scores
Source	Rating
Pitchfork	6.7/10

Dead Drunk is the third album by Terrestrial Tones, released in 2006.

== Critical reception ==
Exclaim! wrote that "for those with adventurous taste who aren't turned off by laptops or tomfoolery, Dead Drunk definitely has what you're looking for: fresh, fun frequencies to melt your mind or zone out to." AllMusic described the album as "a confusion of electronic loops in machine room ambience, with the humanizing element of often distorted, sometimes almost rhythmic and melodic voices." The Stranger wrote that the band "engineer every sound granule to subvert your equilibrium and induce teeming, irrational thoughts."

== Track listing ==
1. "Car Fumes" - 6:38
2. "The Sailor" - 6:33
3. "Gargoyle" - 2:38
4. "Plow Man" - 5:39
5. "Magic Trick" - 1:14
6. "Future Train" - 4:08
7. "This Weekend Wow" - 5:33

== Personnel ==
- Eric Copeland
- Avey Tare
