= Peacebone =

2007 single by Animal Collective

Single by Animal Collective

from the album Strawberry Jam
- Released: August 13, 2007; August 21, 2007 (EP)
- Recorded: January 2007
- Genre: Experimental pop
- Length: 5:14
- Label: Domino
- Producer: Animal Collective

Animal Collective singles chronology
| "Grass" (2006) | "Peacebone" (2007) | "Fireworks" (2007) |

Animal Collective chronology
| People (2006) | Peacebone (2007) | Strawberry Jam (2007) |

"Peacebone" is a single (and later an EP) by American experimental pop band Animal Collective, released on August 13, 2007 by Domino Records. It was issued in advance of the group's 2007 album, Strawberry Jam, which was released in September of that year. The single version contains "Safer" as a B-side, while the EP contains two additional remixes of "Peacebone" by Black Dice and Pantha du Prince, respectively.

== Formats ==
There are three different versions of the single. The 10" vinyl features the B-side "Safer", a live favorite during the Collective's Strawberry Jam concerts in 2005 and 2006. The 12" vinyl contains two remixes of the title track, one by Black Dice and another by Pantha du Prince. Finally, the CD is a collection of both vinyl releases, and is considered by the record label to be an EP.

== Song content ==
The word being spoken throughout the song was confirmed by band member Deakin on the Collected Animals message board to be "bonefish". The sample appears to be taken from the Cornell Lab of Ornithology's online media archive. About the further lyrical content, Avey Tare said in an Interview with BBC:

I'm just blending together visual images from different places. [...] But it always comes back down to the chorus, which is about having an obsession with the past, which is something I'm not into in terms of culture. Music should be more than just something to stomp to - it should be more interactive. For us it's not always about just writing a good song - we wanna play with your ears in terms of colors and space with sound.

== Music video ==
The accompanying video for the song "Peacebone" was created by Timothy Saccenti. It makes many references to the film Aliens, and tells a love story between a Xenomorph-like creature and a girl.

== Track listing ==
EP version
| No. | Title | Length |
|---|---|---|
| 1. | "Peacebone" (album version) | 5:14 |
| 2. | "Safer" | 9:13 |
| 3. | "Peacebone" (Black Dice Remix) | 4:58 |
| 4. | "Peacebone" (Pantha du Prince Remix) | 10:02 |
