= Eucalyptus (Avey Tare album) =

Studio album by Avey Tare
- Released: July 21, 2017
- Recorded: 2017
- Genre: Electroacoustic, experimental
- Length: 62:29
- Label: Domino

Avey Tare chronology
Down There (2010)	Eucalyptus (2017)	Cows on Hourglass Pond (2019)

Professional ratings
Aggregate scores
Source	Rating
AnyDecentMusic?	6.4/10
Metacritic	68/100
Review scores
Source	Rating
AllMusic	3/5 stars
The A.V. Club	C+
The Guardian	4/5 stars
The Independent	2/5 stars
Mojo	3/5 stars
The Observer	3/5 stars
PopMatters	6/10
Pitchfork	7.6/10
Q	4/5 stars
Uncut	5/10

Eucalyptus is the second solo studio album by American recording artist Avey Tare. Released on July 21, 2017, it is Avey Tare's second album, following his 2010 debut Down There, Recorded by fellow Animal Collective bandmate Joshua Dibb, it features past collaborators Eyvind Kang and Angel Deradoorian.

== Production ==
A press release by Domino described the album as "an electroacoustic movement through leaves, rocks and dust. Written on sunlit bedroom afternoon in Los Angeles, practiced in the dark early hours of the California twilight, and slept on under Big Sur skies."

Portner wrote the album by himself in 2014, but due to commitments with his band Animal Collective he set the material aside. In an interview with Stereogum, Portner elaborated on the writing of the album:

...my process would just be pretty much: pick up my acoustic guitar, sit on my bed, just spend part of the afternoon or a couple of hours playing guitar and singing with my recorder — I record everything that I play. I like to find a good balance between intuitive creativity and something that's very thought out. And I feel like the most intuitive thing, the best idea, is just the first one that comes, often. So I just collected a bunch of that kinda stuff over the year basically.

His friend and bandmate Josh Dibb proposed properly recording the album in 2016. The two recorded the album together at their respective homes.

== Promotion ==
A week before properly announcing the album, Domino Records mailed out several packages to a handful of recipients. In the package was a tiny puzzle, which displayed the album art once assembled. The label on the box listed the track listing and personnel.

== Track listing ==
All tracks written by Avey Tare.

No.	Title	Length
1.	"Season High"	5:47
2.	"Melody Unfair"	5:07
3.	"Ms. Secret"	5:32
4.	"Lunch Out of Order Pt. 1"	1:44
5.	"Lunch Out of Order Pt. 2"	1:52
6.	"Jackson 5"	3:47
7.	"DR aw one for J"	3:12
8.	"PJ"	4:13
9.	"In Pieces"	3:05
10.	"Selection of a Place"	6:07
11.	"Boat Race"	2:16
12.	"Roamer"	2:46
13.	"Coral Lords"	8:03
14.	"Sports in July"	4:46
15.	"When You Left Me"	4:12
Total length:		62:29

The track "Selection of a Place" also appears on Animal Collective's Meeting of the Waters EP, although it is listed on the EP as the "Rio Negro Version". The two tracks only share similarities in lyrics and chord progression.

== Personnel ==
Credits adapted from AllMusic.

- Avey Tare – vocals, guitar, synthesizer
- Eyvind Kang – orchestrations
- Angel Deradoorian – vocals
- Jessika Kenney – vocals
- Susan Alcorn – pedal steel guitars

== Charts ==
Chart (2017)	Peak position
US Heatseekers Albums (Billboard)	15
US Independent Albums (Billboard)	37
