= Strawberry Jam =

Studio album by Animal Collective
- Released: September 10, 2007
- Recorded: January 2007
- Studios: Wave Lab Studios, Tucson, Arizona
- Genres: Psychedelic pop; electronic pop; experimental pop; psychedelic folk
- Length: 43:31
- Label: Domino
- Producer: Animal Collective

Animal Collective chronology
| Feels (2005) | Strawberry Jam (2007) | Water Curses (2008) |

Singles from Strawberry Jam
- 1. "Peacebone" Released: August 13, 2007; 2. "Fireworks" Released: November 5, 2007

Strawberry Jam is the seventh studio album by American experimental pop band Animal Collective. It was released in September 2007, the band's first on Domino Records. It was accompanied by the singles "Peacebone" and "Fireworks". The album was the band's first to chart on the Billboard 200, debuting and peaking at number 72.

== Recording ==
The album was recorded at Wave Lab Studios in Tucson, Arizona. Band member Brian Weitz explained this choice of location on the Collected Animals message board:

"dave [Portner] and i were talking a few months back about environments to record and one of us was like maybe it'd be sweet to make this next one a desert record and then everyone was like yeah man we haven't done that yet and it seems like it could fit the songs and the way we want them to sound. that might not make sense to anyone but us."

They finally settled on Tucson, where Weitz had previously lived. Moreover, Strawberry Jam engineer Scott Colburn, who also worked with the band to record the predecessor Feels, knew Wave Lab's owner. According to member Noah Lennox, it was a conscious decision to record the album "in a desert setting."

The group, particularly Josh Dibb, struggled during the recording of Strawberry Jam, with Portner stating it was "the first time we ran into a situation where we weren’t completely satisfied with what was happening". As it was their first album for Domino, they were fearful of turning in what they felt was a difficult record. However, label manager Peter Berard assured the band the songs were "incredible", noting that they had a clarity that was absent from previous albums, and that they would appeal to newcomers and possibly expand their commercial potential.

== Album content ==
"Chores"
Excerpt of "Chores", track 3.

The title and track listing were revealed by band member Geologist on the Collected Animals message board on May 16, 2007. In a pre-release interview with Billboard, guitarist Deakin/Josh Dibb described the new album as "chiseled" and "shiver-inducing". According to the interview, the majority of the album's songs were played on the band's live shows from 2005 to 2006, but that there would be, "nonetheless, a few new ones that we've never played live."

Two songs that had been played extensively on the band's 2005–2006 concerts, "Safer" and "Street Flash", were not included on Strawberry Jam. Regarding the songs' absences, singer and guitarist Avey Tare/David Portner wrote to fans that the band recorded studio versions for both, but decided against including them on the album, "partially due to their length[s]". "Safer" was eventually released as the B-side of the album's first single, "Peacebone", while "Street Flash" and other studio leftovers appeared on the 2008 EP Water Curses.

About the content of "Peacebone", Portner said in an interview with the BBC:

I'm just blending together visual images from different places. [...] But it always comes back down to the chorus, which is about having an obsession with the past, which is something I'm not into in terms of culture. Music should be more than just something to stomp to - it should be more interactive. For us it's not always about just writing a good song - we wanna play with your ears in terms of colours and space with sound.

== Title and cover art ==
The name Strawberry Jam came from singer and drummer Panda Bear as he and the band were on a plane headed to Greece for a show. Upon receiving his complimentary tray of food, he opened up the packet of strawberry jam that had been provided for the bread. As he removed the cover of the packet, he was drawn to the look of the glistening jam, and he expressed his desire for the production of their new album to sound like the jam looked, "that is to say, something that's really synthetic and sharp and futuristic looking," but also "tangy and sweet, almost in a kind of aggressive way in terms of the way it tastes".

Avey Tare created and photographed the cover art. Additional layout and design was done by Rob Carmichael, with whom Animal Collective has collaborated on several other projects.

== Internet leak ==
The album's internet leak on June 12, 2007, was notable in that it was leaked in three song clusters over a period of weeks. Geologist wrote on the Collected Animals board that the first batch of promotional copies were watermarked, and that each journalist's name would be digitally embedded in any extracted files. On June 19, 2007, a letter from the band's publicist was sent to music journalists regarding the leaking of the first three songs:

Last week three tracks from Animal Collective's new album leaked. Within minutes we were able to track the leak to a writer's CD. That person got in more trouble than you care to hear about and was almost fired. The person was also forced to write an apology letter to an entire staff of people and the head of Domino Records along with other penance.

Panda Bear talked with Shout Mouth regarding the band's thoughts on the leak:

The only thing we’re really upset about with the leak is that it’s only parts of it. I think there are six songs out there now. People aren’t even able to get the full experience of the album, which bums us all out quite a bit. So if you’re listening leakers [speaking directly into the tape recorder], put up those other three songs, man, pronto.

The remaining three tracks—"Fireworks", "Cuckoo Cuckoo" and "Derek"—were all leaked on July 4, 2007.

== Reception ==
Professional ratings
Aggregate scores
| Source | Rating |
|---|---|
| Metacritic | 79/100 |
Review scores
| Source | Rating |
| AllMusic | 4/5 stars |
| The A.V. Club | B+ |
| Blender | 4/5 stars |
| The Guardian | 4/5 stars |
| NME | 8/10 |
| Pitchfork | 9.3/10 |
| Q | 4/5 stars |
| Rolling Stone | 3/5 stars |
| Spin | 6/10 |
| Uncut | 4/5 stars |

The album received a normalized rating of 79 out of 100 (based on 34 reviews from mainstream critics) from Metacritic, indicating generally favourable reviews. In a positive review, Mark Richardson of Pitchfork described the band as having mastered "its distinctive experimental approach to songwriting, folding celebration, longing, doubt, loss, and acceptance into complex hooks and choruses." Pitchfork also ranked Strawberry Jam 6 in their Top 50 Albums of 2007 list. AllMusic's Thom Jurek called Strawberry Jam the band's "most primal yet most sophisticated record... to date," and praised the unresolved tension pitting Panda Bear's "bubbling sunshine pop" and "goodwill toward everything" against "[Avey] Tare's utter sense of alienation, his strangeness -- and estrangement -- from the limits and inconveniences of the human body and its politics, and his questioning of his own place in human relationships and interactions." Meanwhile, Erik Davis of Spin was more lukewarm in his review, rating the album three out of five stars and saying that it "rides the line between childlike and childish." Mojo called it "an album of mischievous melody, fairground keyboards, cut'n'paste aural collage and an undeniable love of pop all but buried in junk shop Dadaist clatter."

As of 2012, Strawberry Jam has sold 84,000 copies.

== Track listing ==
All tracks are written by Animal Collective.

| No. | Title | Length |
|---|---|---|
| 1. | "Peacebone" | 5:13 |
| 2. | "Unsolved Mysteries" | 4:25 |
| 3. | "Chores" | 4:30 |
| 4. | "For Reverend Green" | 6:34 |
| 5. | "Fireworks" | 6:50 |
| 6. | "#1" | 4:32 |
| 7. | "Winter Wonder Land" | 2:44 |
| 8. | "Cuckoo Cuckoo" | 5:42 |
| 9. | "Derek" | 3:01 |
| Total length: | | 43:31 |

== Personnel ==
Credits adapted from the liner notes of Strawberry Jam.

=== Animal Collective/"Strawberry Band" ===
- Avey Tare – performance
- Deakin (credited as "Deacon" on packaging) – performance
- Geologist – performance
- Panda Bear – performance

=== Technical personnel ===
- Scott Colburn – recording engineering
- Nicolas Vernhes – mixing, additional tracking
- Alan Douches – mastering
