= Paw Tracks =

American independent record label

- Founded: 1999
- Defunct: 2013
- Status: Inactive
- Genre: Neo-psychedelia, lo-fi, experimental
- Country of origin: U.S.
- Location: Washington, D.C.
- Official website: www.paw-tracks.com

Paw Tracks (formerly known as Soccer Stars until 2000, then Animal until 2003) was an independent record label based in Washington, D.C.

At first only records by Animal Collective were released on the label, but since 2004 it has also released records by other artists; the first was The Doldrums by Ariel Pink in October 2004. Although originally exclusively run by the members of Animal Collective, Paw Tracks is now co-owned by members of Carpark Records. A number of the artists on Paw Tracks were chosen by Animal Collective to perform at the All Tomorrow's Parties Festival 2011. The label's website features artwork by Abby Portner (sister of Animal Collective's Avey Tare and member of the Paw Tracks group Drawlings (formerly First Nation/Rings)).

== Roster ==
- Animal Collective
- Ariel Pink
- Avey Tare
- Avey Tare & Kría Brekkan
- Black Dice
- Dent May
- Eric Copeland
- Excepter
- Jane
- Kría Brekkan
- Panda Bear
- The Peppermints
- Prince Rama
- Rings (formerly First Nation)
- Terrestrial Tones
- Tickley Feather

== Soccer Stars discography ==
- Panda Bear – Panda Bear – 1999

== Animal discography ==
- Avey Tare and Panda Bear – Spirit They're Gone, Spirit They've Vanished – 2000

== Paw Tracks discography ==
- PAW1 – Animal Collective – Here Comes the Indian – 2003
- PAW2 – Panda Bear – Young Prayer – 2004
- PAW3 – Black Dice / Animal Collective – Wastered – 2004
- PAW4 – Ariel Pink's Haunted Graffiti – The Doldrums – 2004
- PAW5 – Ariel Pink's Haunted Graffiti – Worn Copy – 2005
- PAW6 – Jane – Berserker – 2005
- PAW7 – The Peppermints – Jesüs Chryst – 2005
- PAW8 – Ariel Pink's Haunted Graffiti – House Arrest – 2006
- PAW9 – Terrestrial Tones – Dead Drunk (album) – 2006
- PAW10 – First Nation – Coronation 7" – 2006
- PAW11 – First Nation – First Nation – 2006
- PAW12 – Animal Collective – Hollinndagain (Reissue) – 2006
- PAW13 – Panda Bear & Excepter – Carrots/KKKKK 12" – 2007
- PAW14 – Panda Bear – Person Pitch – 2007
- PAW15 – Avey Tare & Kría Brekkan – Pullhair Rubeye – 2007
- PAW16 – Black Dice – Roll Up / Drool 12" – 2007
- PAW17 – Panda Bear – Take Pills – 2007
- PAW17 2? – Eric Copeland – Hermaphrodite – 2007
- PAW18 – Black Dice – Load Blown – 2007
- PAW19 – Excepter – Burgers / The Punjab 12" – 2007
- PAW20 – Rings – Black Habit – 2008
- PAW21 – Excepter – Debt Dept. – 2008
- PAW22 – Tickley Feather – Tickley Feather – 2008
- PAW23 – Eric Copeland – Alien In a Garbage Dump 12" – 2008
- PAW24 – Dent May & His Magnificent Ukulele – The Good Feeling Music of Dent May & His Magnificent Ukulele – 2009
- PAW25 – Reverend Green / Drawlings – Be Good To Earth This Season / Wolfie's Christmas 7" – 2008
- PAW26 – Black Dice – REPO – 2009
- PAW27 – Eric Copeland – Alien In a Garbage Dump – 2009
- PAW28 – Excepter – Black Beach – 2009
- PAW29 – Tickley Feather – Hors D'Oeuvres – 2009
- PAW30 – Animal Collective – Campfire Songs (Reissue) – 2010
- PAW31 – Kría Brekkan – Uterus Water 7" – 2010
- PAW32 – Excepter – Presidence – 2010
- PAW33 – Panda Bear – Tomboy / Slow Motion 7" – 2010
- PAW34 – Prince Rama – Shadow Temple – 2010
- PAW35 – Avey Tare – Down There – 2010
- PAW36 – Panda Bear – Tomboy – 2011
- PAW37 – Prince Rama – Trust Now – 2011
- PAW38 – Dent May – Fun – 2011
- PAW39 – Panda Bear – Tomboy Tomboy Expanded – 2011
- PAW40 – Dent May – Do Things – 2012
- PAW41 – Prince Rama – Top Ten Hits of the End of the World – 2012
- PAW42 – Dent May – Warm Blanket – 2013

== Digital Releases ==
- PAW Digital 1 – Panda Bear – Live at ZDB, Lisbon, Portugal, September 2004 – 2007
- PAW Digital 2 – Panda Bear – You Can Count On Me / Alsatian Darn – 2010
- PAW Digital 3 – Panda Bear – Last Night at the Jetty / Drone – 2010
- PAW Digital 4 – Panda Bear – Surfers Hymn / Actress Remix – 2011

== See also ==
- List of record labels
