= 7s (album) =

Studio album by Avey Tare
- Released: February 17, 2023
- Length: 43:57
- Label: Domino
- Producer: Adam McDaniel; Avey Tare

Avey Tare chronology
Cows on Hourglass Pond (2019)	7s (2023)

Singles from 7s
- 1. "The Musical" / "Hey Bog" Released: January 12, 2023; 2. "Invisible Darlings" Released: February 13, 2023

Professional ratings
Aggregate scores
Source	Rating
AnyDecentMusic?	7.3/10
Metacritic	78/100
Review scores
Source	Rating
AllMusic	4/5 stars
Clash	7/10
DIY	3/5 stars
Far Out	4/5 stars
Mojo	4/5 stars
Pitchfork	6.7/10
Uncut	8/10

7s is an album by American musician Avey Tare. It was released on February 17, 2023, through Domino Recording Company.

== Track listing ==
All tracks are produced by Adam McDaniel and Avey Tare.

7s track listing
No.	Title	Length
1.	"Invisible Darlings"	4:19
2.	"Lips at Night"	4:05
3.	"The Musical"	5:54
4.	"Hey Bog"	9:23
5.	"Sweeper's Grin"	8:30
6.	"Neurons"	5:38
7.	"Cloud Stop Rest Start"	6:05
Total length:		43:57
