= Mr Noah =

EP by Panda Bear
- Released: October 23, 2014
- Recorded: 2013–2014
- Studio: Miosotis Garage (Almada, Portugal); Estudio Namouche (Lisbon, Portugal)
- Length: 16:08
- Label: Domino
- Producer: Panda Bear; Sonic Boom

Panda Bear chronology
Tomboy (2011)	Mr Noah (2014)	Panda Bear Meets the Grim Reaper (2015)

Mr Noah is the first EP by American recording artist Panda Bear, released in 2014.

The title track was later featured on the 2015 full-length album Panda Bear Meets the Grim Reaper, while the other three songs were not.

== Track listing ==
No.	Title	Length
1.	"Mr Noah"	4:13
2.	"Faces in the Crowd"	4:09
3.	"Untying the Knot"	3:11
4.	"This Side of Paradise"	4:35
Total length:		16:08
