= Cows on Hourglass Pond =

Studio album by Avey Tare
- Released: March 22, 2019
- Recorded: January–March 2018
- Studio: Laughing Gas (Asheville, North Carolina)
- Genre: Neo-psychedelia; psychedelic folk
- Length: 45:43
- Label: Domino
- Producer: Avey Tare

Avey Tare chronology
Eucalyptus (2017)	Cows on Hourglass Pond (2019)	7s (2023)

Singles from Cows on Hourglass Pond
- 1. "Saturdays (Again)" Released: January 29, 2019; 2. "Taken Boy" Released: February 27, 2019; 3. "HORS_" Released: March 18, 2019

Professional ratings
Aggregate scores
Source	Rating
AnyDecentMusic?	7.6/10
Metacritic	82/100
Review scores
Source	Rating
AllMusic	4.5/5 stars
Consequence of Sound	B+
DIY	4/5 stars
Pitchfork	7.0/10
The Line of Best Fit	8.5/10

Cows on Hourglass Pond is the third solo studio album by American musician Avey Tare. It was released on March 22, 2019, by Domino Recording Company. The album follows 2017's Eucalyptus and was supported by a tour. Its announcement was accompanied by the release of the video for "Saturdays (Again)", directed by Avey Tare's sister, Abby Portner.

== Recording ==
The album was recorded directly onto a TASCAM 48 half-inch reel-to-reel tape machine at Laughing Gas studio in Asheville, North Carolina, from January to March 2018. It was mixed by Portner and Adam McDaniel at Drop of Sun Studios, in Asheville, NC.

== Composition ==
"Saturdays (Again)" was noted as being somewhat similar to the sound of Eucalyptus in that it is acoustic, but "within a lush and dubby mix, atop melodic synth bass, [and] accompanied by peals of lead guitar", according to Spin. It was also considered "low-key" with few vocal effects.

== Track listing ==
No.	Title	Length
1.	"What's the Goodside?"	6:31
2.	"Eyes on Eyes"	4:31
3.	"Nostalgia in Lemonade"	3:41
4.	"Saturdays (Again)"	4:49
5.	"Chilly Blue"	2:51
6.	"K.C. Yours"	6:12
7.	"Our Little Chapter"	3:40
8.	"Taken Boy"	3:41
9.	"Remember Mayan"	4:51
10.	"HORS_"	4:56
Total length:		45:43

Animal Collective webstore bonus 10-inch vinyl
No.	Title	Length
1.	"Tipped in Hugs"	5:05
2.	"Dog Says Goodbye"	6:47
