= Fireworks (Animal Collective song) =

Single by Animal Collective

from the album Strawberry Jam
- Released: November 5, 2007
- Recorded: January 2007
- Genre: Experimental rock; psychedelic pop; neo-psychedelia
- Length: 6:50
- Label: Domino
- Songwriter(s): Animal Collective
- Producer(s): Animal Collective

Animal Collective singles chronology
"Peacebone" (2007)	"Fireworks" (2007)	"My Girls" (2009)

"Fireworks" is the second single from Animal Collective's 2007 album, Strawberry Jam, released November 5, 2007 by Domino Records. Rather than including a B-side, the reverse side of the record is an etching. The video for the song premiered in July 2007, which shows the band members watching fireworks. During the tours of 2005 and 2006 this song was known as "Allman Vibe".

The song was listed at No. 35 on Pitchfork Media's top 500 songs of the 2000s.

When performed live between 2007 and 2009, the song often stretched upwards of ten minutes with the addition of elements of either "Essplode" or "Lablakely Dress", two songs from the band's earlier album Danse Manatee.

This song appeared in the Channel 4 drama series Skins in 2007, and in an episode of the third season of HBO series In Treatment in 2010.

== Track listing ==
No.	Title	Length
1.	"Fireworks"	6:50
