= Merriweather Post Pavilion (album) =

2009 studio album by Animal Collective

Studio album by Animal Collective
- Released: January 6, 2009
- Recorded: February–July 2008
- Studios: Sweet Tea (Oxford, Mississippi)
- Genres: Psychedelic pop; electronic pop; synth-pop; indie; neo-psychedelia; avant-pop
- Length: 54:45
- Label: Domino
- Producers: Animal Collective; Ben H. Allen

Animal Collective chronology
Water Curses (2008)	Merriweather Post Pavilion (2009)	Animal Crack Box (2009)

Singles from Merriweather Post Pavilion
- 1. "My Girls" Released: March 23, 2009; 2. "Summertime Clothes" Released: June 29, 2009; 3. "Brother Sport" Released: November 9, 2009

Merriweather Post Pavilion is the eighth studio album by the American experimental pop group Animal Collective, released on January 6, 2009, through Domino Records. The group recorded the album as a trio featuring members Panda Bear (Noah Lennox), Avey Tare (Dave Portner) and Geologist (Brian Weitz), with co-production by Ben H. Allen. It is titled after the Maryland venue of the same name, where Portner and Weitz attended concerts in their youth.

Merriweather Post Pavilion saw the band continue to explore the electronica-based sound featured on their previous album Strawberry Jam, but favors a lush production style compared to its predecessor. Drawing sonically from Panda Bear's 2007 solo album Person Pitch, and working largely without guitars, the band made extensive use of samplers and synthesizers as primary instruments, as well as prominent reverb. The band also installed PA systems in the studio in an attempt to replicate the energy of their live shows.

The album peaked at No. 13 on the Billboard 200 and No. 2 on the US Top Independent Albums charts. According to review aggregate site Metacritic, Merriweather was the most critically acclaimed album of 2009, and went on to sell over 200,000 copies by 2012. It spawned the singles "My Girls" (named the Best Song of 2009 by Pitchfork and Slant Magazine), "Summertime Clothes", and "Brother Sport". The album's reverb-heavy psychedelic pop sound would exert a wide influence on music of the subsequent decade.

== Background ==
After recording Strawberry Jam in January 2007, guitarist Deakin (Josh Dibb) decided he would take time off from the group for undisclosed personal reasons. As a result, the group went about writing a new batch of songs to be played without guitar. The group debuted nine of these songs, most of which would later appear on the album, in May 2007 and toured with them through 2008.

To record their eighth studio album, Animal Collective sought the services of Ben H. Allen as co-producer. In an interview with the Baltimore City Paper, Allen stated that the band chose him due to "my work with Gnarls Barkley, and wanted my low-end expertise". According to band-member Brian Weitz, while "[t]hat was the original attraction", Animal Collective was also impressed by his eclectic music tastes, "[h]e seemed to be somebody that technically knew how to work in [urban hip-hop], but was open-minded to other styles as well... knowing that he'd been involved in a lot of the Bad Boy Records stuff from the '90s was exciting to us". Subsequently, the band and Allen met over a few conference calls on Skype in January 2008.

== Recording ==
The band recorded the album February 2008 at Sweet Tea Recording Studio in Oxford, Mississippi, with mixing completed in June or July of that year at Chase Park Transduction in Athens, Georgia. Drawing inspiration from Lennox's 2007 Panda Bear album Person Pitch, the band used samplers as its primary instruments, specifically the Roland SP-404 and SP-555 samplers; of the former, Brian Weitz said "it's become an instrument that we know really well. It's really user‑friendly. You can do things in real time on it." The group also used synthesizers such as the Roland SH2 and Novation Bass Station (for bassier sounds) and Juno 60 (for higher melodic lines and arpeggiated parts). The Eventide H3000 Ultra‑Harmonizer also helped the group define the sound of the album: according to Allen, "those guys fell in love with the H3000. [...] A lot of times, with the piano and acoustic guitar stuff, we would run it through the H3000 and create a pitched‑up and a pitched‑down version and mix it back in so it'd have an otherworldly sort of feel. Many of the percussion sounds were played acoustically by Lennox, then layered and processed through the samplers' effects units.

Privacy during the sessions was paramount for the group, and a significant factor for choosing Sweet Tea. According to Allen, "During the whole month we worked on the album, the only people there were me, my assistant, and the band. No phones or computers... It's a small town, we were in the South, no one knew who they were. It was nonstop [work]". The studio also offered other advantages; Dave Portner felt Sweet Tea was "the vibiest studio I’ve ever been in. It feels like you're making music in a living room that just happens to have a Neve 8038 desk in it". Further, since Animal Collective planned to record a sample-heavy album, the studio's large control room was ideal; Weitz stated, "we wanted to do most of the tracking in the same room as the engineer". On Merriweather Post Pavilion, the band wanted to capture a live sound on record, just as it intended to on Strawberry Jam. However, recording methods for the two albums were very different, in Noah Lennox's words, "we went about them in totally opposite ways". While on Strawberry Jam they worked with a live foundation (over which they added few overdubs), on Merriweather... they "tracked pretty much every sound individually on its own channel, so that we'd have complete control over every sound in the mixing process".

The band adopted a number of unorthodox recording practices. For instance, Animal Collective set up its PA systems in the control room in an attempt to replicate the group's live sound; Weitz said, "since so much of [the album] was electronic and sample-based, we used those PA speakers to make the samples".

== Artwork ==
"The picture of the sleeve on this page is nowhere near big enough. Go look it up online, as big as you can, and stare at it very hard. See how, as you try to focus on any one part of the tessellated pattern, the sections in the periphery of your vision shift and undulate, almost alive, making it impossible to pin the image down in your mind?"

— Emily Mackay, in NME's review of the album

The artwork features an example of illusory motion, a type of optical illusion which is based on the works of Japanese psychologist Akiyoshi Kitaoka. It was compiled and packaged by Robert Carmichael of SEEN studio, who has worked for Animal Collective before and after.

== Release ==
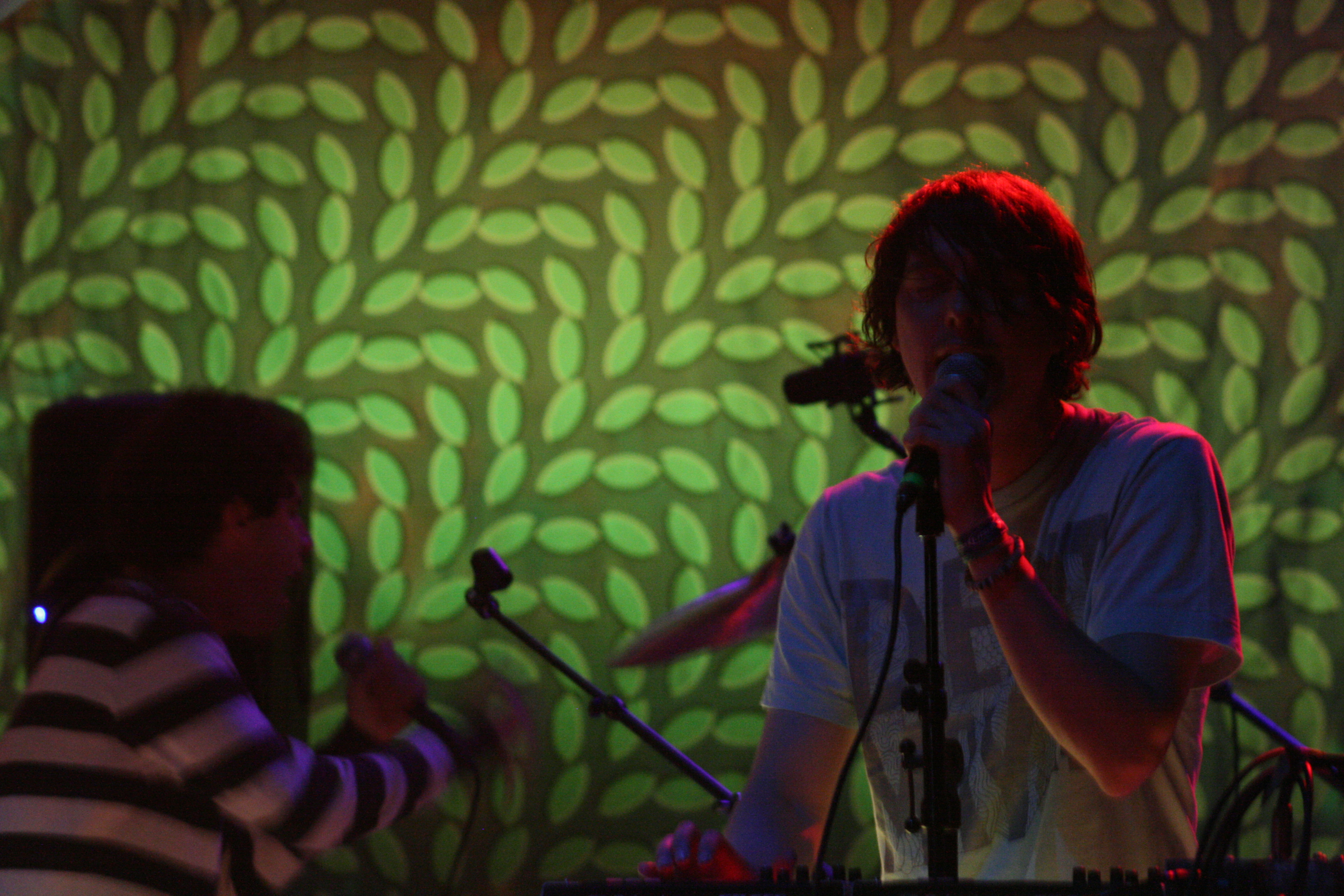
Animal Collective on tour promoting the album in June 2009

Merriweather Post Pavilion was announced in a cryptic update to Animal Collective's official website on October 5, 2008, an update which initially caused a great deal of confusion about the nature of the news. The site was updated again on October 8 with a link to a second page showing a video of the track listing, which was followed by an official announcement regarding the nature of the news on October 10. Prior to the album's official release, a number of promotional listening parties were held in various cities across the United States and United Kingdom.

On November 18, the track "Brother Sport" was leaked onto the internet by way of its inclusion in a French music podcast. The track was subsequently posted on many blogs, including Pitchfork, but was later removed virtually everywhere by the international internet policing company Web Sheriff. On November 24, it was incorrectly reported that the band Grizzly Bear had leaked the track through their blog. Ed Droste of Grizzly Bear later clarified that they had only reposted the track as many other blogs had done. A low-quality vinyl rip of the album leaked online on December 25, 2008.

The album was released on vinyl in the United States on January 6, 2009. It was released on both vinyl and CD in the UK on January 12, and on CD and digitally in the United States on January 20. Peaking at number 13 on the United States Billboard 200, by 2012 the album had sold over 199,000 copies, more than twice as many as the group's previous top-seller, Strawberry Jam. In 2009. It was awarded a silver certification from the Independent Music Companies Association which indicated sales of at least 30,000 copies throughout Europe.

== Reception ==
Professional ratings
Aggregate scores
Source	Rating
AnyDecentMusic?	8.4/10
Metacritic	89/100
Review scores
Source	Rating
AllMusic	5/5 stars
The A.V. Club	A
Entertainment Weekly	A−
The Guardian	4/5 stars
Los Angeles Times	3.5/4 stars
NME	8/10
Pitchfork	9.6/10
Q	4/5 stars
Rolling Stone	3.5/5 stars
Spin	4/5 stars

Merriweather Post Pavilion was met with universal acclaim. At Metacritic, which assigns a normalized rating out of 100 to reviews from mainstream critics, the album has received an average score of 89, based on 36 reviews. Slant Magazine and Uncut gave the album five out of five stars. Stephen Troussé of Uncut wrote that the album "feels like one of the landmark American albums of the century so far." Andrzej Lukowski of Drowned in Sound wrote "Is Merriweather Post Pavilion the flawless album that it's been willed to be? Taken as a whole I'd say it's pretty damn close." Among mixed reviews, Michael Patrick Brady of The Boston Phoenix gave the album two and a half stars out of four, arguing that the album "lacks the playfulness and spontaneity that endeared so many to this group". By contrast, Andy Beta of Spin praised the album's "startling, pounding, effulgent sonic template" for combining many of the group's previous touchstones, including harmonic Beach Boys pop, African tribal chants, minimal techno, psychedelia, and dub.

Pitchfork's Mark Richardson stated that the album is "striking in its immediacy and comes across as friendly and welcoming". The A.V. Club's Andy Battaglia called the album a "summation and an expansion of everything Animal Collective has done so far, with a sharper focus on melody and more emboldened vocals that drive the songs." Dave Simpson of The Guardian gave the album four out of five stars, declaring the album sound as "their most 'pop'" and the album itself as "a joyful, transcendent record somehow reminiscent of kids let loose in a musical sandpit." Entertainment Weekly's Leah Greenblatt awarded the album an A− stating that although it "won't land the band the opening slot on a Coldplay tour", the album "cleaves closer to Person Pitch's more listener-friendly aesthetic". Margaret Wappler of The LA Times stated that the album "shines a light" into the group's "subterranean world of labyrinthine freakadelia, [...] dispens[ing] with most of their creepy vocal tics" in favor of "breezy harmonies."

In their 2009 end of year coverage, UK music magazine Clash named Merriweather Post Pavilion its Album of the Year, publishing an in-depth look at the album and interview with the band's Noah Lennox (a.k.a. Panda Bear). Pitchfork ranked Merriweather Post Pavilion 14 on their Top 200 Albums of the 2000s list and also the Album of the Year for 2009. Spin Magazine ranked it the best album of the year, as did Entertainment Weekly and KEXP. Rolling Stone placed it at 14 on their list and it ranked 30th in The Wire's annual critics' poll. Readers across Canada voted the album the No. 2 experimental and No. 7 electro album of 2009 in Exclaim! magazine. In 2010 and 2013, the album was included in the book 1001 Albums You Must Hear Before You Die.

== Track listing ==
All tracks are written by Animal Collective

No.	Title	Lead vocals	Length
1.	"In the Flowers"	Avey Tare	5:22
2.	"My Girls"	Panda Bear	5:40
3.	"Also Frightened"	Avey Tare; Panda Bear	5:14
4.	"Summertime Clothes"	Avey Tare	4:30
5.	"Daily Routine"	Panda Bear	5:46
6.	"Bluish"	Avey Tare	5:14
7.	"Guys Eyes"	Panda Bear; Avey Tare	4:30
8.	"Taste"	Avey Tare; Panda Bear	3:52
9.	"Lion in a Coma"	Avey Tare	4:12
10.	"No More Runnin'"	Avey Tare	4:24
11.	"Brother Sport"	Panda Bear	6:00
Total length:			54:44

Sample credits

- "Lion in a Coma" features jaw harp samples from "Yitileni" by Madosini.

== Personnel ==
- Avey Tare – vocals, electronics, samples, keys, guitar, percussion
- Panda Bear – vocals, samples, electronics, percussion
- Geologist – electronics, samples
- Ben Allen – engineering, mixing
- Aaron Ersoy – assistant

== Chart positions ==
Chart (2009)	Peak position
Australian Albums Chart	63
Spanish Albums Chart	86
UK Albums Chart	26
US Billboard 200	13
US Top Independent Albums	2

== Ballet Slippers ==
Ballet Slippers

Live album by Animal Collective
- Released: November 22, 2019
- Recorded: May 30, 2009 – June 9, 2009
- Length: 95:21
- Label: Domino
- Producers: Avey Tare, Panda Bear, Geologist

To celebrate Merriweather's 10th anniversary, Animal Collective released Ballet Slippers, a live album consisting of performances from its supporting tour. The live album is notable for being mixed to "reflect a full concert experience", including song transitions and interludes, despite the performances being pulled from different concerts. Although released in support of Merriweather, some songs are from earlier records (e.g. "Lablakely Dress/Fireworks" being a medley of songs from Danse Manatee and Strawberry Jam, respectively).

All tracks are written by Animal Collective

No.	Title	Length
1.	"In The Flowers" (Live June 2, 2009 Boulder, CO)	6:28
2.	"Who Could Win A Rabbit" (Live June 9, 2009 Ft. Lauderdale, FL)	6:03
3.	"Summertime Clothes" (Live June 9, 2009 Ft. Lauderdale, FL)	6:18
4.	"Bleed" (Live May 30, 2009 Las Vegas, NV)	4:52
5.	"Guys Eyes" (Live June 9, 2009 Ft. Lauderdale, FL)	8:24
6.	"My Girls" (Live May 30, 2009 Las Vegas, NV)	6:38
7.	"Banshee Beat" (Live June 2, 2009 Boulder, CO)	10:13
8.	"Lion in a Coma" (Live June 9, 2009 Ft. Lauderdale, FL)	5:10
9.	"No More Runnin'" (Live May 29, 2009 Los Angeles, CA)	4:49
10.	"Lablakely Dress/Fireworks" (Live June 9, 2009 Ft. Lauderdale, FL)	20:12
11.	"Daily Routine" (Live May 30, 2009 Las Vegas, NV)	8:59
12.	"Brother Sport" (Live June 2, 2009 Boulder, CO)	7:15
Total length:		1:35:21
