= Pullhair Rubeye =

Studio album by Avey Tare & Kría Brekkan
- Released: April 24, 2007
- Genre: Experimental
- Length: 33:16
- Label: Paw Tracks

Avey Tare chronology
Hollinndagain (2003)	Pullhair Rubeye (2007)	Down There (2010)

Professional ratings
Aggregate scores
Source	Rating
Metacritic	47/100
Review scores
Source	Rating
AllMusic	3.5/5 stars
Alternative Press	3.5/5 stars
Pitchfork	1.0/10
PopMatters	5/10
Stylus	C
Tiny Mix Tapes	4/5 stars

Pullhair Rubeye is a collaborative studio album released by Animal Collective member Avey Tare and his then-wife Kría Brekkan, formerly of múm. The album was released by Paw Tracks on April 24, 2007 on CD, LP, and digital formats.

== Recording ==
The songs were written in August 2005 in Paris, recorded with guitars and piano on an eight-track during 2006 in their practice space in Brooklyn, and later mixed down on a borrowed two track. Just as both were completing the mix, the two track broke down and they didn’t hear the mixes until two months later when they obtained another two track, being surprised by the recorded sounds.
The album is based on the live set that both played during their shows in 2006 in the US and Iceland, but was released with the songs played backwards, as well as sped up at certain points. According to Portner, the couple made this decision on December 21, 2006, as a result of "a combination of being stuck in NYC for Christmas and seeing that new David Lynch movie".

== Track listing ==
All tracks are written by Avey Tare and Kría Brekkan.

No.	Title	Length
1.	"Sis Around the Sándmill"	3:55
2.	"Opís Helpus"	8:39
3.	"Foetus No-Man"	2:17
4.	"Who Wellses in My Hoff"	4:00
5.	"Lay Lay Off, Faselam"	4:04
6.	"Palenka"	3:06
7.	"Sasong"	3:01
8.	"Was Ónaíp"	4:14
Total length:		33:16
