= Panda Bear (album) =

Studio album by Panda Bear
- Released: June 1, 1999
- Recorded: 1997–1998
- Genre: Electronic, lo-fi, experimental, electroacoustic
- Length: 53:37
- Label: Soccer Star Records
- Producer: Panda Bear, Deakin

Panda Bear chronology
Panda Bear (1999)	Spirit They're Gone, Spirit They've Vanished (2000)

Professional ratings
Review scores
Source	Rating
Pitchfork	6.5/10
Release Magazine	6/10

Panda Bear is the debut solo studio album by American musician Noah Lennox who later became a founding member of Animal Collective. The album was the first use of the Panda Bear moniker which he later continued to use while performing with group. It was released on June 1, 1999, shortly before his 21st birthday on the label Soccer Star Records. The label was formed by himself and fellow future Animal Collective member and childhood friend Deakin (Joshua Dibb) and was initially founded only to release this album. However the label eventually morphed into Animal and then Paw Tracks. This album marks the very first Animal Collective related release, apart from the EP "Paddington Band", which was a recording by the Animal Collective precursor Automine, which featured all other members of the future group except for Lennox himself.

The exact number of compact discs produced is unknown, but can be assumed to be small because the label had no distribution network at the time. It was likely paid out of pocket by Lennox and Dibb themselves. The aforementioned factors as well as lack of awareness and interest led to the album becoming out of print.

Lennox commented on the possibility of a reissue in 2004.

There's like two or three songs that I guess I still like on that album but I feel like such a different person now. It's not that I'm not proud of it, or that I don't believe in it, but I'm not so excited about it that I feel like I need to reissue it and get it out to a whole bunch of other people who haven't heard it.

== Background and development ==
Lennox became interested in electronic music and other forms of experimental music as a teenager. Feeling inspired, he began recording compositions of his own to tape under the name "Panda Bear". He chose the name because he began drawing pictures of his favorite animals, pandas, on the tapes. These recordings became the structure of the eventual album.

Lennox commented on his approach to making the record in 2004.

I kind of feel like I didn't even have a concept of what an album was back then, for the first one, when I was 15, 16, 17, 18 or so. I just put songs together that I liked at the time.

== Track listing ==
1. "Inside a Great Stadium and a Running Race" (5:49)
2. "Mich mit einer Mond" (translates to "Me with one moon", improper German) (4:10)
3. "On the Farm" (4:00)
4. "Ohne Titel" (Untitled) (2:38)
5. "Fire!" (2:44)
6. "O Please Bring Her Back" (3:35)
7. "Ain't Got No Troubles" (3:59)
8. "Winter in St. Moritz" (2:13)
9. "Liebe auf den Ersten Blick" (Love at first sight) (4:41)
10. "A Musician and a Filmmaker" (4:30)
11. "We Built a Robot" (3:16)
12. "Sometimes When It Hurts Bad Enough It Feels Like This" (4:01)
13. "A Lover Once Can No Longer Now Be a Friend" (5:11)
14. "Ohne Titel" (Untitled) (2:50)

== Personnel ==
- Panda Bear – vocals, Roland TB-303, acoustic and electric guitars, Korg 01/W, piano, cello
