= Person Pitch =

Studio album by Panda Bear
- Released: March 20, 2007
- Recorded: Lisbon, Portugal
- Genres: Psychedelic pop; avant-pop; sampledelia; experimental pop; post-rock
- Length: 45:36
- Label: Paw Tracks
- Producer: Panda Bear

Panda Bear chronology
| Young Prayer (2004) | Person Pitch (2007) | Tomboy (2011) |

Singles from Person Pitch
- 1. "I'm Not/Comfy in Nautica" Released: September 22, 2005; 2. "Bros" Released: September 4, 2006; 3. "Carrots" Released: January 23, 2007; 4. "Take Pills" Released: June 19, 2007

Person Pitch is the third studio album by American recording artist Noah Lennox under his alias Panda Bear, released on March 20, 2007, by Paw Tracks. Departing stylistically from his prior work as both a member of Animal Collective and a solo artist, the album was recorded using the Boss SP-303 sampler, with instrumentation largely composed of manipulated samples and loops, accompanied by Lennox's layered vocals. He described it as a collection of "super dubby and old sounding" songs inspired by his then-recent marriage, fatherhood, and move to Portugal.

The album was met with universal critical acclaim, and later ranked among various "top 10 albums of the 2000s" lists. It is noted for influencing a wide range of subsequent indie music, including the chillwave genre and numerous soundalike acts. Five of the album's seven tracks were issued as A-sided singles before the album's release: "I'm Not" and "Comfy in Nautica" (2005), "Bros" (2006), "Carrots" and "Take Pills" (2007).

== Background and recording ==
Lennox recorded Person Pitch over a two-year period, working slowly because he lacked large stretches of time to dedicate to the material in between tours with Animal Collective. In response to this, he entertained the idea of releasing a series of 12-inch singles over time which would then eventually be compiled into a singles album, a practice inspired by dance producers such as Basic Channel. Initially, Lennox wanted to name it Perfect Pitch before settling on Person Pitch – "pitch being sound and person being a person with person pitch being a sound of a person." He attributed the brighter sound of the project to his move to Lisbon, Portugal and recent familial developments, saying:

A lot of the songs on Person Pitch are kind of sugary. [...] It's really mellow and sunny here [in Portugal] and I feel like the album really sounds like that to me. Also the stuff that's happened to me in the past two years, like getting married and having a kid and all that, has had a pretty profound impact on the kind of music I play and the kind of subjects I address. My approach to being a musician has drastically changed from having a kid and being a provider.

When Lennox moved to Lisbon, he was initially unable to bring his guitar into the country after it was held up in customs. He was, however, able to bring a Boss SP-303 sampler which he had been experimenting with in previous months, inspired by the work of hip hop producer Madlib. As a result, the album is primarily composed of samples. Lennox estimates that "it's like 96% samples, 10% of which I actually played," with most taken from songs heard on the radio or short recordings found on the Internet. Sampled sources include a track by singer Kylie Minogue, a rondeau by the 14th-century composer Guillaume de Machaut, a dub reggae production by Lee "Scratch" Perry, and 1960s instrumental group the Tornados performing "Popeye Twist." When working with samples of other material, he "tried pretty hard to hide the stuff or make it my own in some way" by applying elements such as effects and EQ treatments, and he developed melodies as he played these samples. Despite his previous drumming with Animal Collective, Lennox did not perform drums on the album.

== Music ==
Person Pitch departs from the guitar-based sound and loosely rock-oriented format of Lennox's previous work, both as a member of Animal Collective and on his solo releases. Instead it is constructed primarily out of "carefully mapped-out samples, minimal beats, and endless layers of his own reverb-saturated vocal harmonies." The Sydney Morning Herald noted elements such as “watery electronics, washed-out samples and Beach Boys-y vocals,” while AllMusic characterized the album as a "patchwork" of "repurposed samples" and dense vocal layers." Slant called attention to the influence of dance and electronic music production techniques on the album. Spin described it as "steeped in '60s-style harmony and post-rock noise," and "mash[ing] up traces of the Beach Boys with digital burbles, elevator chimes, and something that sounds like bubble wrap being popped." Entertainment Weekly also noted influences from the "sunny California sound of the Beach Boys/Mamas and the Papas era [...] filtered through a playful avant-garde sieve." Critic Simon Reynolds described its style as "a unique and refreshing sound [made] almost entirely out of percussion and his own multi-tracked voice," noting the influence of Lennox's "teenage years singing in a high school choir."

Lennox himself described the songs in advance as "super dubby and old sounding, like Motown or Buddy Holly just a little bit." He acknowledged the Beach Boys as a partial influence on his vocals, but stated that "I feel like if you do multi-part vocal harmonies you're gonna get that no matter what, especially if you put a bunch of reverb on it or make it sound kind of spacey. [...] I certainly don't want to sound like anybody else if I can." He invoked his time in a high school chamber choir as another influence.

== Artwork and release ==
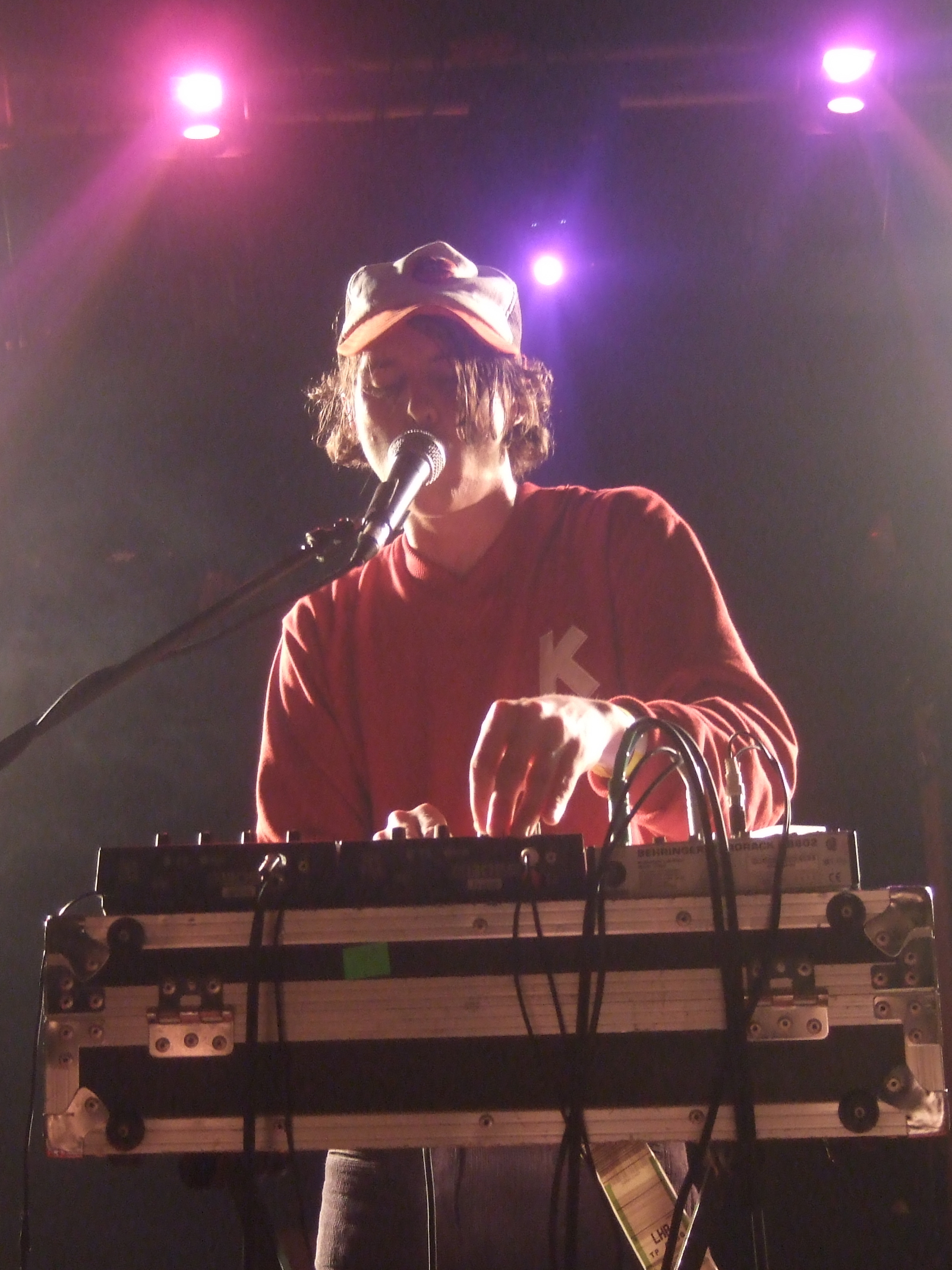
Lennox performing in 2007

The artwork for Person Pitch and all of the related singles were done by Agnes Montgomery. The album cover artwork is a doctored version of a photo that originally appeared in an August 1969 issue of National Geographic. According to Lennox, "Initially I knew I wanted to do something that was really symmetrical. The album is kind of symmetrical in terms of how long the songs are, and I wanted the album art to reflect that." Included in the artwork was a long list of artists who Lennox credited with influencing him.

Five of the seven tracks on the album were released prior to the album, some of them with different mixing and/or lengths.

- "I'm Not" and "Comfy in Nautica" were released together as a double A-side single in 2005.
- "Bros" was released as a single on Fat Cat Records in late 2006.
- "Good Girl / Carrots" was released in early 2007 on a split 12" with the band Excepter via Animal Collective's own label Paw Tracks (on the single, the song is called, simply, "Carrots").
- "Search for Delicious" was featured in 2005 on Volume 14 of music magazine Comes With a Smile's CD compilations.
- "Take Pills" was released as a 7" single on June 19, 2007. The B-side contains the non-album track "Bonfire of the Vanities"

Despite Lennox's initial assertion that Person Pitch would be issued only on CD, it was announced shortly after its release that it would in fact be pressed on vinyl; the double LP was released on June 19. As of 2011, sales in the US had exceeded 74,000 copies, according to Nielsen SoundScan. In 2017, online record club Vinyl Me, Please. reissued the album on colored vinyl to commemorate the album's 10th anniversary.

== Singles ==
=== I'm Not / Comfy in Nautica ===
I'm Not / Comfy in Nautica

"I'm Not"/"Comfy in Nautica" is the first solo single by Panda Bear, released in 2005. The single is a double A-side, and both tracks appear on Person Pitch. The song "I'm Not" samples the rondeau Rose, liz, printemps, verdure by Guillaume de Machaut, recorded by the early music vocal group Gothic Voices (on their album The Mirror of Narcissus). "Comfy in Nautica", which contains a sample of the song "Jisas Yu Holem Hand Blong Mi" from The Thin Red Line soundtrack, was #74 on Rolling Stone's list of the 100 Best Songs of 2007. Tracks were:

1. "I'm Not"
2. "Comfy in Nautica"

== Critical reception ==
Professional ratings
Aggregate scores
| Source | Rating |
|---|---|
| Metacritic | 87/100 |
Review scores
| Source | Rating |
| AllMusic | 5/5 stars |
| The A.V. Club | A− |
| Entertainment Weekly | A− |
| The Guardian | 4/5 stars |
| The Observer | 5/5 stars |
| Pitchfork | 9.4/10 |
| Q | 4/5 stars |
| Rolling Stone | 3.5/5 stars |
| Slant Magazine | 4.5/5 stars |
| Spin | 3/5 stars |

Person Pitch was met with almost unanimously positive reviews from music critics. On Metacritic, which assigns a normalized rating out of 100 based on professional critic reviews, the album received an 87, indicating "universal acclaim". Writing in The Observer, Simon Reynolds described the album's sound as "tribal, ecstatic yet eerie, brimming with child-like wonder," and felt that Lennox successfully "pulls off the trick of being simultaneously poppy and abstract". Kevin O'Donnell of Rolling Stone felt that the album "proves he's a first-rate solo artist," and described the album as "a marvelous, hazy trip full of Beach Boys-inspired psychedelia." Leah Greenblatt of Entertainment Weekly described the album as a "lovely, trippy kaleidoscope of sound." Mark Richardson of Pitchfork felt that Noah Lennox's use of pop melodies gives Person Pitch "an appeal that extends beyond just Animal Collective fans" but that the incorporation of sampled loops and instruments in the production gives the album's songs an "unusual twist".

Slant Magazine's Jonathan Keefe praised Person Pitch as "a striking, ambitious take on pop music". Drowned in Sound writer Richard MacFarlane complimented Lennox's "masterful" production on Person Pitch, stating that "these psychedelic hymns and schizophrenic nursery rhymes sound unreal, otherworldly." Phillip Buchan of PopMatters called the album the "most sonically satisfying statement to emerge yet from the Collective", though he was less complimentary towards its lyrics, which he felt lacked a "representational capacity" to "show us anything outside our selves." Retrospectively, Fred Thomas of AllMusic credits Person Pitch as the album where "the wildly different places Lennox would take his experiments truly found a voice of their own", standing as "a perfectly executed statement for Lennox, and in at least some circles of indie rock, a musical revelation."

Person Pitch was named the top album of 2007 by Pitchfork and placed at number 13 on The Village Voice's Pazz & Jop year-end critics' poll. A Pitchfork year-end survey included praise and recognition from musicians such as Bradford Cox, The Tough Alliance, Diplo, St. Vincent, Black Dice, Christopher Bear of Grizzly Bear, Vampire Weekend, Yeasayer and Dan Snaith, all of whom ranked Person Pitch as one of the best albums of 2007. Pitchfork would later name Person Pitch the ninth best album of the decade. In 2016, Grimes named the album in her list "5 albums that changed my life". She said that "suddenly all music clicked into place and seemed so simple and easy. I was pretty much able to spontaneously write songs immediately after listening to this album once." In 2019, Pitchfork described the album as "a collagist classic of sidelong Beach Boys-isms and kitchen-sink sonics that sits firmly in the sampledelic canon." The Line of Best Fit stated that Lennox won "wild acclaim and admiration for the album’s groundbreaking combo of cutting edge sampledelica and heavily Beach Boys-influenced dream pop" while "the newfound emphasis on electronics also had a huge impact on the output of Lennox’s day job Animal Collective," influencing their 2009 album Merriweather Post Pavilion.

== Track listing ==
All tracks are written by Noah Lennox.

| No. | Title | Length |
|---|---|---|
| 1. | "Comfy in Nautica" | 4:04 |
| 2. | "Take Pills" | 5:23 |
| 3. | "Bros" | 12:30 |
| 4. | "I'm Not" | 3:59 |
| 5. | "Good Girl/Carrots" | 12:42 |
| 6. | "Search for Delicious" | 4:53 |
| 7. | "Ponytail" | 2:05 |
| Total length: | | 45:36 |

Vinyl edition

Side one
| No. | Title | Length |
|---|---|---|
| 1. | "Comfy in Nautica" | 4:04 |
| 2. | "Take Pills" | 5:23 |

Side two
| No. | Title | Length |
|---|---|---|
| 1. | "Bros" | 12:30 |

Side three
| No. | Title | Length |
|---|---|---|
| 1. | "Good Girl/Carrots" | 12:42 |

Side four
| No. | Title | Length |
|---|---|---|
| 1. | "I'm Not" | 3:59 |
| 2. | "Search for Delicious" | 4:53 |
| 3. | "Ponytail" | 2:05 |

== Influences ==
The following artists are listed in the liner notes as influences for Person Pitch. About the decision to put this list in the booklet, Lennox said:

since I was sampling so many different people I thought it was appropriate to give thanks to other musicians. I'd never really done that before ... [specific influences] was always kind of a difficult question for me to answer. So this time I was like, I'll really try to think about what I feel led me to make this kind of music and give respect to those people.

- Air
- Horace Andy
- Aphex Twin
- Basement Jaxx
- Syd Barrett
- Basic Channel
- The Beatles
- The Beach Boys
- Chris Bell
- Benjamin Diamond
- Black Dice
- Black Flag
- Black Sabbath
- Vashti Bunyan
- Can
- Maria Callas
- The Chills
- The Clientele
- Phil Collins
- Sam Cooke
- CNN
- Daft Punk
- Dettinger
- Doce
- Dr. Dre
- Duran Duran
- Echo and the Bunnymen
- ELO
- Enya
- Eric B. & Rakim
- Everly Brothers
- Everything but the Girl
- The Equals
- The Free Design
- Gang Starr
- Ghostface Killah
- Grateful Dead
- Markus Guentner
- Hall and Oates
- Moodymann
- Robert Hood
- Incredible String Band
- Isolée
- Metallica
- Michael Jackson
- Jay Dee
- Jay-Z
- Tom Jobim
- Carsten Jost
- Kaito
- The Kinks
- King Tubby
- Kraftwerk
- Cyndi Lauper
- Louvin Brothers
- Love
- Luomo
- Madlib
- Bob Marley
- George Michael
- Kylie Minogue
- Joni Mitchell
- Ennio Morricone
- Harry Mudie
- Nas
- Neu
- New Order
- Nico
- Nirvana
- Notorious B.I.G.
- ODB
- Bjorn Olsson
- The Orb
- Roy Orbison
- Lee Perry
- Phoenix
- Linda Perhacs
- Ariel Pink
- Pink Floyd
- The Police
- Portishead
- Queen
- Jonathan Richman
- Pete Rock
- S.E. Rogie
- SRC
- The Stooges
- Ride
- Arthur Russell
- Erik Satie
- Nina Simone
- Skip Spence
- Cat Stevens
- Talk Talk
- The Tornados
- Salz
- Spacemen 3
- Sparks
- The Strokes
- Theorem
- Antonio Variacoes
- Caetano Veloso
- Ricardo Villalobos
- Wolfgang Voigt
- Scott Walker
- Wu-Tang Clan
- The Zombies

== Personnel ==
Credits adapted from the liner notes of Person Pitch.

=== Technical personnel ===
- Panda Bear – production, mixing
- Rusty Santos – mixing
- Alan Douches – mastering

=== Artwork ===
- Agnes Montgomery – artwork
- Rob Carmichael – layout

== Charts ==
| Chart (2007) | Peak position |
|---|---|
| UK Independent Albums (Official Charts) | 36 |
| US Heatseekers Albums (Billboard) | 16 |
| US Independent Albums (Billboard) | 38 |

== Accolades ==
Person Pitch
| Publication | Accolade | Year | Rank |
|---|---|---|---|
| Pitchfork | Top 50 Albums of 2007 | 2007 | 1 |
| Pitchfork | The Top 200 Albums of the 2000s | 2009 | 9 |
| Obscure Sound | Best Albums of 2007 | 2007 | 24 |
| About.com | Top 20 Albums of 2007 | 2007 | 2 |
| Resident Advisor | Top 100 Albums of the '00s | 2009 | 84 |
| Gorilla vs. Bear | 2000–2009 | 2009 | 1 |
| Stereogum | Best Album of the '00s | | 9 |
| Stylus Magazine | Top 50 Albums of 2007 | 2007 | 3 |
| The Wire | Top 50 Records of the Year | 2007 | 3 |

"Bros"
| Publication | Accolade | Year | Rank |
|---|---|---|---|
| Pitchfork Media | Top 100 Tracks of 2007 | 2007 | 3 |
| Pitchfork Media | The Top 500 Tracks of the 2000s | 2009 | 48 |

"Comfy in Nautica"
| Publication | Accolade | Year | Rank |
|---|---|---|---|
| Rolling Stone | 100 Best Songs Of 2007 | 2007 | 74 |
| Pitchfork Media | The Top 500 Tracks of The 2000s | 2009 | 132 |
