= Bro's (song) =

"Bros"

Single by Panda Bear

from the album Person Pitch
- Released: December 4, 2006
- Genre: Psychedelic pop; neo-psychedelia; progressive pop
- Length: 12:31
- Label: Fat Cat Records
- Songwriter(s): Panda Bear

Panda Bear singles chronology
"I'm Not/Comfy in Nautica" (2005)	"Bros" (2006)	"Carrots" (2007)

"Bros" is the second single from Panda Bear's 2007 album Person Pitch. It was named the third best song of 2007 by Pitchfork Media.

== Composition ==
AllMusic called the song the "album centerpiece" of Person Pitch, describing it as "a 12-minute collage of chiming guitar arpeggios, stony vocal harmonies, hooting owls, and phasing loops that fade in and out of each other." Pitchfork Media wrote that "from sighing multi-tracked vocals to jewel-box loops to caramelized guitar riffs, each layer adds hypnotic depth to a song whose gorgeousness seems dangerously excessive from the start."

== Accolades ==
"Bros"
Publication	Accolade	Year	Rank
Pitchfork Media	Top 100 Tracks of 2007	2007	3
Pitchfork Media	The Top 500 Tracks of the 2000s	2009	48

== Track listing ==
1. "Bros"
2. "Bros (Terrestrial Tones Mix)"
