= Jane (American band) =

American former band

- Genres: Experimental; Electronic; Ambient
- Years active: 2002–2007
- Labels: Paw Tracks, Psych-o-path Records
- Members: Noah Lennox; Scott Mou

Jane was an electronic duo consisting of Panda Bear (Noah Lennox) of Animal Collective and Scott Mou. The two worked together at Other Music and recorded and practiced at Mou's house.

== Discography ==
=== Albums ===
- Paradise (2002, self-released)
- COcOnuts (2002, self-released, Psych-o-path records)
- Berserker (2005, Paw Tracks)
