= Down There (album) =

Studio album by Avey Tare
- Released: October 14, 2010
- Recorded: June 2010
- Studio: Good House, New York
- Length: 34:44
- Label: Paw Tracks

Avey Tare chronology
Pullhair Rubeye (2007)	Down There (2010)	Eucalyptus (2017)

Professional ratings
Review scores
Source	Rating
AllMusic	4/5 stars
BLARE Magazine	3/5 stars
Clash	8/10 stars
Consequence of Sound	4.5/5 stars
Pitchfork	(7.9/10)
Spin	7/10 stars
Uncut	4/5 stars

Down There is the debut solo album by Animal Collective member Avey Tare (David Portner), released worldwide on October 25, 2010, on Paw Tracks. The album was recorded in June with Animal Collective bandmate Josh Dibb (credited as Conrad Deaken) at the Good House, an old church in upstate New York. "Lucky 1" was officially released for download as the first single on October 5, 2010.

== Track listing ==
No.	Title	Length
1.	"Laughing Hieroglyphic"	6:49
2.	"3 Umbrellas"	2:43
3.	"Oliver Twist"	4:19
4.	"Glass Bottom Boat"	1:42
5.	"Ghost of Books"	4:48
6.	"Cemeteries"	4:07
7.	"Heads Hammock"	3:35
8.	"Heather in the Hospital"	3:18
9.	"Lucky 1"	3:23
