= Eric Copeland =

American rock musician (born 1978)

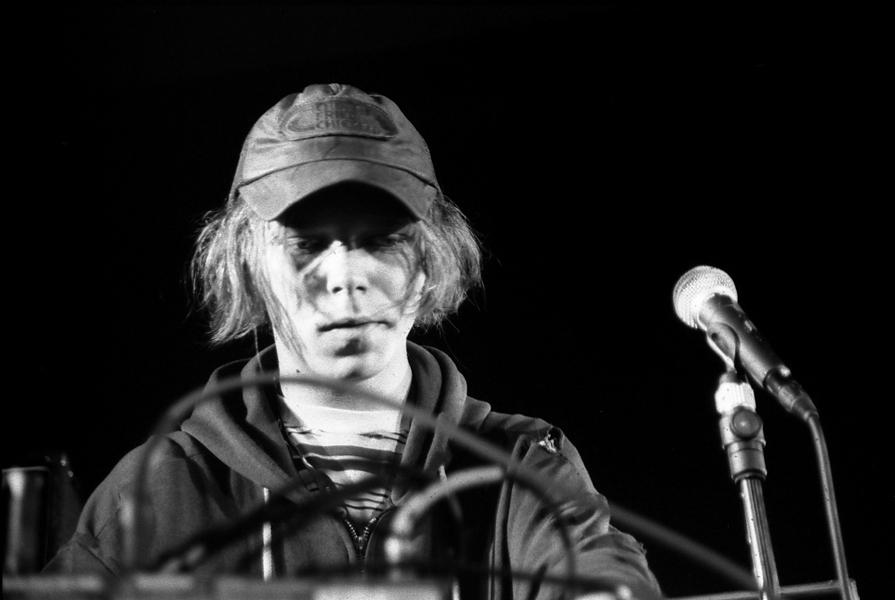
- Eric Copeland performing with Black Dice at All Tomorrow's Parties in 2004

Background information
- Born: 1978 (age 47–48); Brunswick, Maine, United States
- Genre: Avant-pop
- Labels: Underwater Peoples, Paw Tracks, Catsup Plate

Eric Copeland (born 1978 in Brunswick, Maine, United States) is an American experimental musician based in New York City. He is a core member of Black Dice and forms half of the duo Terrestrial Tones with Animal Collective's Avey Tare. Copeland uses a variety of instruments and effects but largely focuses his work on vocal sounds, primitive sampling and looping techniques, and delay manipulation.

Copeland released his first solo effort, Hermaphrodite, in 2007 on the Paw Tracks label. His next LP, Alien in a Garbage Dump, released in August 2009, is composed of songs from his EPs Alien in a Garbage Dump and Al Anon. In 2009, Copeland self-released the CD-R Rgag EP.

He was chosen by Animal Collective to perform at the All Tomorrow's Parties festival that they curated in May 2011.

In 2012, he teamed up with Underwater Peoples Records to release his album, Limbo. His latest album, Dumb It Down, was released in September 2020 on Post Present Media.

== Discography ==
- Hermaphrodite (2007, Paw Tracks / PPM Records)
- Alien in a Garbage Dump EP (2008, Paw Tracks)
- Al Anon (Catsup Plate)
- Rgag CDR EP (2009, self-released)
- Alien in a Garbage Dump (2009, Paw Tracks)
- Alladin 7" (Fusetron)
- Doo Doo Run 7" (2010, PPM Records)
- Strange Days (2010, PPM Records)
- Puerto Rican 7" (PPM Records)
- Waco Taco Combo (2011, Escho)
- Whorehouse Blues 7" (2011, PPM Records)
- B.Y.O.B 7" collaboration with DJ Dog Dick (2012, EAC)
- Get Along 7" (2012, PPM Records)
- Bi 7" collaboration with Jimi Hey (2012, Mexican Summer)
- Limbo (2012, Underwater Peoples)
- Flushing Meats 7" (2012, Calico Corp)
- Masterbater 12" (2013, DFA)
- Joke in the Hole (2013, DFA)
- Ms Pretzel (2014, DFA)
- Logo My Ego (2014, L.I.E.S.)
- Jesus Freak (2015, L.I.E.S.)
- Black Bubblegum (2016, DFA)
- Brooklyn Banks (2016, Palmetto Arts)
- Courtesy, Professionalism, Respect (2016, L.I.E.S.)
- Goofballs (2017, DFA)
- Trogg Modal, Vol. 1 (2018, DFA)
- Trogg Modal Vol. 2 (2019, DFA)
- Dumb It Down (2020, PPM Records)
- Spiral Stairs (2022, Les Albums Claus)
