= Panda Bear (musician) =

American musician (born 1978)

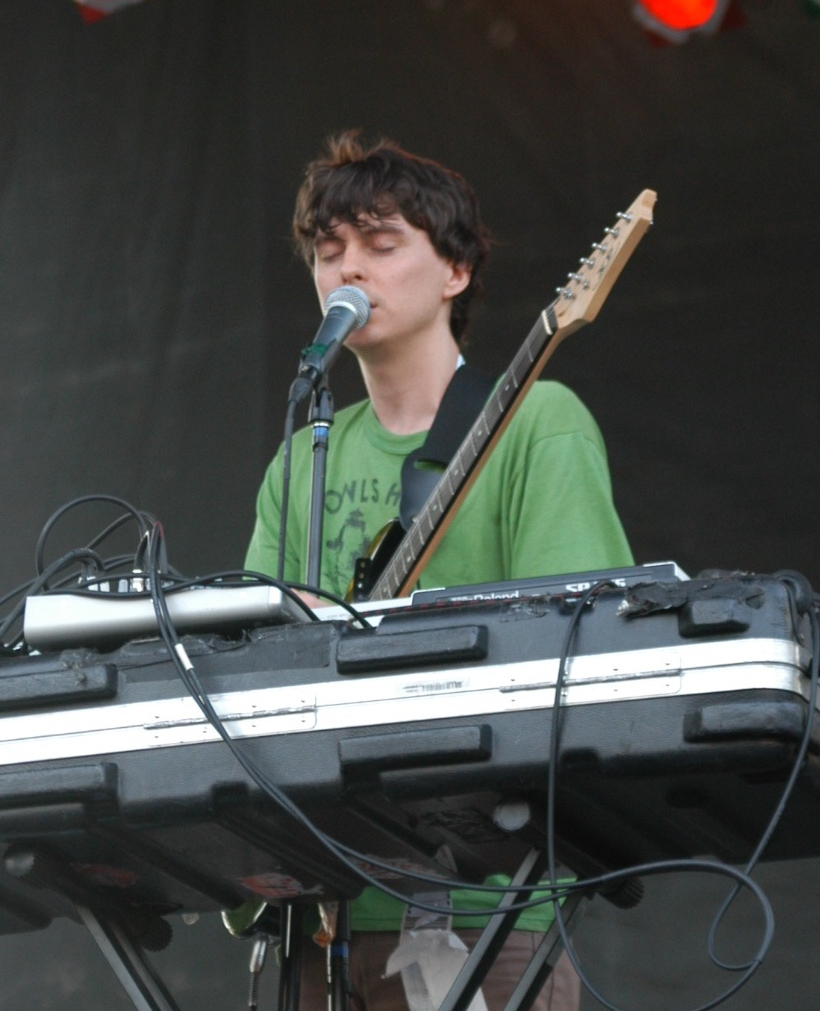
- Lennox performing in 2010

Background information
- Born: Noah Benjamin Lennox; July 17, 1978 (age 48); Charlottesville, Virginia, U.S.
- Origin: Baltimore, Maryland, U.S.
- Genres: Psychedelic pop; electronic
- Occupation: Musician
- Instruments: Vocals; drums; percussion; sampler; guitar; synthesizer
- Years active: 1998–present
- Labels: Paw Tracks; FatCat; Domino; Mistletone; Catsup Plate; St. Ives; UAAR; Soccer Star; Outside
- Spouses: Fernanda Pereira (m. 2004; div. 2023) Rivka Ravede (m. 2026)
- Website: pandabearofficial.com

Noah Benjamin Lennox (born July 17, 1978), known by his stage name Panda Bear, is an American musician, singer-songwriter, multi-instrumentalist, and co-founding member of the band Animal Collective, with whom he started collaborating in the late 1990s. He has also released six solo LPs since 1999 under the name of Panda Bear, including Person Pitch (2007), Tomboy (2011) and Panda Bear Meets the Grim Reaper (2015) (the latter two both reaching the Billboard 200. Lennox has also collaborated with other artists, including Daft Punk on their 2013 single "Doin' It Right", Dean Blunt on his song "9", Braxe + Falcon on their 2020 single "Step by Step", and Sonic Boom on the albums Reset and A? of When.

== Early life and education ==
Lennox grew up in the Roland Park section of Baltimore, Maryland. He attended the Waldorf School of Baltimore through 8th grade, and Kimberton Waldorf School in Chester County, Pennsylvania, for high school. His family moved frequently during his early years, owing to his father's studies to be an orthopedic surgeon.

Growing up, Lennox played sports, mainly soccer and basketball. His brother, Matt Lennox (whom the Animal Collective song "Brother Sport" is about), was a leading player on the high school basketball team; Noah was also a team member, playing as point guard.

Lennox has stated in interviews that he enjoyed drawing a lot as a teenager, especially pandas. His moniker Panda Bear came from this habit of drawing pandas on his early mixtapes as a teenager. He also studied piano until he was eight, followed by cello. He sang tenor in his high school chamber choir.

Though he and his family have never been very religious, Lennox briefly attended Boston University (alongside his friend and future bandmate Josh Dibb), where he majored in religion because of his interest in "the concept of God". One summer he went to New York to visit his girlfriend, and decided not to return to university again.

== Career ==
=== Animal Collective ===
As a teen, Lennox began listening to electronic music styles such as house and techno, and artists such as Aphex Twin, all of which became a major influence on his later work. He recorded and performed music solo and with friends.

Lennox had been friends with Deakin (Josh Dibb) since 1986 when they were aged eight, in school in the second grade. Deakin introduced Lennox to his high school friends Avey Tare (Dave Portner) and Geologist (Brian Weitz). For years, the four of them swapped homemade recordings, shared musical ideas and performed in different group configurations. Lennox, along with Deakin moved to New York in 2000. The band then began collaborating and they settled on the name "Animal Collective".

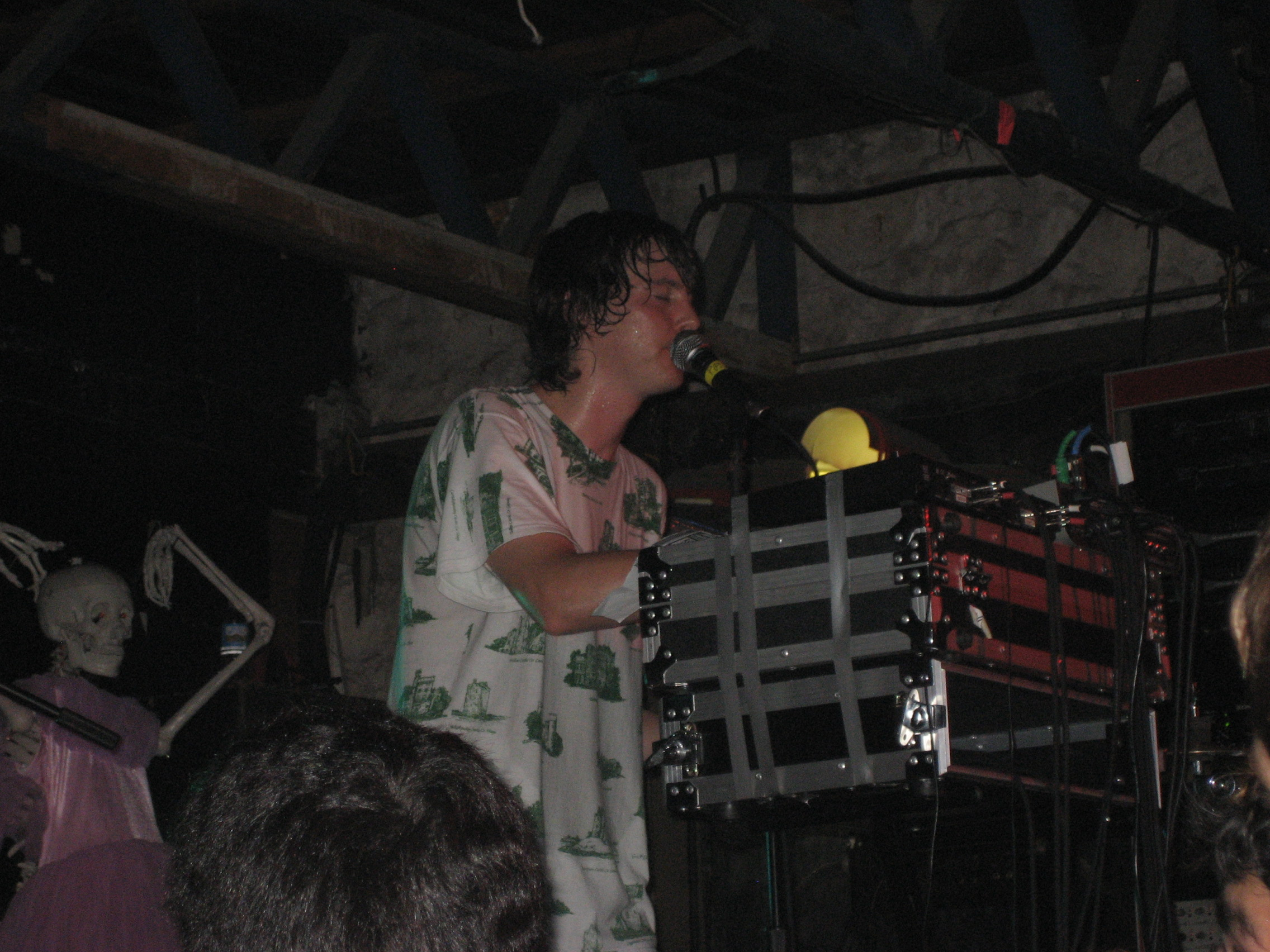
Lennox performing with Animal Collective in 2007

Lennox has named Black Dice, who the band first toured with, as a major influence stating: "I feel like the wisest things I've learned about being in a band I learned by watching them" and that he personally sees them "as a model for a band." Lennox also describes recording a track with Arto Lindsay in 2002 as a formative moment, having been the first time recording with an established artist in a professional studio.

Lennox has sung, played drums and occasionally guitar in Animal Collective's live performances. He cites Stewart Copeland as the biggest influence on his drumming style. For his drumming work on Animal Collective's 2022 album Time Skiffs, Lennox cited James Brown's drummers, especially Clyde Stubblefield, as influences. Since the 2007 releases of Panda Bear's Person Pitch and Animal Collective's Strawberry Jam, Lennox has focused more on using samplers and other electronics in Animal Collective shows.

=== Solo work ===
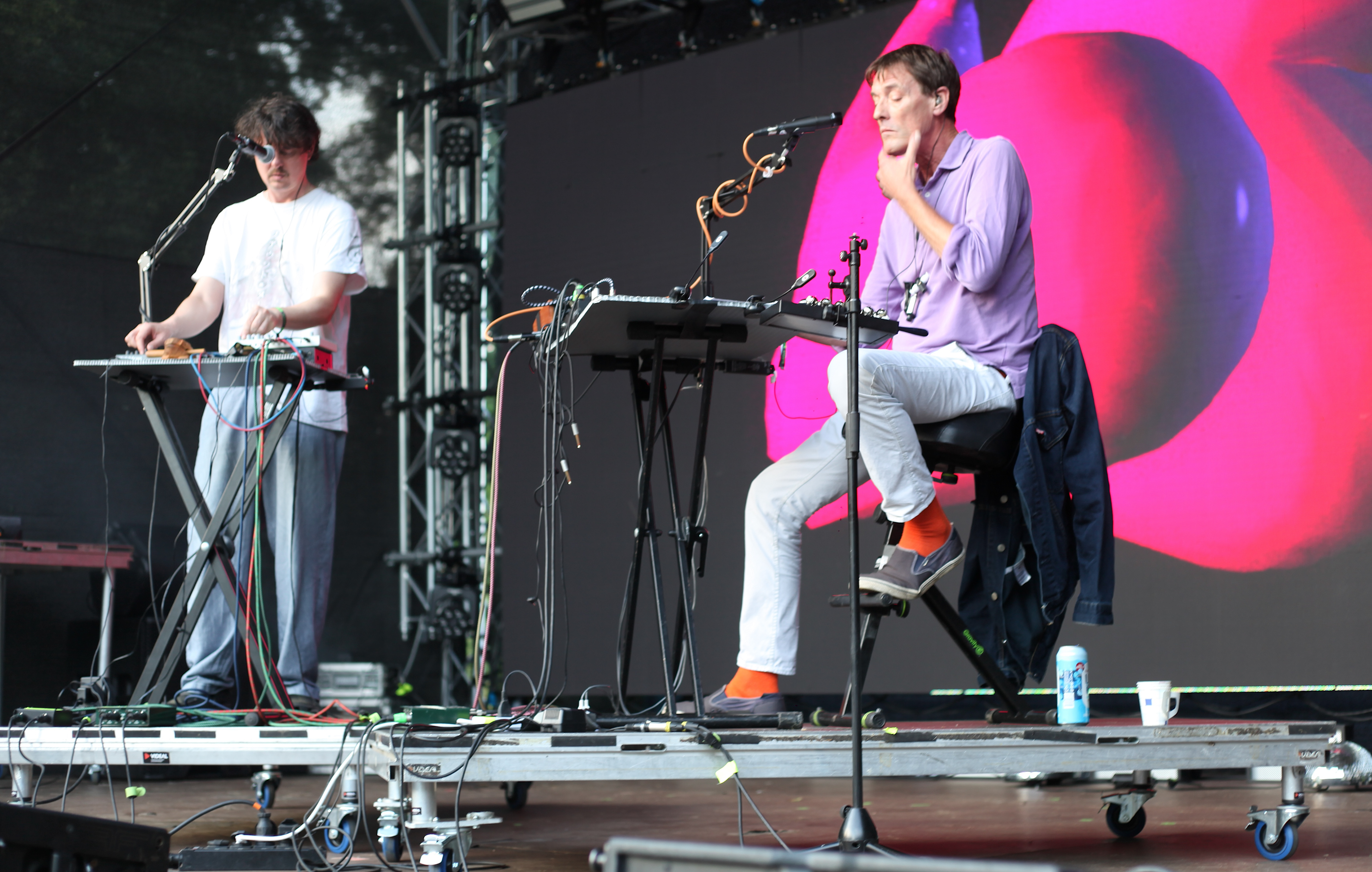
Lennox (left) and Sonic Boom (Peter Kember, right) performing at KiKuMu festival in Jäneda, Estonia (July 2026)

Lennox's early musical influences included electronic music, and his solo work has been characterized as experimental pop, electronic, bedroom pop, neo-psychedelic pop, and indie music. The Line of Best Fit called him a "psychedelic pop trailblazer."

Lennox's debut album Panda Bear was released in 1999 on Soccer Star Records. After focusing more on touring and recording with Animal Collective, he released the follow-up Young Prayer in 2004.

In 2007, Lennox released his highly acclaimed third solo album Person Pitch. Of his songwriting style, Lennox says "I get impatient writing songs, I can't spend more than a couple of hours before I get frustrated. So I got to kind of spit it out real fast. My favorite songs are the ones where I worked really really fast on, when it comes all out in like two hours or something." Lennox was surprised about the positive reception and success of the album. It was written in Lisbon soon after moving there, using a limited setup including a laptop and sampler.

During a brief European tour in January 2010, Lennox played three shows consisting almost entirely of new material. On March 7, 2010, a tour setlist with titles for ten of the new songs was posted on Panda Bear's MySpace blog. He also played Primavera Sound Festival in 2010. The single "Tomboy" and the b-side "Slow Motion" were released in July 2010. It was announced in August that singles "You Can Count on Me" and "Alsatian Darn" would be released via Domino on September 28. The limited 500 copies of "You Can Count On Me" sold out in less than a day. The single "Last Night at the Jetty" was released December 2010. The single "Surfer's Hymn" was released March 28, 2011.

On 12 April 2011, Lennox released his fourth album under Panda Bear, Tomboy, on his own label, Paw Tracks. He had started performing material from the album from 5 December 2008 at a show with No Age in Miami, Florida.

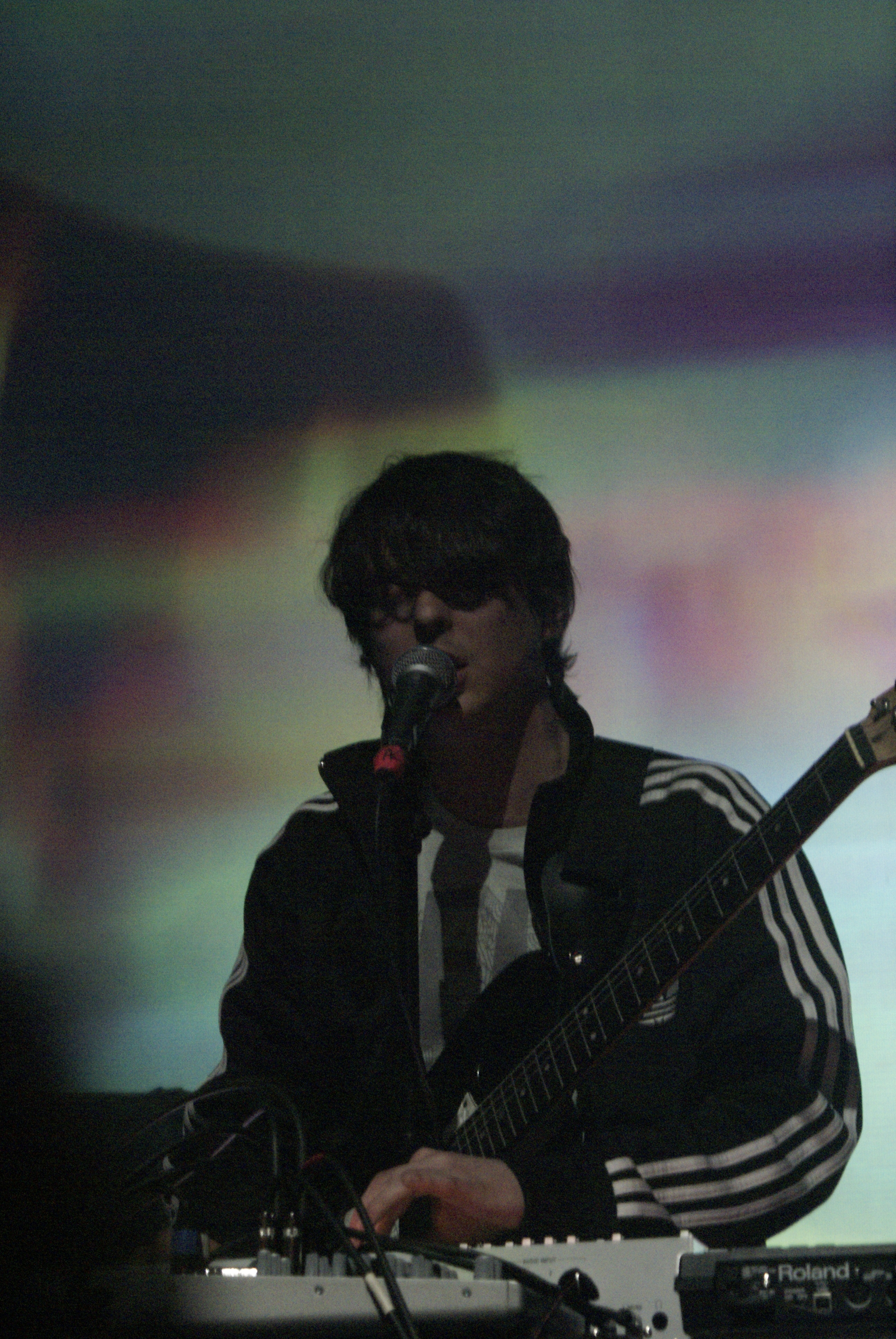
Lennox performing in Paris in 2010

Lennox was chosen by Jeff Mangum of Neutral Milk Hotel to perform at the All Tomorrow's Parties festival he planned to curate in December 2011 in Minehead, England. However, Lennox was unable to play when the event was rescheduled to March 2012.

In June 2013, Panda Bear performed a set of all new material at ATP.

In October 2014, the Mr Noah EP was released, featuring four new songs. The full album, Panda Bear Meets the Grim Reaper, was released in January 2015.

In 2018, Lennox released the vinyl-only A Day With the Homies EP, a collection of five songs heavily influenced by house + bass music. Included on the packaging of the release were hidden URLs that pointed to samples used on the EP. In February 2019, he released the LP Buoys, featuring production work by longtime collaborator Rusty Santos. It was preceded by the single "Dolphin".

On February 28, 2025, Lennox released his seventh solo album, Sinister Grift. Inspired by his recent divorce from his longterm partner Fernanda Pereira, the album was recorded in close collaboration with his Animal Collective bandmate Deakin. It was preceded by the singles, "Defense", "Ferry Lady" and "Ends Meet".

=== Collaborations ===
From 2002 to 2007, Lennox played in the band Jane with DJ Scott Mou. He has also performed on tracks with Atlas Sound (Bradford Cox of Deerhunter), Ducktails (Matt Mondanile, formerly of Real Estate), Dean Blunt, and many electronic musicians, including Zomby, Pantha du Prince, Flume, and Jamie xx.

Lennox (with Animal Collective) had initially made contact with the French electronic music duo Daft Punk asking them if they wanted to remix the track "My Girls". Whilst the duo said they liked the track, they declined, saying they did not like to do remixes. However, they stayed in email contact. Later, Panda Bear appeared on Daft Punk's track "Doin' It Right" on their 2013 album Random Access Memories. The album won Daft Punk the Grammy Award for Album of the Year in 2014, making Panda Bear a co-winner. Almost a decade later, in 2022, Lennox worked with previous Daft Punk collaborators Alan Braxe and DJ Falcon on their new duo's debut single, "Step by Step".

In 2019, Lennox contributed to singer Solange's album When I Get Home, providing backing vocals on several tracks and co-producing the song "Binz".

==== Panda Bear and Sonic Boom ====
In 2022, Lennox and producer Peter Kember aka Sonic Boom (who previously co-produced Tomboy and Panda Bear Meets the Grim Reaper) released the collaborative album Reset. This was followed by a full remix album by dub producer Adrian Sherwood called Reset In Dub in 2023, as well as the Reset Mariachi EP in 2024, which featured Spanish-language mariachi reworks of songs from Reset with the group Mariachi 2000 de Cutberto Pérez.

In 2026, Lennox and Kember announced their second collaborative album, A ? of WHEN, featuring contributions from Daniel O'Sullivan and harpist Mary Lattimore. The album will not be made available on streaming services – in a statement, the duo explained "...there’s no streaming, no videos, and a minimisation of online everything. Going forward we’re looking to radio, live shows, listening parties, Q&A sessions & real life interactions to get back to a place we feel makes more sense."

== Personal life ==
Lennox met his ex-wife, the fashion designer Fernanda Pereira, in Lisbon. After visiting each other in Lisbon and New York, Lennox decided to move to Europe because he also felt "connected to the European way of life", considering himself as a "slow moving kind of person" and Lisbon as a "slow moving kind of place". In 2004, Lennox moved from New York City to Lisbon, Portugal. He first visited the city for a vacation following a long Animal Collective tour in 2003. Lennox says about Lisbon: "Since I got off the airplane here [for the first time] I had a good feeling about this place." Lennox and Pereira have a daughter born in 2005, and a son born in June 2010. In 2007, he and Pereira collaborated on a line of sweatshirts called 2nd Things. Pereira also directed music videos for his songs "Playing the Long Game" and "Danger". In 2023, the couple divorced. Lennox wrote songs about his experience of divorce to channel his grief, which were released as the album Sinister Grift in 2025.

In 2023, Lennox was in a relationship with Rivka Ravede from the band the Spirit of the Beehive, who toured with Animal Collective in 2022. On July 31, 2026, Rivka announced on Instagram that the two were married in Istanbul.

== Musical equipment ==
Synthesizers

- Minimoog Voyager
- Korg M3

Digital samplers

- Roland SP-555
- Boss SP-303 "Dr. Sample"
- Teenage Engineering OP-1

Drum machine/synthesizer

- JoMoX Xbase 999

== Discography ==
Panda Bear discography
- Studio albums: 7
- Extended plays: 3
- Singles: 20
- Collaborative albums: 5

=== Solo ===
==== Studio albums ====
Title	Album details	Peak chart positions		
Title	Album details	US	US Indie	UK
Panda Bear	Released: 1999; Label: Soccer Star	—	—	—
Young Prayer	Released: September 28, 2004; Label: Paw Tracks	—	—	—
Person Pitch	Released: March 20, 2007; Label: Paw Tracks	—	38	—
Tomboy	Released: April 12, 2011; Label: Paw Tracks	29	5	62
Panda Bear Meets the Grim Reaper	Released: January 9, 2015; Label: Domino	34	2	49
Buoys	Released: February 8, 2019; Label: Domino	—	7	—
Sinister Grift	Released: February 28, 2025; Label: Domino	—	—	—
"—" denotes album that did not chart or was not released

==== Extended plays ====
Title	Album details
Mr Noah	Released: October 23, 2014; Label: Domino
Crosswords	Released: August 20, 2015; Label: Domino
A Day with the Homies	Released: January 12, 2018; Label: Domino

==== Singles ====
- "I'm Not / Comfy in Nautica" (September 22, 2005, UUAR)
- "Bros" (December 4, 2006, Fat Cat Records)
- "Carrots" (split 7-inch with Excepter) (January 23, 2007, Paw Tracks)
- "Take Pills" (June 19, 2007, Paw Tracks)
- "Tomboy" (July 13, 2010, Paw Tracks)
- "You Can Count on Me" (October 19, 2010, Domino)
- "Last Night at the Jetty" (December 13, 2010, FatCat Records)
- "Surfer's Hymn" (March 28, 2011, Kompakt)
- "Mr Noah" (October 23, 2014, Domino)
- "Boys Latin" (December 15, 2014, Domino)
- "Dolphin" (November 8, 2018, Domino)
- "Token" (January 14, 2019, Domino)
- "Playing the Long Game" (October 9, 2019, Domino)
- "Defense" (feat. Cindy Lee) (October 15, 2024, Domino)
- "Ferry Lady" (January 5, 2025, Domino)
- "Ends Meet" (February 6, 2025, Domino)
- "Venom's In" (feat. Cass McCombs) (December 16, 2025, Domino)

==== Remixes ====
- The Notwist - "Boneless (Panda Bear Remix)" (2008)
- Korallreven - "As Young as Yesterday (Panda Bear Remix)" (2011)
- Interpol - "All the Rage Back Home (Panda Bear Remix)" (2015)
- Eric Copeland - "Cheap Treat (Panda Bear Version)" (2015)
- Avey Tare - "Melody Unfair (Panda Bear Remix)" (2018)
- Remi Wolf - "Woo! (Panda Bear Remix)" (2021)
- Angel Du$t - "Never Ending Game (Panda Bear Remix)" (2021)
- Paramore - "Running Out of Time (Re: Panda Bear)" (2023)
- David Holmes - "Yeah x 3 (Sonic Boom & Panda Bear Reset Remix)" (2024)
- Kassie Krut - "Hooh Beat (Panda Bear Remix)" (2025)
- Turnstile - "Magic Man (Panda Bear Version)" (2026)
- Grace Ives - "Stupid Bitches (Panda Bear Version)" (2026)

==== As featured artist ====
- Taken by Trees - "Anna" (September 7, 2009)
- Atlas Sound - "Walkabout" (October 20, 2009)
- Pantha du Prince - "Stick to My Side" (February 9, 2010)
- Ducktails - "Killin the Vibe" (January 18, 2011)
- Zomby - "Things Fall Apart" (July 11, 2011)
- Teengirl Fantasy - "Pyjama" (August 21, 2012)
- Daft Punk - "Doin' It Right" (May 17, 2013)
- Solange - "Time (Is)", "Binz", "Beltway", "I'm a Witness" (March 1, 2019)
- Paul Maroon - "I Don't Need a Crowd" (March 15, 2019)
- Teebs - "Studie" (September 18, 2019)
- Sporting Life - "Gameday Continues" (January 27, 2020)
- Dean Blunt - "2", "9" (March 27, 2020)
- Sonic Boom - "Just a Little Piece of Me" (June 5, 2020)
- Maral - "On Your Way" (July 6, 2021)
- Braxe + Falcon - "Step by Step" (March 29, 2022)
- George Fitzgerald - "Passed Tense" (September 2, 2022)
- Teebs - "Did It Again" (September 26, 2022)
- Nosaj Thing - "All Over" (October 28, 2022)
- Lifted - "Best" (November 4, 2022)
- Império Pacífico - "Aftershow" (December 27, 2022)
- Flume - "One Step Closer 1.4" (February 8, 2023)
- Rusty Santos - "Mirror" (June 1, 2023)
- Avey Tare - "Vampire Tongues" (June 13, 2024)
- Bullion - "A City's Never" (April 26, 2024)
- Dean Blunt and Vegyn - "DOWNER" (May 23, 2024)
- Jamie xx - "Dafodil" (Aug, 29 2024)
- The Crying Nudes - "greaser (panda bear version)" (October 9, 2025)
- Heems - "Star-Crossed" (October 31, 2025)
- The Avalanches - "Highfield" (October 16, 2026)

=== with Avey Tare ===
- Spirit They're Gone, Spirit They've Vanished (2000)

=== with Avey Tare and Geologist ===
- Danse Manatee (2001)

=== with Campfire Songs ===
- Campfire Songs (2003)

=== with Animal Collective ===
- Here Comes the Indian (2003)
- Sung Tongs (2004)
- Feels (2005)
- Strawberry Jam (2007)
- Merriweather Post Pavilion (2009)
- Centipede Hz (2012)
- Painting With (2016)
- Time Skiffs (2022)
- Isn't It Now? (2023)

=== with Sonic Boom ===
==== Studio albums ====
- Reset (2022)
- A ? of When (2026)

==== EPs ====
- Reset Mariachi EP (with Mariachi 2000 de Cutberto Pérez) (2024)

==== Singles ====
- "Go On" (July 13, 2022, Domino)
- "Edge of the Edge" (August 3, 2022, Domino)
- "Whirlpool Dub (Adrian Sherwood ‘Reset in Dub’ Version)" (July 13, 2023, Domino)
- "Graveyard" / "Lucky Charm" (April 18, 2026, Domino)

==== Remix albums ====
- Reset in Dub (with Adrian Sherwood) (2023)
