= Avey Tare =

American musician (born 1979)

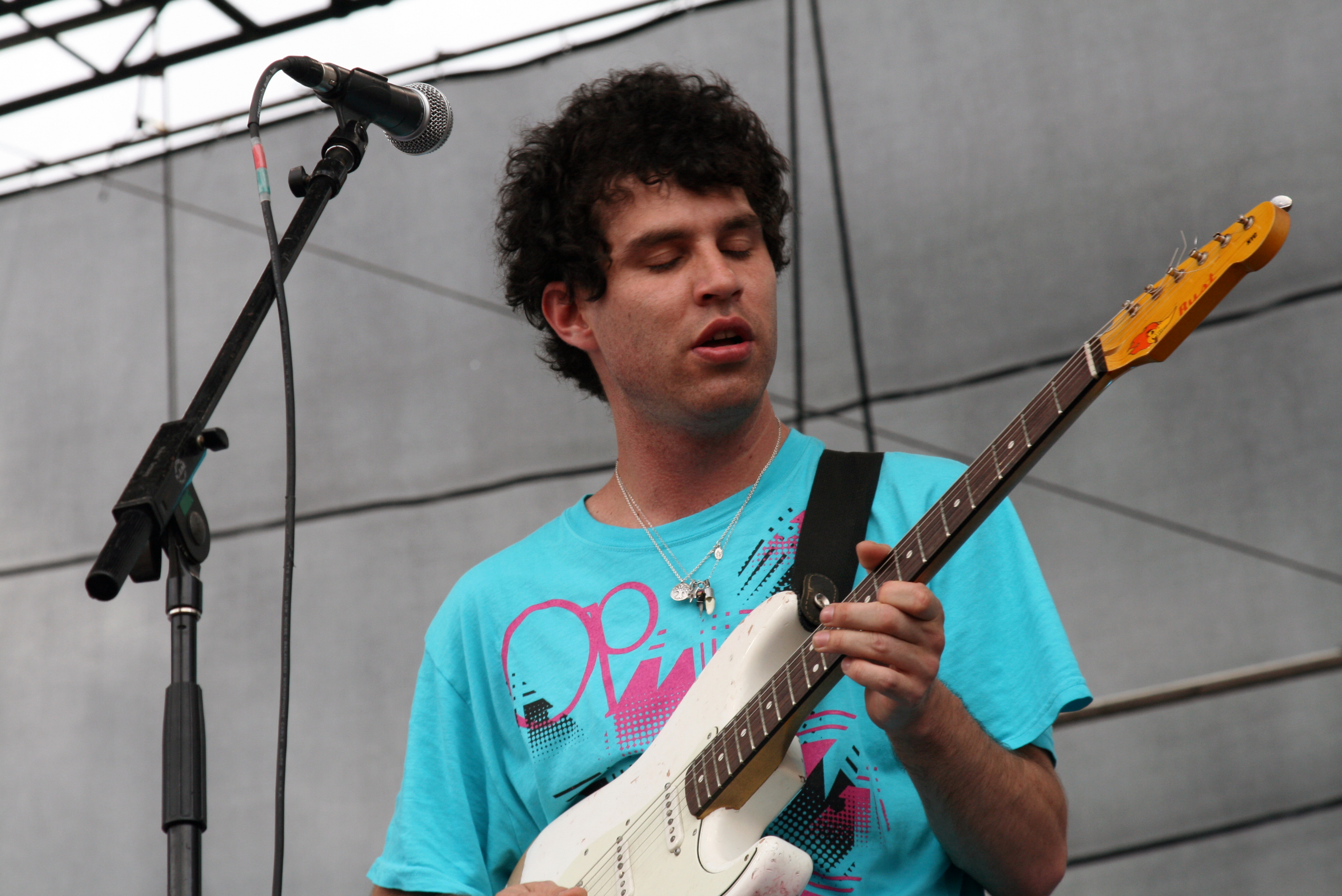
- Portner performing with Animal Collective, 2009

Background information
- Born: David Michael Portner; April 24, 1979 (age 47); Baltimore, Maryland, U.S.
- Years active: 1995–present
- Labels: Paw Tracks, FatCat Records, Domino Recording Company, Mistletone, Catsup Plate, St. Ives, UAAR,
- Website: aveytare.com

David Michael Portner (born April 24, 1979), also known by his moniker Avey Tare, is an American musician and songwriter who co-founded the experimental pop band Animal Collective. He has released four solo albums, as well as four collaborative albums with Panda Bear (Noah Lennox) three of which were later retroactively classified under Animal Collective's discography.

== Animal Collective ==
Portner met Animal Collective's Deakin (Josh Dibb), Panda Bear (Noah Lennox), and Geologist (Brian Weitz) in high school. For years, the four of them swapped homemade recordings, shared musical ideas and performed in different group configurations. Portner recorded the Spirit They're Gone, Spirit They've Vanished album with Lennox, and initially released the recording on the band's own Animal label in 1999. The album is commonly referred to as the first official Animal Collective release, with Portner writing the music and Lennox providing the 'perfect percussion' (as cited in the album's credits).

After high school, Portner and Weitz moved to New York City to attend New York University and Columbia University, respectively. Lennox and Dibb eventually moved to New York City, and the band became more collaborative in nature. They finally settled on the name "Animal Collective".

The alias "Avey Tare" comes from "tearing" apart the name "Davey".

Although the band's output is, as their name suggests, a collaborative effort, with no typical 'frontman,' Portner has been cited by the other members as being the 'primary songwriter' and de facto leader of the group. For the band's Centipede Hz, Portner confirmed that the album has eight songs penned by him.

== Other musical projects ==
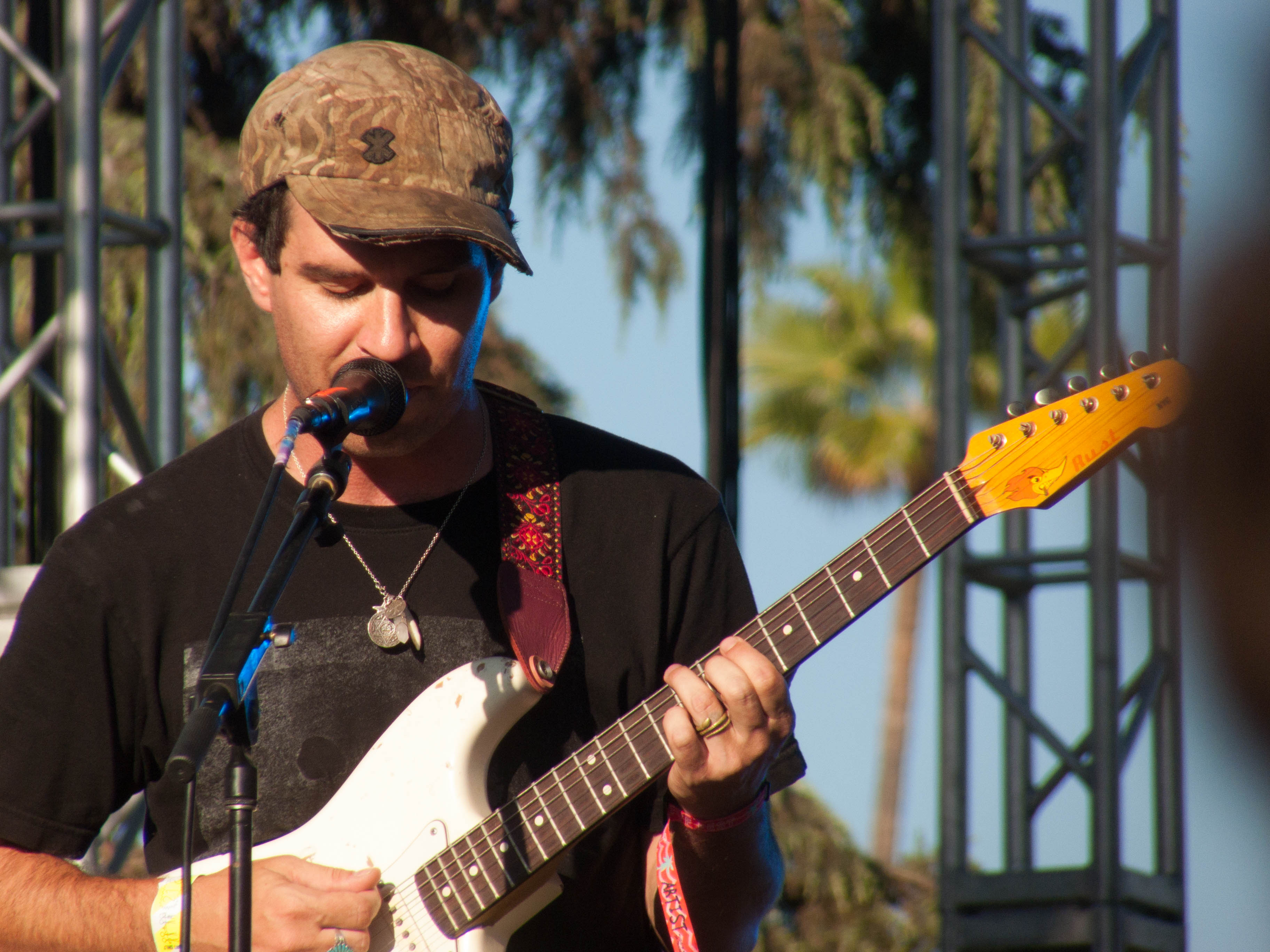
Live with Avey Tare's Slasher Flicks at FYF Fest, 2014

Portner's other projects and releases include Terrestrial Tones with Eric Copeland of Black Dice, a split 12" with David Grubbs, and Pullhair Rubeye, an LP made with his then-wife Kristín Anna Valtýsdóttir, former member of Icelandic band múm. He released his debut solo album, Down There, on October 26, 2010.

In April, 2013, it was announced that Portner had formed the group Avey Tare's Slasher Flicks with Angel Deradoorian, former member of Dirty Projectors, and ex-Ponytail drummer Jeremy Hyman. Portner describes the band as "[a] group of three hippies on a road trip through the backwaters of 2013s rural music scene fall prey to a murderous cannibalistic band making..." Their debut album, Enter the Slasher House, came out internationally on April 7, 2014, and a supporting West Coast tour was announced soon after the album's release. Ahead of the album, they released a video for "Little Fang", directed by Portner's sister and featuring a puppet created by Jim Henson's Creature Shop. In 2017, he appeared on Grateful Dead member Mickey Hart's solo album, RAMU.

== Personal life ==
David's sister is Abby Portner, Los Angeles artist and experimental musician, who creates some of Animal Collective's artwork and stage design.

From 2006 to 2008, Portner was married to Icelandic musician Kristín Anna Valtýsdóttir, also known as Kría Brekkan. Afterwards, he was in a relationship with musician Angel Deradoorian and moved to Los Angeles with her. He currently lives in North Carolina and is in a relationship.

== Discography ==
=== Studio albums ===
| Title | Album details |
|---|---|
| Spirit They're Gone, Spirit They've Vanished (with Panda Bear) | Released: August 2000; Label: Animal, FatCat; Formats: CD, LP |
| Danse Manatee (with Panda Bear and Geologist) | Released: July 2001; Label: Catsup Plate, FatCat; Formats: CD, LP |
| Pullhair Rubeye (with Kria Brekkan) | Released: 2007; Label: Paw Tracks |
| Down There | Released: October 25, 2010; Label: Paw Tracks |
| Enter the Slasher House (Avey Tare's Slasher Flicks) | Released: April 7, 2014; Label: Domino |
| Eucalyptus | Released: July 21, 2017; Label: Domino |
| Cows on Hourglass Pond | Released: March 22, 2019; Label: Domino |
| 7s | Released: February 17, 2023; Label: Domino |

=== EPs ===
- Split Series #16 (2003, Fat Cat Records) (split 12" with David Grubbs)
- New Psycho Actives, Vol. 1 (2015, self released) (with Geologist)
- Essence of Eucalyptus (2018, Domino)
- K.C. Yours (2019, Domino)
- Conference of Birds / Birds in Disguise (2019, Domino)
- Fast Lea / Amphora (2024, DOSed) (split cassette with Superflower)

=== Singles ===
- "Lucky 1" (October 2010, Paw Tracks)
- "Tipped in Hugs / Dog Says Goodbye" (March 2019, Domino)
- "Wake My Door" (April 2020, Domino)
- "Pandemic Dream #4" (February 2021, Domino)
- "Vampire Tongues" feat. Panda Bear (June 2024, Domino)
- "The Musical / Hey Bog" (January 2023, Domino)
- "Invincible Darlings" (February 2023, Domino)

=== Appearances ===
- "Judy Biworker" on the sampler Esopus CD #4: Imaginary Friends (Spring 2005)
- "I'm Your Eagle Kisser" on the compilation Living Bridge (February 26, 2008, Rare Book Room Records)
- "Call Home (Buy Grapes)" on the cassette tape Keep + Animal Collective (March 2011, Keep)

=== Collaborations ===
With Croz Boyce (Avey Tare and Geologist)

- Croz Boyce (May 2026, Domino)

With Ellicott Hooligan (Avey Tare and Sham)

- Ellicott Hooligan (March 2025, Tree of Heaven Recordings)
- Shining Other (October 2025, DOSed)

With Mickey Hart

- RAMU (2017)

With Terrestrial Tones (Avey Tare and Eric Copeland)

- Blasted (2005, Psych-o-Path Records)
- Oboroed/Circus Lives (2005, UUAR)
- Dead Drunk (2006, Paw Tracks)

With The Powers Ensemble

- Kindling (June 2026, Shiny Boy Press)

=== Remixes ===
- The Spirit of the Beehive - "It Might Take Some Time (Avey Tare Remix)" (2021)
- Winter - "Crimson Enclosure (Avey Tare Remix)" (2023)
- Sham - "Self Portrait in White (Avey Tare Remix)" (2024)
