= World Tour 2025 =

2025 concert tour by King Gizzard & the Lizard Wizard

In 2025, Australian rock band King Gizzard and the Lizard Wizard announced four separate tours in part to promote their new album Phantom Island, one in Europe, one in North America, a second 'techno' tour in Europe, and finally a tour in their native Australia. Besides their European Residency Tour, which took place prior to the release of Phantom Island, tours consisted of traditional rock-and-roll concerts (with the exception of the second European tour which consisted of raves) intermixed with 'orchestral' shows, playing their new album with various orchestras.

While each "leg" of this "world tour" were announced, and treated, as separate tours from one another by the band, they have also occasionally used World Tour 2025 when advertising them as a whole. Unlike World Tour 2024 which was branded as a world tour from the start, World Tour 2025 only was referred to as such well after the European Residency Tour ended.

== History ==
=== Europe Residency Tour ===
King Gizzard & the Lizard Wizard European Residency Tour
- Tour by King Gizzard & the Lizard Wizard
- Start date: 18 May 2025
- End date: 10 June 2025
- Legs: 1
- No. of shows: 15

King Gizzard & the Lizard Wizard concert chronology
- World Tour 2024 (2024); European Residency Tour (2025); Phantom Island Tour (2025)

The Europe Residency Tour was announced on June 10, 2024, shortly after the conclusion of their European leg of their World Tour 2024, with tickets starting to be sold on June 13. The announcement also came alongside the naming of their 26th album, Flight b741. The tour was designed to "mirror" their U.S. Residency Tour, with the posters being of a similar design.

The band's performances were live-streamed on YouTube and released as live albums on Bandcamp for free as part of their official bootlegger program. These include: Live in Lisbon '25, Live in Barcelona '25, Live in Lithuania '25, Live in Athens '25 , and Live in Bulgaria '25. In part to promote the live-streams, the band released a "Couch Tour" t-shirt featuring a design by Jason Galea of various members of the Gizzverse sitting on a couch.

During a rendition of "Self-Immolate" on the opening night in Lisbon, frontman Stu Mackenzie shaved his head with a pair of electric clippers. During their second night in Lithuania the band performed a cover of AC/DC's "Jailbreak" as the venue was an old prison. Additionally, on the third night, the band allowed a fan named Ignas to climb onto the stage with them and play Stu's guitar part during a performance of "Dragon" with Stu taking the time to crowd surf.

=== American Phantom Island Tour ===
Phantom Island Tour 2025
- Tour by King Gizzard & the Lizard Wizard
- Start date: 28 July 2025
- End date: 17 August 2025
- Legs: 1
- No. of shows: 11

King Gizzard & the Lizard Wizard concert chronology
- European Residency Tour (2025); Phantom Island Tour (2025); EU/UK 2025 (2025)

The tour was announced alongside the drop of the single "Phantom Island" on 29 October, 2024, to promote the then unnamed 27th Gizzard studio album. By April 9 it was revealed that the album was also named Phantom Island. The tour would consist of two types of shows, orchestral shows of Phantom Island with conductor Sarah Hicks alongside a different symphony orchestra in each city, and more classical Rock and Roll concerts capped off by a three day camping festival dubbed Field of Vision.

On the first show of the tour the band performed some songs after their performance of Phantom Island, including a rendition of Crumbling Castle with the outro which hadn't been played since 2018, and was the first time the song has ever been performed with its outro . The Band played in New Haven, Connecticut for the first time ever at the Westville Music Bowl, the former Connecticut Tennis Center. Shortly after the start of the tour the band would pull their library off of Spotify due to opposition to the investments of its CEO Daniel Ek into AI drone warfare. This announcement was coupled with the release of Demos Vol. 7 + Vol. 8.

During the first night of the Field of Vision the band would perform a cover of the Dead Kennedys' "Police Truck" with Jello Biafra, introducing him as "one of our heroes". Earlier that night during a rendition of "Oddlife" a fan, Matthew Gawiak, collapsed and despite the show stopping to allow his medical evacuation, he died en-route to a hospital. Chaffee County Sheriff Andy Rohrich announced that his death is being investigated as a potential homicide until proven otherwise due to procedure, but nobody has been arrested. Gawiak's family stated he complained of a headache before suddenly collapsing and died of "natural causes related to an undetected hereditary condition."

==== Setlist ====
Unlike the typical shows performed by the band, the Phantom Island Tour orchestral shows had a relatively static setlist that did not change from night to night due to the presence of the orchestra. The show was divided into two sets, the first consisting of Phantom Island performed in its entirety and the second consisting of several key tracks from the band's back catalogue reworked to include the orchestra, with a twenty-minute intermission jam between sets performed only by the band and varying from night to night. The intermission jam typically included a unique song every night, played while the orchestra had a break.

The setlist used on the Phantom Island Tour went unchanged for the band's performances in Europe and Australia later in the year.

Set 1 (Phantom Island)

1. "Phantom Island"
2. "Deadstick"
3. "Lonely Cosmos"
4. "Eternal Return"
5. "Panpsych"
6. "Spacesick"
7. "Aerodynamic"
8. "Sea of Doubt"
9. "Silent Spirit"
10. "Grow Wings and Fly"
11. Intermission jam (played without the orchestra, varied from night-to-night)

Set 2

1. "The River" (parts I, II, and IV)
2. "Crumbling Castle" (performed in full, with the outro)
3. "This Thing"
4. "Mars For the Rich"
5. "Dragon"
6. "Iron Lung"

=== EU/UK 2025 ===
King Gizzard & the Lizard Wizard EU/UK 2025
- Tour by King Gizzard & the Lizard Wizard
- Start date: 31 October 2025
- End date: 15 November 2025
- Legs: 1
- No. of shows: 13

King Gizzard & the Lizard Wizard concert chronology
- Phantom Island Tour (2025); EU/UK 2025 (2025); Phantom Island Australia Tour (2025)

The tour was announced on April 1, 2025, centering around content from their synth album The Silver Cord and their orchestral album Phantom Island. Tickets went on sale at 10am on April 4, London time. This was the band's second tour in Europe in 2025, as they had previously performed the Europe Residency Tour from May to June.

Due to the dual nature of their content for this tour, shows were divided into "rave" and "orchestral" sets, with British composer Chad Kelly (the original composer for the Phantom Island album) conducting and directing various orchestras during those sets. In a May 27 interview, band member Ambrose Kenny-Smith confirmed that the album after Phantom Island would be another synth album centered around eurorack although it was still unclear if it would be released before the tour.

=== Australian Phantom Island Tour ===
Phantom Island Australia Tour
- Tour by King Gizzard & the Lizard Wizard
- Start date: 2 December 2025
- End date: 13 December 2025
- Legs: 1
- No. of shows: 7

King Gizzard & the Lizard Wizard concert chronology
- EU/UK 2025 (2025); Phantom Island Australia Tour (2025)

Announced on May 20, 2025, the Australian Phantom Island Tour was the first tour by the band in their native Australia in over two years. The shows consisted of orchestral sets including Phantom Island played in full with a different orchestra in each city, alongside traditional rock and roll sets. Party Dozen was announced as their openers in Brisbane and Sydney, while Barkaa will join them in Melbourne. Tickets went on sale at 10am AEST on May 23.

The band would announce a surprise show on October 24, 2025 in Fed Square, Melbourne, before they departed for their European tour. Opened by Mervin from Altin Gün, fans only had five days notice while the show itself was free. Several songs from Butterfly 3000 saw their first live debut, including "2.02 Killer Year", "Blue Morpho" and "Butterfly 3000" while an entirely new song "JOJAM" was unveiled.

== List of concerts ==
European Residency Tour
Date	City	Country	Venue
May 18, 2025	Lisbon	Portugal	Coliseu dos Recreios
May 19, 2025	Lisbon	Portugal	Coliseu dos Recreios
May 20, 2025	Lisbon	Portugal	Coliseu dos Recreios
May 23, 2025	Barcelona	Spain	Poble Espanyol
May 24, 2025	Barcelona	Spain	Poble Espanyol
May 25, 2025	Barcelona	Spain	Poble Espanyol
May 29, 2025	Vilnius	Lithuania	Lukiškės Prison
May 30, 2025	Vilnius	Lithuania	Lukiškės Prison
May 31, 2025	Vilnius	Lithuania	Lukiškės Prison
June 4, 2025	Athens	Greece	Lycabettus Theatre
June 5, 2025	Athens	Greece	Lycabettus Theatre
June 6, 2025	Athens	Greece	Lycabettus Theatre
June 8, 2025	Plovdiv	Bulgaria	Ancient Theatre
June 9, 2025	Plovdiv	Bulgaria	Ancient Theatre
June 10, 2025	Plovdiv	Bulgaria	Ancient Theatre

Phantom Island Tour (North America)
Date	City	State	Venue	Type
July 28, 2025	Philadelphia	Pennsylvania	TD Pavilion at the Mann	Orchestra
July 30, 2025	New Haven	Connecticut	Westville Music Bowl	Orchestra
August 1, 2025	New York	New York	Forest Hills Stadium	Orchestra
August 2, 2025	New York	New York	Forest Hills Stadium	Rock N'Roll
August 4, 2025	Columbia	Maryland	Merriweather Post Pavilion	Orchestra
August 6, 2025	Highland Park	Illinois	Ravinia Festival	Orchestra
August 8, 2025	Colorado Springs	Colorado	Ford Amphitheater	Orchestra
August 10, 2025	Los Angeles	California	Hollywood Bowl	Orchestra
August 11, 2025	San Diego	California	The Rady Shell at Jacobs Park	Orchestra
August 15, 2025	Buena Vista	Colorado	Field of Vision (Note: A three-day music festival hosted and run by KGLW)	Rock N'Roll
August 16, 2025	Buena Vista	Colorado	Field of Vision	Rock N'Roll
August 17, 2025	Buena Vista	Colorado	Field of Vision	Rock N'Roll

EU/UK 2025
Date	City	Country	Venue	Type
October 31, 2025	Manchester	United Kingdom	Aviva Studios	Rave
November 1, 2025	London	United Kingdom	Electric Brixton	Rave
November 2, 2025	London	United Kingdom	Electric Brixton	Rave
November 4, 2025	London	United Kingdom	Royal Albert Hall	Orchestra
November 5, 2025	Paris	France	La Seine Musicale	Orchestra
November 6, 2025	Tilburg	Netherlands	013	Rave
November 7, 2025	Den Bosch	Netherlands	MAINSTAGE	Orchestra
November 9, 2025	Gdańsk	Poland	Inside Seaside Festival	Orchestra
November 10, 2025	Berlin	Germany	Columbiahalle	Rave
November 11, 2025	Prague	Czech Republic	SaSaZu	Rave
November 12, 2025	Vienna	Austria	Gasometer	Rave
November 14, 2025	Copenhagen	Denmark	Poolen	Rave
November 15, 2025	Gothenburg	Sweden	Gothenburg Film Studios	Rave

Phantom Island Tour (Australia)
Date	City	State	Venue	Type
October 24, 2025 (Note: A free performance announced 5 days beforehand, not technically part of the Australian tour, but as a precursor to EU/UK 2025)	Melbourne	Victoria	Fed Square	Rave
December 2, 2025	Sydney	New South Wales	Sydney Opera House	Orchestra
December 3, 2025	Sydney	New South Wales	Sydney Opera House	Orchestra
December 5, 2025	Sydney	New South Wales	Enmore Theatre	Rock
December 7, 2025	Brisbane	Queensland	Fortitude Music Hall	Rock
December 9, 2025	Brisbane	Queensland	Princess Theatre	Orchestra
December 12, 2025,	Melbourne	Victoria	Sidney Myer Music Bowl	Orchestra
December 13, 2025	Melbourne	Victoria	Sidney Myer Music Bowl	Rock
