= Dead Slow =

Studio album by Heavy Moss
- Released: November 22, 2024
- Recorded: 2022–2024
- Genre: Psych-pop
- Length: 43:06
- Label: P(doom) Records

Singles from Dead Slow
- 1. "Star" Released: October 2, 2024; 2. "Treadmills" Released: November 13, 2024

Dead Slow is the debut studio album by Australian psych-pop band Heavy Moss, released on November 22, 2024.

== Development ==
Heavy Moss' debut album, the band was formed in late 2022 after Lucas Harwood and Sam Ingles reconnected in their hometown of Geelong. Both had previously played in a Surf rock band named Atolls from 2011 to 2014. Most of the band's music is from a back catalog of unused song ideas made by Harwood which didn't mesh with the style of the other band he was in, King Gizzard and the Lizard Wizard. While Harwood and Ingles work-shopped these old songs, they also brought in Kyle Tickell, a dreampop veteran, and Bec Goring with a background in jazz, to complete the band's lineup. In the buildup to the album's release, two songs, Star and Treadmills, would be released as singles.

The songs were written by Lucas Harwood and Kyle Tickell, with Tickell making more "jangly pop" songs, while Harwood took influence from the 1960s. Tickell claims that he came up with the melody for "Star" while rushing back to his friend's house in Berlin where he had left his wallet and that "it was just beamed down to me." Tickell's songs included nods to the Flaming Lips, while Harwood's influences were "in the spirit of" Elephant 6. Sam Ingles wrote the song "Melt" as a nod to early psych pop from The Black Angels and Dead Meadow.

Harwood had the album recorded in the headquarters of King Gizzard and the Lizard Wizard, and stated that his band-mate Stu Mackenzie "really gave me confidence to make some drastic sonic decisions" and that Stu "helped find that flow socially throughout the whole song." Harwood and Mackenzie would mix half the album while on the World Tour 2024. The album would be released under the P(doom) Records label.

== Reception ==
The Fire Note described the album as "shimmering melodies with an earthy, rhythmic backbone... contributing to an overall chill and warm, swaying vibe", comparing the music to Galaxie 500, Spacemen 3, My Morning Jacket, and Strand of Oaks.

The Fire Note claimed the songs "Star", "Treadmills", and "Blutac" were the strongest, showcasing the range of the band from "Star" showcasing their originality, "Treadmills" delivering a "King Gizzard-inspired psych vibe", and "Blutac" being more rock-heavy.

== Track listing ==
Dead Slow track listing
No.	Title	Writer(s)	Lead vocals	Length
1.	"Le con"	Kyle Tickell	Tickell	6:17
2.	"Distant Boy"	Tickell, Lucas Harwood, Ambrose Kenny-Smith	Tickell and Harwood	4:40
3.	"Jump"	Tickell, Harwood, Stu Mackenzie	Harwood and Tickell	3:50
4.	"Star"	Tickell	Tickell with Bec Goring	5:32
5.	"Blutac"	Tickell	Tickell	5:35
6.	"Treadmills"	Harwood	Harwood	6:06
7.	"Melt"	Sam Ingles	Ingles	5:29
8.	"Cold"	Tickell	Tickell	5:40

== Personnel ==
Heavy Moss

- Lucas Harwood — keyboards (all tracks), vocals (1–3, 5–7), guitar (1, 3)
- Kyle Tickell — guitar, vocals (all tracks), synthesizer (1), keyboards (5)
- Bec Goring — bass guitar (all tracks), vocals (1, 4–7), guitar (1, 6)
- Sam Ingles — drums, percussion (all tracks), vocals (1, 7), synthesizer (1), keyboards (7, 8)

Production

- Heavy Moss — production, recording
- Stu Mackenzie — mixing (1, 2, 4, 5)
- Michael Badger — mixing (3, 6–8)
- Joe Carra — mastering
- Sam Ingles — cover art, design, layout
- Sonny Witton — photography
