= Star (Heavy Moss song) =

Single by Heavy Moss

from the album Dead Slow
- Released: October 2, 2024
- Genre: psych-pop
- Length: 5:32

Heavy Moss singles chronology
"Summa" (2023)	"Star" (2024)	"Treadmills" (2024)

Music video
- "Star" on YouTube

"Star" is the third single by Australian psych-pop band Heavy Moss, later released as part of their first studio album, Dead Slow.

== Recording ==
"Star" was the first song from Dead Slow, released on October 2, 2024, prior to the album's release on November 22. The melody for the song was created by Kyle Tickell, who claims that he came up with it when he was rushing back to his friends house in Berlin after leaving his wallet there. The song's music video was also directed by Tikell, which depicts the band branding a patch of earth in the shape of a star to contact aliens.

== Reception ==
The song has been described as a "mellow groove" largely driven by Rhodes piano that is reminiscent of bands like Real Estate and My Morning Jacket.

== Personnel ==
Adapted from the band's bandcamp page.

- Kyle Tickell – guitar, vocals
- Sam Ingles – drums, percussion
- Bec Goring – bass, vocals
- Lucas Harwood – keys
