= Phantom Island (album) =

Studio album by King Gizzard & the Lizard Wizard
- Released: 13 June 2025
- Genres: Orchestral rock; roots rock
- Length: 46:39
- Label: p(doom)
- Producer: Stu Mackenzie

King Gizzard & the Lizard Wizard chronology
Flight b741 (2024)	Phantom Island (2025)	Demos Vol. 7 + Vol. 8 (2025)

Singles from Phantom Island
- 1. "Phantom Island" Released: 29 October 2024; 2. "Deadstick" Released: 15 April 2025; 3. "Grow Wings and Fly" Released: 13 May 2025

Phantom Island is the twenty-seventh studio album by Australian psychedelic rock band King Gizzard & the Lizard Wizard, released on 13 June 2025, through p(doom) Records. Recorded concurrently with their prior album, Flight b741 (2024), Phantom Island continues on the same themes, with a more orchestral sound.

== Background ==
During a break between legs of their World Tour 2024 on 29 October 2024, KGLW would release a single titled "Phantom Island" as part of a then-unnamed 27th album which they would be performing live alongside various orchestras during an upcoming tour in 2025. Stu Mackenzie and Ambrose Kenny-Smith explained that the album was developed alongside Flight b741 but that Flight b741 contained the more "rowdy" songs while the new album will be "more laidback." Stu Mackenzie stated that they were inspired to do an orchestral album after performing at the Hollywood Bowl in 2023 on the band's U.S. Residency Tour where they met with the Los Angeles Philharmonic orchestra backstage.

Mackenzie also stated:

"The songs felt like they needed this other energy and colour, that we needed to splash some different paint on the canvas. We didn’t know we were going to have an orchestra dubbed on top when we were recording. If we had, that would have really changed the songs. But we went into it very free and easy. The songs were written in a very 'improv' way, stitched together from multiple takes or longer jams… It feels like you’re in the room with the band and the orchestra, that we’re all in the same room together.

On 9 April 2025, the band announced the album's title as Phantom Island along with its tracklist. On 15 April, alongside pre-orders going live, a second single "Deadstick" was released with a music video. Additionally the band announced that the album would be released on 13 June as well as more information as to why English composer Chad Kelly was brought onto the project, with Mackenzie saying:

He brings this wealth of musical awareness to his chameleon-like arrangements. We come from such different worlds — he plays Mozart and Bach and uses the same harpsichords they did, and tunes them the exact same way. But he’s obsessed with microtonal music, too, and all this nerdy stuff like me.

On 13 May the band released the third single from the album "Grow Wings and Fly" alongside its music video. On 3 June the band released the Making of Phantom Island behind the scenes documentary on the album with the album itself released on 13 June.

== Reception ==
Professional ratings
Aggregate scores
Source	Rating
Metacritic	74/100
Review scores
Source	Rating

On June 10 Exclaim! published their review of the album before it dropped, calling it "their most vulnerable, intimate record" and thematically "oddly akin to '60s trucker country." They described Phantom Island as "'70s soft rock", "Sea of Doubt" as Southern rock, "Silent Spirit" as a jazzy crooner, and "Deadstick" as "freaky, bluesy." Overall Exclaim! called 'Phantom Island' a "timely pause in an otherwise full-throttle discography."

== Live performances ==
The track "Grow Wings and Fly" was played twice during their 2024 World Tour before the song had been confirmed as part of the album, once on 15 November at the Germania Insurance Amphitheater in Austin, Texas, and a second time on 17 November at the Mardi Gras World in New Orleans. Both times it was played following "Shanghai" from Butterfly 3000, where it spawned from jams as far back as 2023. The song "Aerodynamic" was also played at the band's Field of Vision festival held in August 2025.

King Gizzard & the Lizard Wizard announced a 2025 tour where they travelled the United States playing the album with a different orchestra in each city, with conductor Sarah Hicks. The orchestral shows were billed alongside a more standard Rock'N'Roll show at Forest Hills Stadium, with the tour capped off by a camping residency dubbed Field of Vision in Buena Vista, Colorado. During the orchestral shows, the band and orchestra played Phantom Island in full, followed by a 20-minute intermission jam by the band, and then a number of other tracks from the band's extensive discography once again including the orchestra.

In November, the Phantom Island Tour was brought to Europe, with orchestral shows held at four venues in the UK, France, the Netherlands and Poland interspersed with rave shows playing the band's electronic material. For the European shows, the band were joined on stage by Chad Kelly, the composer for the album. The orchestral tour concluded in December, with the band again joined by Kelly in playing five Phantom Island shows in their home country of Australia, including two performances at the Sydney Opera House, alongside several other Rock'N Roll shows.

== Track listing ==
All tracks are written by Michael Cavanagh, Cook Craig, Lucas Harwood, Ambrose Kenny-Smith, Stu Mackenzie, and Joey Walker, except where noted (as per APRA AMCOS).

Phantom Island track listing
No.	Title	Writer(s)	Length
1.	"Phantom Island"		5:16
2.	"Deadstick"		3:34
3.	"Lonely Cosmos"	Cavanagh; Craig; Kenny-Smith; Mackenzie; Walker	5:35
4.	"Eternal Return"		4:34
5.	"Panpsych"		4:02
6.	"Spacesick"		4:51
7.	"Aerodynamic"		4:47
8.	"Sea of Doubt"		4:25
9.	"Silent Spirit"		4:29
10.	"Grow Wings and Fly"		5:08
Total length:			46:39

== Personnel ==
Credits are adapted from the album's liner notes.

King Gizzard & the Lizard Wizard

- Ambrose Kenny-Smith – vocals; piano (tracks 1, 2, 4–6, 9, 10)
- Michael Cavanagh – drums, percussion
- Cook Craig – bass guitar (tracks 1, 3, 8, 10), Mellotron (tracks 1, 6), organ (tracks 2, 4, 9), vocals (tracks 1, 3, 4, 8, 10)
- Joey Walker – guitar; bass guitar (tracks 1, 4, 5), vocals (tracks 2, 4–7, 9, 10)
- Lucas Harwood – bass guitar (tracks 1, 2, 4–7, 9, 10), piano (track 4), vocals (tracks 4, 5)
- Stu Mackenzie – guitar, vocals; bass guitar (tracks 1, 3–8), Mellotron (tracks 1–3, 5, 6), organ, piano (track 1)

Additional musicians

- Sam Joseph – pedal steel (tracks 5, 8, 10)
- Chad Kelly – orchestral arrangements, piano
- Brett Kelly – conductor
- Tim Wilson – saxophone
- Lachlan Davidson – saxophone, flute
- Phil Noy – saxophone
- Patrick McMullin – trumpet
- Daniel Beasy – trumpet
- Shane Hooton – trumpet
- Chris Vizard – trombone
- James Bowman – trombone
- Joe O’Callaghan – trombone
- Abbey Edlin – French horn
- Wendy Clarke – flute
- Natasha Fearnside – clarinet
- Matthew Kneale – bassoon
- Madeleine Jevons – violin (concert master)
- Jos Jonker – violin
- Miranda Matheson – violin
- Ruby Paskas – violin
- Josephine Chung – violin
- Merewyn Bramble – viola
- Karen Columbine – viola
- Gemma Kneale – cello
- Paul Zabrowarny – cello

Technical

- Sam Joseph – initial band recordings
- Lachlan Carrick, Ross Cockle – orchestral recording
- King Gizzard & the Lizard Wizard – overdubs
- Stu Mackenzie – mixing, producer
- Joe Carra – mastering
- Jason Galea – artwork
- Maclay Heriot – photography
- Roscoe Irwin – orchestral contractor, musical consultant
- Cameron Jamieson – orchestral contractor

== Charts ==
Weekly chart performance for Phantom Island
Chart (2025)	Peak position
Australian Albums (ARIA)	5
Belgian Albums (Ultratop Flanders)	188
French Rock & Metal Albums (SNEP)	18
Scottish Albums (Official Charts)	34
UK Albums Sales (OCC)	33
UK Independent Albums (Official Charts)	11
UK Progressive Albums (Official Charts)	3
US Billboard 200	85

Year-end chart performance for Phantom Island
Chart (2025)	Position
Australian Artist Albums (ARIA)	30
