= Ready for Heaven =

Studio album by Deradoorian
- Released: May 9, 2025
- Genre: Pop
- Length: 39:47
- Label: Fire Records
- Producer: Angel Deradoorian; Sonny DiPerri

Deradoorian chronology
Find the Sun (2020)	Ready for Heaven (2025)

Singles from Ready for Heaven
- 1. "Digital Gravestone" Released: December 2024; 2. "Set Me Free" Released: February 26, 2025; 3. "Any Other World" Released: March 18, 2025; 4. "No No Yes Yes" Released: April 15, 2025

Ready for Heaven is the third studio album by American indie musician and former Dirty Projectors member Deradoorian. It was released on May 9, 2025, via Fire Records in LP, CD and digital formats.

== Background ==
The album was preceded by Deradoorian's 2020 solo release, Find the Sun, and her 2023 album as part of Decisive Pink, Ticket to Fame. It was produced by Deradoorian and Sonny DiPerri, and features contributions from Patrick Shiroishi and Dylan Fujioka.

"Set Me Free" was released as the second single on February 26, 2025, following the release of previous single "Digital Gravestone" in December 2024. It was followed by the third single "Any Other World" on March 18, 2025, and fourth single "No No Yes Yes" on April 15, 2025.

== Reception ==
Professional ratings
Review scores
Source	Rating
AllMusic	4/5 stars
Beats Per Minute	79%
Narc	4/5 stars
Spectrum Culture	65%

In a four-star review for AllMusic, Tim Sendra noted the album as "easily her best record to date; it brings all her talents together in one shimmering, emotionally charged, and musically impressive package."

Chase McMullen of Beats Per Minute referred to it as "arguably her most painstakingly personal statement to date," giving it a rating score of 79%. Spectrum Culture's Konstantin N. Rega commented, "All in all, Ready for Heaven shows maturity as well as innovation. Deradoorian takes what they do best and reworks this or that aspect," calling it "an album that is open to newcomers but still engaged with already converted fans."

Robert Nichols of Narc rated the album four and stated, "Although Ready for Heaven seems to have the energy and spontaneity of a band, it is in fact all the work of the remarkable Los Angeles-based Angel Deradoorian, who offers up some sonic salvation." Matthijs Linnemann of Oor stated, "A slightly more emphatic personal stamp would adorn Deradoorian, but there is plenty to enjoy Ready for Heaven."

== Track listing ==
Ready for Heaven track listing
No.	Title	Length
1.	"Storm in My Brain"	2:28
2.	"Any Other World"	5:13
3.	"No No Yes Yes"	4:36
4.	"Digital Gravestone"	4:30
5.	"Set Me Free"	4:19
6.	"Golden Teachers"	4:24
7.	"Purgatory of Consciousness"	3:45
8.	"Reigning Down"	4:42
9.	"Hell Island"	5:50
Total length:		39:47

== Personnel ==
Credits adapted from AllMusic.

- Andrew Maguire – drums, percussion
- Angel Deradoorian – arranger, bass, composer, engineer, guitar, piano, producer, synthesizer
- Christopher Fallon – voices
- Cole Berliner – guitar
- Colin Smith – photography
- Dave Cooley – mastering
- Deradoorian – primary artist
- Dylan Fujioka – drums
- Jonah Birns – design
- Patrick Shiroishi – saxophone
- Pedrum Siadatian – guitar
- Sonny DiPerri – engineer, mixing
- Steve Marion – bass, guitar
