= Dlya = FOR =

Для = FOR

Studio album by Kate NV
- Released: June 22, 2018
- Length: 37:23
- Label: RVNG Intl.

Kate NV chronology
Binasu (2016)	Для = FOR (2018)	Room for the Moon (2020)

Для = FOR (romanized to Dlya = FOR) is a 2018 studio album by Russian pop musician Kate NV.

== Reception ==
Professional ratings
Aggregate scores
Source	Rating
Metacritic	86 (five reviews)
Review scores
Source	Rating
Drowned in Sound	6/10
Pitchfork	8.1/10
PopMatters	7/10

Для = FOR received positive reviews from critics noted at review aggregator Metacritic. It has a weighted average score of 86 out of 100, based on five reviews. Writing for Drowned in Sound, Max Pilley rated this release a 6 out of 10, praising individual tracks as well as Kate NV's live show, but writing that on this album "she retreats into a netherworld of amorphous, electronic filler, ruling herself out not just from crossover success but from most discerning interest". Pitchfork's Kevin Lozano rated Для = FOR an 8.1 out of 10, calling the music "surreal, otherworldly, and playfully inscrutable", with an "almost a painterly way to how [Kate NV] organizes sound". Adriane Pontecorvo of PopMatters rated this album a 7 out of 10, writing "Kate NV paints with weighty droplets, globs of synthesizer notes that evoke vintage Sesame Street segments and dilapidated music boxes even as their minimalism gives them a purely modern quality" and "it takes a close and discerning listen to pull apart the ways in which для FOR shows Kate NV's genius, but the time spent to do so is worthwhile". In Resident Advisor, Paul Clarke characterizes this release as a "colourful world of marimbas, chimes and synths from an inventive Russian artist", writing that these "tracks bustle with so much life, and so many details, that they seem like animated vignettes".

== Track listing ==
All songs written by Kate Shilonosova, except lyrics on "Вас = YOU" adapted from a poem by Wassily Kandinsky.

1. "Ухо = EAR" – 4:49
2. "Два = TWO" – 1:37
3. "Дуб = OAK" – 4:00
4. "Как = HOW" – 4:27
5. "Вас = YOU" – 3:46
6. "Раз = ONE" – 2:50
7. "Жук = BUG" – 4:16
8. "Зря = SEE" – 4:59
9. "Пес = DOG" – 3:28
10. "Кто = WHO" – 3:11

Bonus track on Japanese edition

11. "Дуб = Oak" (食品まつり A.k.a Foodman Remix) – 3:16

== Personnel ==
- Kate NV – instrumentation, vocals
- Rachel Alina – mastering
- Yusuke Tatewaki – liner notes on the Japanese edition
- Will Work for Good – design

== See also ==
- List of 2018 albums
