= Treadmills (song) =

Single by Heavy Moss

from the album Dead Slow
- Released: November 13, 2024
- Genre: psych-pop
- Length: 6:06

Heavy Moss singles chronology
"Star" (2024)	"Treadmills" (2024)

Music video
- "Treadmills" on YouTube

"Treadmills" is the fourth single by Australian psych-pop band Heavy Moss, later released as part of their first studio album, Dead Slow.

== Recording ==
The single was released on November 13, 2024, in the buildup to the first studio album by Heavy Moss, Dead Slow, which was released on November 22. Lucas Harwood stated that the song started as "a demo I had kicking around for a few years that I totally forgot about." Harwood stated that he had his Jazz teacher James Bowers help him work on the chords, and get the verses and chorus to work together, and that "the verses are an anxious stream of consciousness and is kind of jolty and angular" while the chorus "is in a different key and is meant to be a really pretty love song within the song." He also stated that his son Ari coined the line “I noticed your life” and that he was largely inspired by the songwriting of David Berman. Much of the work on “Treadmills” was done in post-production as the band experimented with different chords and styles.

== Reception ==
The song has been described as a "jangly waltz" that moves through various motifs before incorporating psychedelic elements and as being reminiscent of The Flaming Lips. Flood Magazine described the song as a "muted psych odyssey" similar in style to King Gizzard and the Lizard Wizard, which Harwood is also a member of.

== Personnel ==
Adapted from the band's bandcamp page.

- Kyle Tickell – guitar, vocals
- Sam Ingles – drums, percussion
- Bec Goring – bass, guitar, vocals
- Lucas Harwood – keys, vocals
