= Eternal return (disambiguation) =

Eternal return is a philosophical concept.

Eternal return may also refer to:

- Eternal return (Eliade), an idea proposed by Mircea Eliade
- The Eternal Return (album), a 2009 album by Darkest Hour
- The Eternal Return (film), a 1943 French romantic drama film
- "Eternal Return", a 2014 song by Sunn O))) from Terrestrials
- Eternal Return (Sarah Blasko album), 2015
- Eternal Return (Windhand album), 2018
- Eternal Return (video game), 2020
- "Eternal Return", a 2025 song by King Gizzard & the Lizard Wizard from Phantom Island
- Eternal Return (film), a 2025 British-American film written and directed by Yaniv Raz

== See also ==
- Eternal Recurrence (disambiguation)
- The Eternal Return of Antonis Paraskevas, a 2013 Greek film
