= Mana Island =

Mana Island may refer to:

- Mana Island (Fiji), in the Mamanuca chain
- Mana Island (New Zealand), off the southwestern coast of the North Island of New Zealand
- Mana Island (band), a Russian rock band on Xuman Records

== See also ==
- Mana (disambiguation)
