= Eternal Recurrence =

Eternal Recurrence may refer to:

- Eternal recurrence, a concept that the universe and all existence is perpetually recurring

== Music ==
- The Eternal Recurrence, a 1999 musical composition by Gerald Barry

=== Albums and EPs ===
- Eternal Recurrence, a 2012 album by Sear Bliss
- Eternal Recurrence (EP), a 2017 EP by Deradoorian

=== Songs ===
- "Eternal Recurrence", a song by Hiroki Kikuta from the 1993 album Secret of Mana Original Soundtrack
- "Eternal Recurrence", a song by Miyuki Hashimoto from the 2010 album Espressivo
- "Eternal Recurrence", a song by Ride from the 2019 album This Is Not a Safe Place
- "Cambrian II: Eternal Recurrence", a song by The Ocean from the 2018 album Phanerozoic I: Palaeozoic

== Other uses ==
- Eternal Recurrence, a 2014 installation artwork by Jim Campbell
- Love: Eternal Recurrence and Post Surreal Configuration: Eternal Recurrence, 1936 and 1940 paintings by Lorser Feitelson
- Xak III: The Eternal Recurrence, a 1993 video game

== See also ==
- Eternal return (disambiguation)
