= Glintshake =

Russian rock band

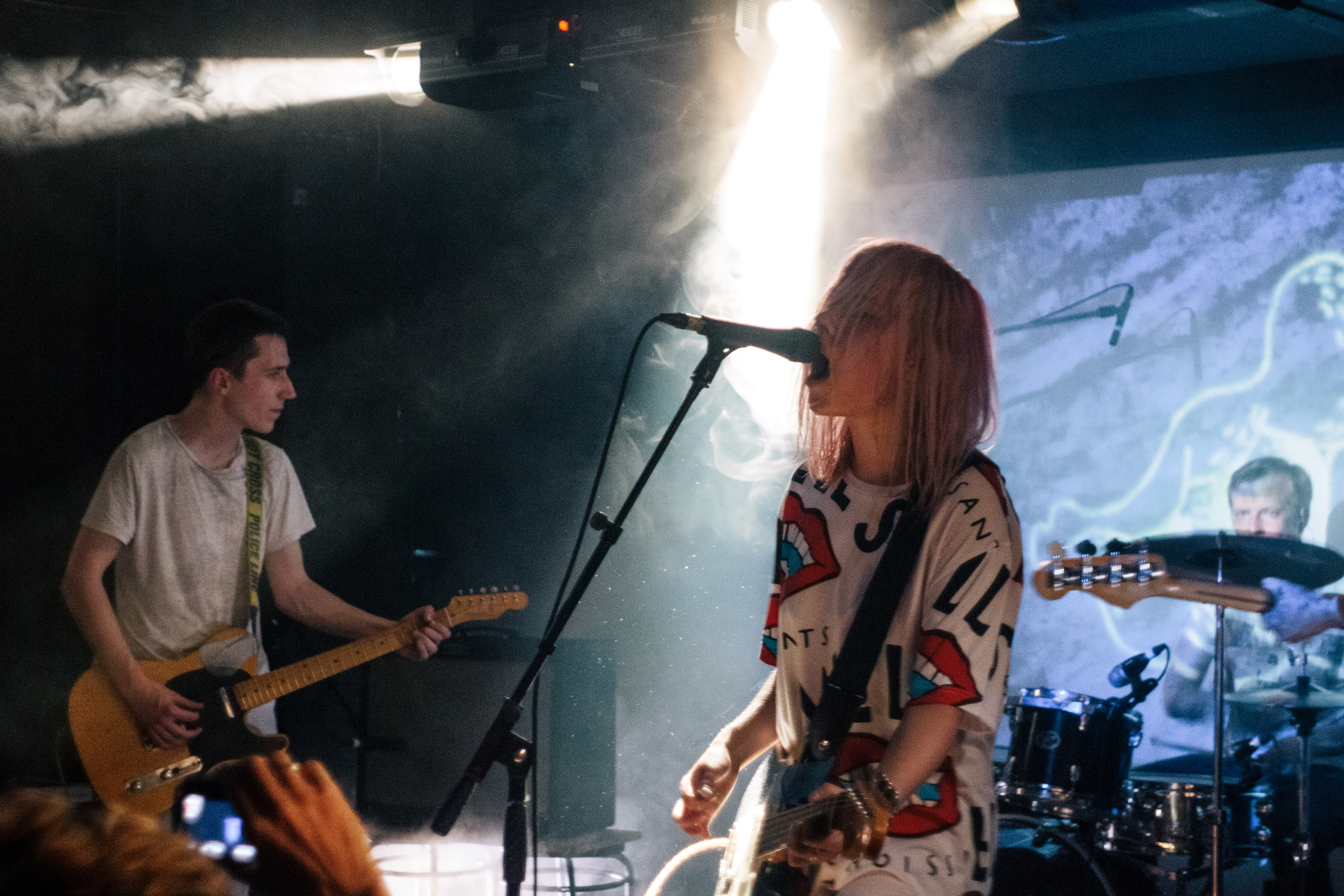
- Glintshake at Saint Petersburg on 11 July 2014

Background information
- Origin: Moscow, Russia
- Genres: Garage, indie, psychedelic, punk rock, art punk, post-punk
- Years active: 2012 – present
- Members: Ekaterina Shilonosova; Yevgeni Gorbunov; Yegor Sargsyan; Alexey Yevlanov
- Past members: Dmitry Midborn; Vasily Nikitin

Glintshake (Russian: ГШ) is a Russian rock band formed in Moscow in 2012, consisting of the vocalist and guitarist Ekaterina Shilonosova, the guitarist Yevgeni Gorbunov, the bass guitarist Yegor Sargsyan and the drummer Alexey Yevlanov.

== History ==
=== 2012–2014 ===
The founders of the band, Shilonosova and Gorbunov, met in Kazan. In 2011, Shilonosova moved to Moscow, where the band was formed the next year. Glintshake's first EP, Freaky Man, was recorded by Shilonosova and Gorbunov, and self-published in June 2012. In October it was followed by a music video for the title track "Freaky Man" starring artist Alexander Krivoshapkin.

The band played their first gig in Kazan on 17 November 2012, In March 2013, Glintshake released their second EP, Evil, and afterward were invited to several major festivals in Moscow, including Bosco Fresh Fest, Afisha Picnic and Faces & Laces. In August 2013, the band opened for The Smashing Pumpkins at Stadium Live in Moscow. Midborn left Glintshake the following autumn and was replaced by Yegor Sargsyan from the band Trud, while in early 2014 drummer Nikitin was replaced by Alexey Yevlanov from The Twiggys.

In May 2014, the band released its first album, Eyebones.

Rock quartet Glintshake started with a few simple and fast songs in the spirit of the nineties slacking alternative – on the new album the band played harder and more inventive, because of what it's natural to compare them with Sonic Youth and My Bloody Valentine. Glintshake promise to make a "magic and hypnosis session", and thanks to their new songs it sounds very believable. The current Glintshake is not going to spare the listeners – they sound noisy, violent, but at the same time very beautiful.

— Afisha

Glintshake released a video for the song "Wiuwiuwiu" in May 2014, which was filmed on an iPhone and edited in a single day. In November, the Nano Banana EP was released, recorded in a new studio near Moscow, owned by the Xuman Records label. According to Gorbunov, the EP was "free in terms of style", due to the band moving away from its 1990s music influence. At the end of 2014, Glintshake recorded the song "New Year of Hate" for Afisha's New Year's project.

=== 2015–present ===
Early in 2015, Glintshake re-recorded the song "Mu" from the Nano Banana EP in Russian. According to Shilonosova, the original English text had little overlap with the Russian lyrics, but its meaning and general atmosphere were not changed. The re-recorded version of "Мu" and "New Year of Hate" were released on the deluxe version of Nano Banana in June. In September, a music video for the song "Wrong Anthem" was released, created by illustrator Alexander Kostenko.

At the same time, the band announced that "good old Glintshake is coming to an end, but new and evil one is starting off". In an interview with the website Furfur, Gorbunov said that the band had decided to withdraw from 1990s alternative rock influence, stop singing in English and make a full turn in work: "…We've got a whole bunch of our own stuff: Zvuki Mu, russian avant-garde." In October, Glintshake released a single "Без пятнадцати пять" (Bez pyatnadtsati pyat', A quarter to five), paired with a music video, from an upcoming album. Another single, "Тени" (Teni, Shadows), was released in November.

In 2016, the band released an album in Russian ОЭЩ МАГЗИУ — a cryptic acronym in Russian, which can be transliterated in English as OESCH MAGZIU. In 2018, Glintshake's cover of Talking Heads' song "Psycho Killer" was used in the film Leto. Glintshake released their fourth album "Гибкий график" in July 2020.

== Band members ==
Current members

- Ekaterina Shilonosova – vocal, guitar (2012–present)
- Yevgeni Gorbunov – guitar (2012–present)
- Yegor Sargsyan – bass guitar (2013–present)
- Alexey Yevlanov – drums (2014–present)

Former members

- Dmitry Midborn – bass guitar (2012–2013)
- Vasily Nikitin – drums (2012–2014)

== Discography ==
=== Albums ===
- Eyebones (2014)
- ОЭЩ МАГЗИУ (2016)
- Польза (2018)
- Гибкий график (2020)

=== EPs ===
- Freaky Man (2012)
- Evil (2013)
- Dive (2014)
- Nano Banana (2014)
