= Pitchfork Music Festival 2014 =

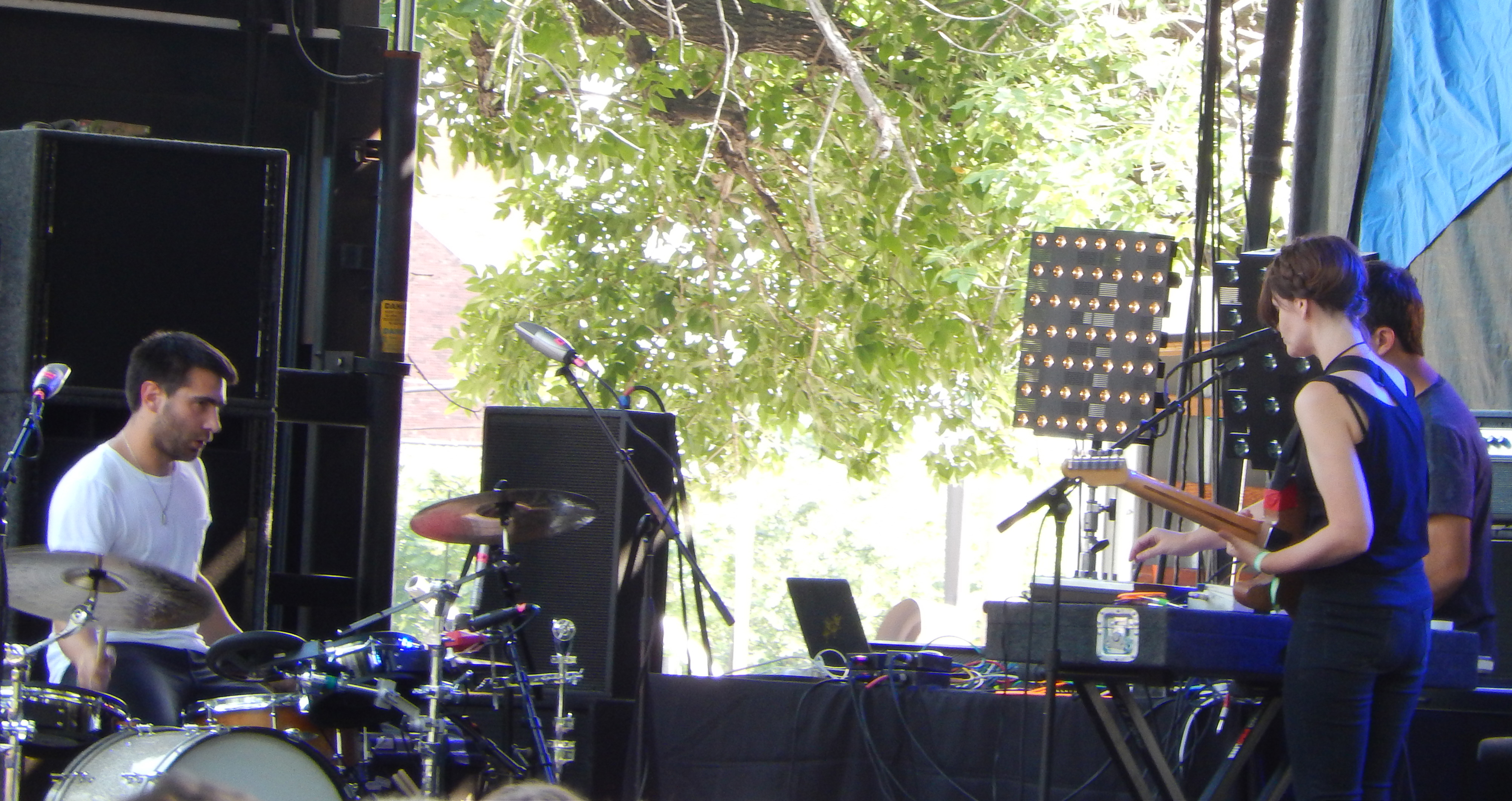
- Dates: July 18–20, 2014
- Locations: Union Park, Chicago, United States
- Website: pitchforkmusicfestival.com

The Pitchfork Music Festival 2014 was held on July 18 to 19, 2014 at the Union Park, Chicago, United States. The festival was headlined by Beck, Kendrick Lamar and Neutral Milk Hotel. English rock band Slowdive made their first concert in North America in over twenty years. American band The Julie Ruin cancelled their appearance after frontwoman Kathleen Hanna suffered from Lyme disease.

== Lineup ==
Headline performers are listed in boldface. Artists listed from latest to earliest set times.

Green
Friday, July 18	Saturday, July 19	Sunday, July 20
**Beck**; Sun Kil Moon; Neneh Cherry	**Neutral Milk Hotel**; Danny Brown; Pusha T Wild Beasts; Twin Peaks	**Kendrick Lamar**; Slowdive; Schoolboy Q Deafheaven; Mutual Benefit

Red
Friday, July 18	Saturday, July 19	Sunday, July 20
Giorgio Moroder; Sharon Van Etten; ~~Death Grips~~ (Note: Death Grips were scheduled to perform before announcing their breakup in early July.)	St. Vincent tUnE-yArDs; Cloud Nothings; Ka	Grimes; Real Estate; Earl Sweatshirt; DIIV

Blue
Friday, July 18	Saturday, July 19	Sunday, July 20
Avey Tare's Slasher Flicks; SZA; The Haxan Cloak; Factory Floor; Hundred Waters	FKA Twigs; The Field; Kelela; The Range; Mas Ysa; Empress Of; Circulatory System	Hudson Mohawke; DJ Spinn (Note: DJ Rashad and DJ Spinn were scheduled to perform, but DJ Rashad passed away in April 2014. DJ Spinn proceed to play solo.); Majical Cloudz; Jon Hopkins; Dum Dum Girls; Isaiah Rashad; Perfect Pussy; Speedy Ortiz
