= Heavy Moss =

Australian psychedelic-pop band

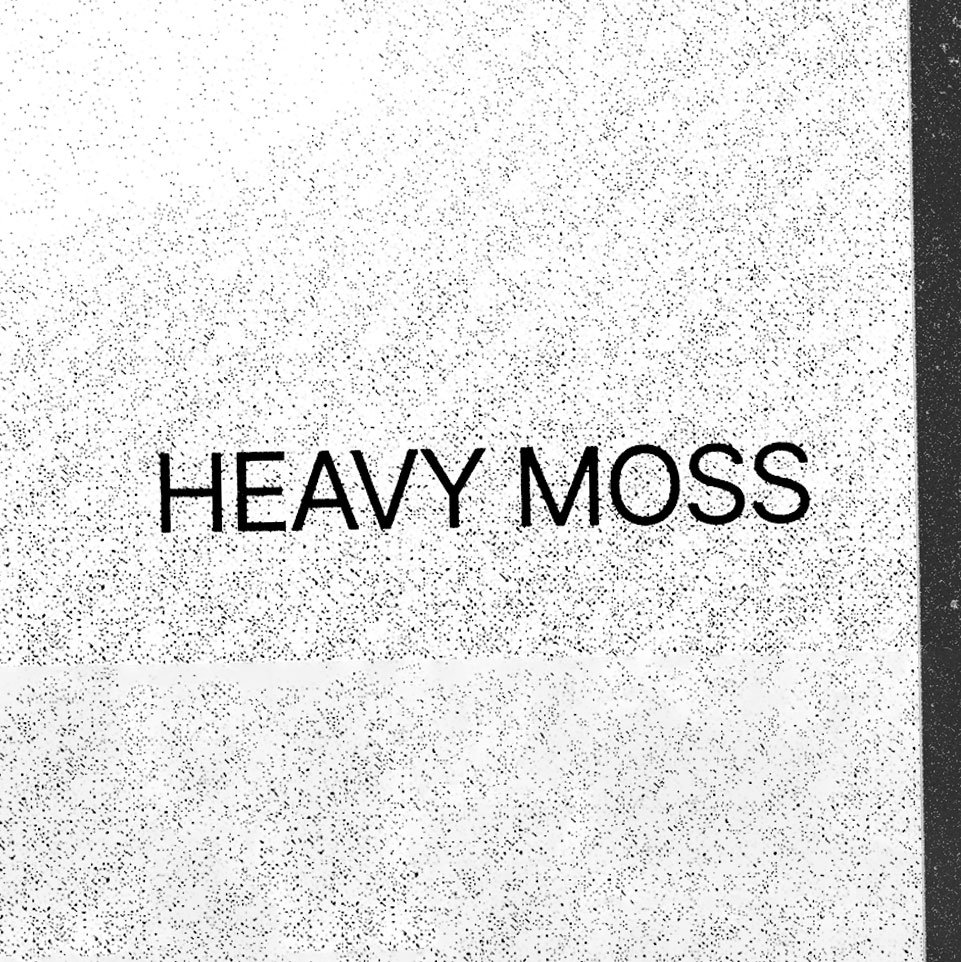

Background information
- Genre: Psychedelic pop
- Years active: 2022–present
- Label: P(doom) Records
- Spinoff of: King Gizzard & the Lizard Wizard
- Members: Lucas Harwood, Sam Ingles, Kyle Tickell, Bec Goring
- Website: heavymoss.bandcamp.com

Heavy Moss is an Australian psych-pop quartet led by King Gizzard & the Lizard Wizard bassist Lucas Harwood alongside Sam Ingles, Kyle Tickell, and Bec Goring.

== History ==
=== Foundation ===
Heavy Moss was formed due to a "spontaneous reunion" between Lucas Harwood and Sam Ingles in their hometown of Geelong, Victoria in 2022. The pair had previously been in a band named Atolls known for its 90's themed, gritty, retro-inspired sound. Harwood and Ingles work-shopped some of Harwood's songs that did not quite fit with King Gizzard and the Lizard Wizard, leaning more on psychedelic pop with inspirations from Elton John, King Krule, and Spacemen 3. Seeking a fresh direction, they brought in Kyle Tickell and Bec Goring to complete the lineup. The band has released their content under the p(doom) record label. Shortly after the band stabilized as a quartet they quickly released two singles: "Morning Milk" and "Summa". The former was mostly based on Harwood's style, while the latter was based on Ingles' style. Morning Milk is an Atolls original from their EP New Dream.

=== Dead Slow ===
The first album by Heavy Moss was Dead Slow, released on November 22, 2024. Half of the album was co-mixed by Harwood and King Gizzard and the Lizard Wizard frontman Stu Mackenzie while they were on tour, while the other half was mixed by Michael Badger, who mixed Nonagon Infinity. In preparation for its release, Heavy Moss released two singles from Dead Slow, "Star" and "Treadmills". Before the album was released, parts of it were played on speakers before King Gizzard and the Lizard Wizard shows during their 2024 tour.

The band has a collaborative approach to songwriting, with each member contributing to lyrics. Harwood stated that the album was "pretty split between mine, Kyle [Tickell]’s, and Sam [Ingles]’s songwriting" and that "Stu really gave me confidence to make some drastic sonic decisions."

In April 2025, the singles "Summa" and "Morning Milk" were released as part of Record Store Day. On April 9, 2025, Heavy Moss would give its first live performance at the Howler in Naarm giving live debuts to Dead Slow's Le con, Treadmills, Star, Cold, Melt, and Blutac as well as the singles Morning Milk and Summa. On April 10 the band would play at the Corner Hotel, also in Naarm, with the same set list.

== Discography ==
=== Studio albums ===
List of albums, with selected details
Title	Details
Dead Slow	Released: November 2024; Format: digital, LP; Label: p(doom) records (PDOOM-008LP)

=== Singles ===
List of singles, with selected details
Title	Year	Albums
"Morning Milk"	2023	Non-album single
"Summa"	2023	Non-album single
"Star"	2024	Dead Slow
"Treadmills"	2024	Dead Slow
