= The Salt Shed =

Music and entertainment venue in Chicago, Illinois

Coordinates: 41.9064°N 87.6593°W

- Interactive map of The Salt Shed
- Address: 1357 N Elston Ave, Chicago, IL 60642; United States
- Capacity: 5,000 (outdoor), 3,600 (indoor)

Construction
- Opened: August 3, 2022 (outdoor), February 18, 2023 (indoor)

Website
- www.saltshedchicago.com

The Salt Shed is an indoor and outdoor music venue/entertainment hub located in West Town, Chicago. The area was previously owned by Morton Salt before they relocated their facility. The outdoor section adjacent to the Chicago River and Goose Island, named "The Fairgrounds", holds a capacity of 5,500 people. The indoor section, named "The Shed", holds a capacity of 3,600 people.

== History ==
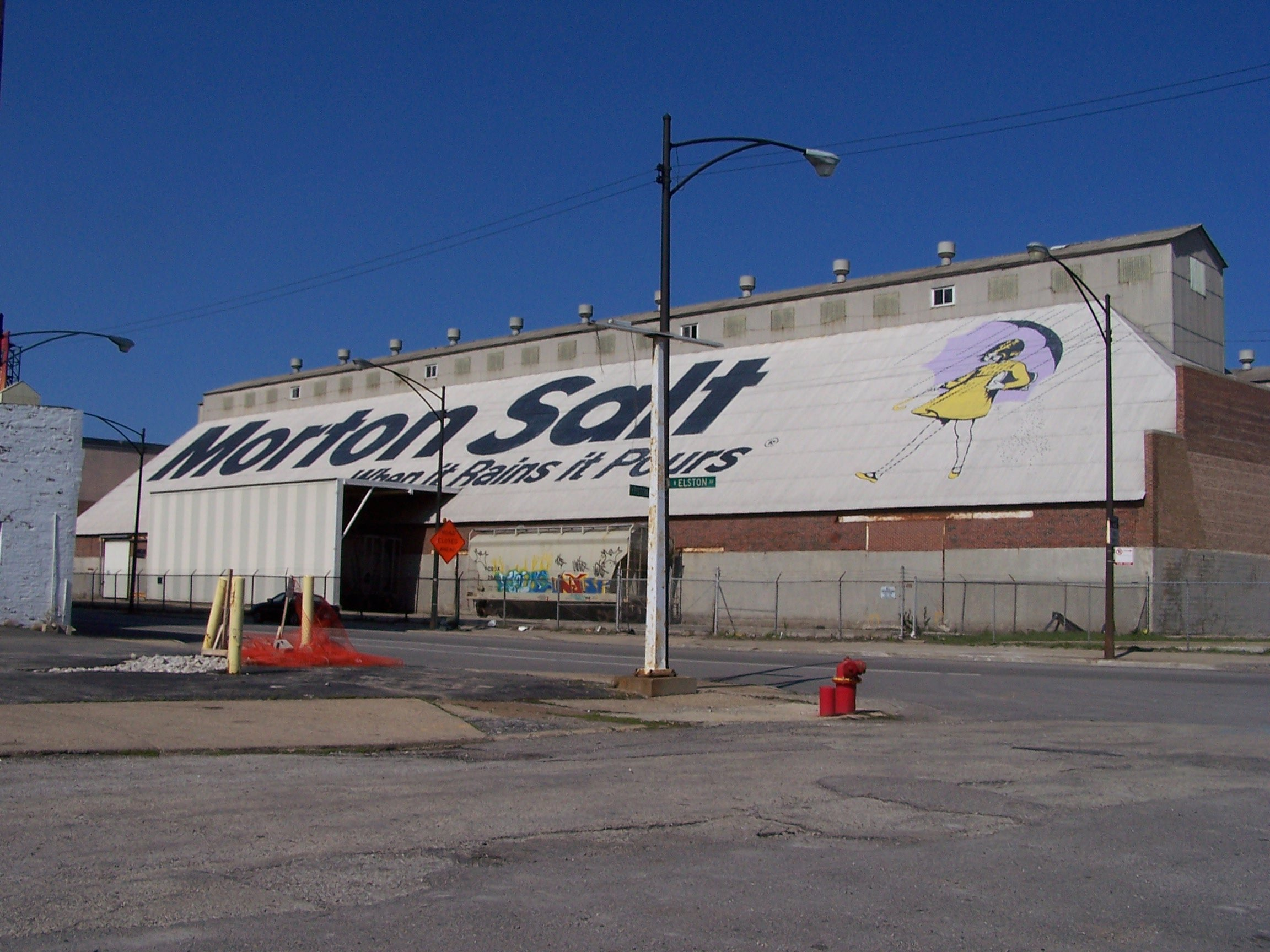
Morton Salt facility in May 2004

In 2015, Morton Salt relocated their packaging and warehousing facility, leaving the building that they previously used vacant. Chicago-based hospitality collective 16" on Center, Blue Star Properties, R2, and Sky Deck came together to repurpose the vacant building as a "multi-purpose creative hub, with music as its beating heart." The property was sold in 2017 for $15 million. After being designated as an official City of Chicago Landmark, the building went under a $50 million renovation designed by Aric Lasher of HBRA Architects.

The Fairgrounds opened to the public on August 3, 2022, with a performance by Fleet Foxes. After renovations were completed, The Shed opened to the public on February 18, 2023, with a performance by Big Gigantic.

In January 2025, Green Thumb Industries and The Salt Shed announced a two-year partnership to sell THC products on-site, including marijuana, gummies and chocolates, and THC Margaritas.

== Events ==
Since opening, The Salt Shed has hosted musical acts including Big Gigantic, Bishop Briggs, Brent Faiyaz, Cigarettes After Sex, Death Cab for Cutie, Fleet Foxes, Galantis, Japanese Breakfast, Run the Jewels, The Postal Service, The Roots, Thundercat, Tove Lo, Tycho, Ween, King Gizzard & the Lizard Wizard, Bladee, Godspeed You! Black Emperor, Panda Bear, and Toro y Moi. The venue has also held other types of events since opening such as EEEEEATSCON (food festival) and The Eric Andre Explosion (standup comedy show presented by Eric Andre).

Australian band King Gizzard and the Lizard Wizard recorded their live album Live in Chicago '23 during their performances at The Salt Shed on June 11–13, 2023. Swedish post-punk band Viagra Boys also recorded a concert film at the venue at their show on February 23, 2023, which was later streamed and released on YouTube.
