= Kate NV =

Russian singer-songwriter, producer, vocalist and designer

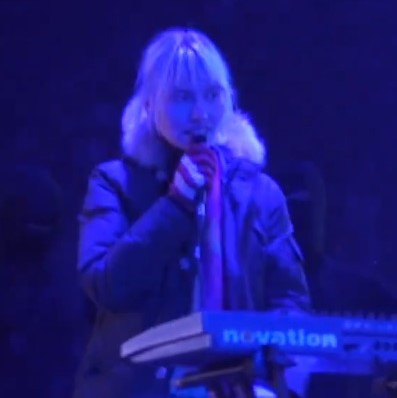
- Shilonosova performing in 2016

Background information
- Also known as: Kate Shilonosova
- Born: Ekaterina Yuryevna Shilonosova; August 1, 1988 (age 38); Kazan, Tatar ASSR, Russian SFSR, USSR
- Origin: Moscow, Russia
- Genres: Experimental pop
- Occupations: Singer; songwriter; record producer; designer
- Instruments: Vocals; guitar
- Years active: 2012–present
- Labels: RVNG Intl.; Plancha; Orange Milk
- Member of: Decisive Pink
- Website: katenv.com

Ekaterina Yuryevna Shilonosova (Russian: Екатерина Юрьевна Шилоносова, born August 1, 1988), known professionally as Kate NV, is a Russian singer, songwriter, record producer, and designer. Alongside her solo career, she is a member of the Moscow-based rock band Glintshake. Her debut solo album Binasu was released in 2016, followed by для = FOR in 2018 and Room for the Moon in 2020. In 2022, looking to raise funds for charity, she released her fourth album bouquet. Her fifth album, Wow, was released in March 2023. In June 2023, she released the collaborative album Ticket to Fame with Angel Deradoorian as the duo Decisive Pink.

== Background ==
Shilonosova attended and graduated university with a degree in architecture. After moving to Moscow in 2011, she worked a job as a video editor. Shilonosova participated in the 2018 TEDxMoscow event in which she performed a compositional piece. Shilonosova is a member of the Moscow Scratch Orchestra, a collective that makes music inspired by composer Cornelius Cardew.

== Career ==
=== Artistry ===
Shilonosova is known to play a Buchla synthesizer keyboard, as well as a Fender Jazzmaster and Fender Stratocaster electric guitar. During live performances, Shilonosova works with microphones, small percussion instruments, and sampling through Ableton Live. She is also known to improvise during her live performances with objects such as water glasses and bells. Shilonosova is currently signed to RVNG Records. She falls under the genres of experimental, pop, and electronic. She sings in Russian, English, and French. In 2022, Shilonosova and American musician Deradoorian formed the band Decisive Pink, being signed to Fire Records. In 2023, they released their first album together Ticket to Fame.

=== Influences ===
Shilonosova claims that much of her inspiration comes from Russian children's films, such as: Blue Puppy, Dot Dot Comma, and The Adventures of Elektronik. She admires the "deep thought behind superficial foolishness" of fairy tales and the nostalgia brought on by children's films.

In a 2020 interview with Pitchfork, Shilonosova detailed what inspiration was behind for Room for the Moon. She credits the Japanese cartoon Sailor Moon, Mary Poppins, Goodbye, Buratino, An Ordinary Miracle, the painting September 16 by René Magritte, in addition to composer John Cage and Russian musician Vladimir Presnyakov.

Shilonosova credits many signifiers from the 80s as her inspiration for Room for the Moon, as she grew up surrounded by the popular culture of that time. She is aesthetically inspired by playful musical genre of Japanese city pop, describing it as "goofy, crazy, free, authentic, imperfect".

=== Connection to the New Russian Wave of Music ===
Shilonosova's band Glintshake emerged from the growing Russian indie ('indi' in Russian) music scene in the early 2010s. Indi' music initially featured English lyrics and aligned itself with the global community of indie music. Post the early 2010s, Russia created a new music identity as a response to both Russian political tensions and a rising popularity in Anglophone music. This new music was deemed the New Russian Wave, and was centered around the notion that Russian indi' music was no longer based on identification with the Other, but identification with the Russian self. The New Russian Wave consists of 1980s and 1990s musical motifs that intended to develop nostalgia for a Pre-Putin era and to discover the roots of Russian identity through rejection of a Westernized image. Some requirements of the New Russian Wave are: the use of Russian language, lyrics about everyday life, a sonic lack of refinement, and basic execution of production. Shilonosova's band, Glintshake, took part in one of the central spaces for the circulation of the New Russian Wave, Festival Bol. Glintshake was chosen to go on a 2018 European tour to spread awareness about the New Russian Wave.

== Discography ==
=== Binasu (2016) ===
Binasu is Shilonosova's first solo release and is considered to be an experimental pop album, however it incorporates elements of Japanese city pop and electronica. It was released by Orange Milk Records in 2016 and consists and of ten tracks.

=== для FOR (2018) ===
для FOR is an experimental electronic album that consists of ten tracks inspired by Shilonosova's hometown of Moscow. для FOR is considered more abstract than her freshman album. The first track on the album, 'yxo EAR', was initially released on a compilation album which raised money for the LGBTQ2+ Center of Durham in North Carolina. The album was released with an online film series by Sasha Kulak.

=== Room for the Moon (2020) ===
Room for the Moon is Shilonosova's third album released under the Kate NV persona. The album consists of ten songs and is considered to be avant-pop and experimental. Room for the Moon is based on child nostalgia and was said to be recorded during "the loneliest period" of Shilonosova's life.

=== bouquet (2022) ===
bouquet is Shilonosova's fourth album, released on RVNG Intl. The album is a charity effort to raise funds for Helping to Leave, a Ukrainian organization that aids people seeking evacuation from areas of military conflict during the Russo-Ukrainian War.

=== Wow (2023) ===
Wow is the fifth studio album by Kate NV. It was released on March 3, 2023, and is preceded by its lead single "Oni (They)".
