= Ticket to Fame =

Studio album by Decisive Pink
- Released: June 9, 2023
- Genre: Minimal wave; synth-pop; art pop; electropop; krautrock
- Length: 49:59
- Label: Fire Records
- Producer: Kate NV

Kate NV chronology
Wow (2023)	Ticket to Fame (2023)	Room for the Moon Live! (2025)

Angel Deradoorian chronology
Find the Sun (2020)	Ticket to Fame (2023)

Singles from Ticket to Fame
- 1. "Haffmilch Holiday" Released: December 14, 2022; 2. "Destiny" Released: February 28, 2023; 3. "Ode to Boy" Released: April 11, 2023; 4. "Dopamine" Released: May 9, 2023

Ticket to Fame is the debut studio album by music duo Decisive Pink, composed of Russian musician Kate NV and American musician Angel Deradoorian. It was released on June 9, 2023, on Fire Records.

== Background and release ==
Kate NV and Angel Deradoorian announced Ticket to Fame on December 14, 2022. The two musicians wrote and recorded the album using a wide array of synthesizers at a studio in Cologne that Deradoorian referred to as the "synth-dome", before finishing production at Deradoorian's rehearsal space in Los Angeles. In a press release accompanying the album, the duo wrote that it touches on several themes, including "how we communicate in these uncertain times".

The album's announcement accompanied the release of the lead single "Haffmilch Holiday", which was inspired by the daily ritual of ordering cappuccinos with oat milk. The second single "Destiny" was released on February 28, 2023, alongside a music video in which the two musicians appear as moving paintings. On April 11, 2023, the duo released a music video for the album's third single "Ode to Boy", which alludes to the Ludwig van Beethoven composition "Ode to Joy" in its title and outro section. The album's final single "Dopamine", which satirizes online shopping and consumerism, was released on May 9, 2023, alongside a music video.

Following the release of Ticket to Fame on June 9, 2023, Decisive Pink announced a fall 2023 tour in the United States and Europe.

== Critical reception ==
Professional ratings
Aggregate scores
Source	Rating
Metacritic	78/100
Review scores
Source	Rating
AllMusic	3.5/5 stars
Beats Per Minute	8/10
Mojo	4/5 stars
Paste	7.9/10
Pitchfork	7.0/10
The Quietus	4/5 stars

Ticket to Fame received positive reviews from music critics. At Metacritic, the album received an aggregate score of 78 based on 8 reviews, indicating "generally favorable reviews".

In a review for AllMusic, writer Fred Thomas described the album as "a collection of experiments with electronics and giddy art pop, often moving swiftly between moments of danceable, krautrock-informed tunes and dizzying, beatless weirdness." Phillipe Roberts of Pitchfork wrote a 7.0/10 review of the album, praising its blend of "tongue-in-cheek krautrock hijinks" and "bright, retro-futuristic synth pop," while also commenting on the album's anticlimactic ending and the "white-hot ridiculousness" of the track "Potato Tomato". Zara Hedderman of The Quietus complimented the "vibrant palette of synths, floating flute accompaniments, exuberant drum samples and heavenly vocal harmonies between the duo," remarking that "especially throughout the opening half of the record, there's a strong '80s undercurrent to the buoyant electro-pop arrangements." In a review for Paste, Ben Salmon wrote, "Decisive Pink's debut is a dancing fountain of colorful tones, a wistful rocket ride through pixelated zones, an extravagant peacock's plumage of electro-pop and a guided tour of moods and textures achievable in synth music."

== Track listing ==
Ticket to Fame
No.	Title	Length
1.	"Haffmilch Holiday"	4:15
2.	"What Where"	3:58
3.	"Ode to Boy"	5:24
4.	"Destiny"	5:58
5.	"Potato Tomato"	3:07
6.	"Voice Message"	1:45
7.	"Cosmic Dancer"	7:10
8.	"Rodeo"	5:24
9.	"Interludé"	2:29
10.	"Dopamine"	5:51
11.	"Dusk"	4:32
Total length:		49:59
