= Mind Raft =

EP by Deradoorian
- Released: May 5, 2009
- Genre: Experimental rock
- Length: 22:17
- Label: Lovepump United Records
- Producer: David Longstreth

Deradoorian chronology
| Mind Raft (2009) | The Expanding Flower Planet (2015) |

Mind Raft is the solo debut EP released by former Dirty Projectors member Deradoorian. Its sound has been contrasted starkly with that of the Projectors' music.

== Critical reception ==
Professional ratings
Review scores
| Source | Rating |
|---|---|
| AllMusic | (unrated) |
| The Austin Chronicle | 3/5 stars |
| Pitchfork | 5.8/10 |
| Robert Christgau | (dud) |
| Tiny Mix Tapes | 3/5 stars |
| Under the Radar | 7/10 |

Mike Powell of Pitchfork gave Mind Raft a 5.8 out of 10, saying, "the songs wander and churn when it feels like they could develop, and ultimately, it's a record that I'll never mind having on but probably rarely reach for." Scott Tavener of Exclaim! described the EP as "an auspicious, if incomplete, introduction."

== Track listing ==
| No. | Title | Length |
|---|---|---|
| 1. | "Weed Jam" | 2:38 |
| 2. | "High Road" | 5:40 |
| 3. | "You Carry the Deed" | 3:26 |
| 4. | "Holding Pattern" | 4:30 |
| 5. | "Moon" | 6:06 |
| Total length: | | 22:17 |
