= Love Migrate =

Australian indie pop band

- Love Migrate at the time of their release of their first album: Plagued Are All My Thoughts, Like White Ants In The Fence

Background information
- Genres: Indie pop
- Years active: 2009/2011-2018
- Spinoff of: King Gizzard & the Lizard Wizard
- Past members: Eddie Alexander: Glen Smith; Casey Hartnett; Montey Hartnett; Eric Moore; Peter Sismanes; Bella Walker; Joey Walker
- Website: lovemigrate.bandcamp.com

Love Migrate was an Australian indie pop band from Melbourne formerly known as Goodnight Owl, consisting of Eddie Alexander, Casey Hartnett, Eric Moore, Peter Sismanes, Bella Walker and Joey Walker, although Moore and Bella Walker would leave the band before its dissolution, with Moore being replaced at drummer by Montey Hartnett.

== History ==
The band would form in 2011, consisting of a core of three members, including frontman and lead songwriter Eddie Alexander, Casey Hartnett, and Joey Walker. The band has been described as "evolving out of" Goodnight Owl, another band formed by Eddie Alexander shortly after deferring from university in 2008 with Eric Moore, Bella and Joey Walker, and a bassist named Glen Smith, and released a single EP, also titled Goodnight Owl in 2009. However, Alexander has gone on record saying that Goodnight Owl was simply renamed to Love Migrate. In around 2010 Casey Hartnett, who Alexander performed with in another band Sleep Decade, gradually replaced Glen Smith as the band transitioned into Love Migrate.

The band released their first album, the LP; Plagued Are All My Thoughts, Like White Ants In The Fence, on October 12, 2012, with the single Making This Hard released as a promotion. Beat described it as "a masterpiece" and as "ambitious, slow burning and just beautiful." This was the only Love Migrate release with Bella Walker credited, as she hadn't appeared in any subsequent, work. Tone Deaf noted their "Soft electric guitars and raw organic vocals" while saying the band was reminiscent of Dick Diver. The LP features previous crowd favorites, “Little Kid” and “Making This Hard” while also including new tracks with a distinct style. Plagued Are All My Thoughts, Like White Ants In The Fence would see the band break-out in the Melbourne Indie scene, and begin landing high-profile gigs and concerts at various hotels and other venues across the city, as well as being nominated for the Australian Music Prize.

The band would release their second album, an EP titled Dissolved, on 13 November 2013. The EP was described as "haunting and incredibly well composed" by Happy Magazine. The Music described the album as having both "jangly, pop sensibilities" and "softly arranged, relaxing style of folk."

On 21 May 2015 after an 18th month hiatus the band released another EP, Shimmer Through The Night. It was at this time when Beat described Love Migration as "criminally undervalued" and noted that the band was continually improving. The Music gave Shimmer Through The Night four-and-a-half stars out of five and as having an "anxious, lovelorn core." This would be the last Love Migrate project that Eric Moore would work on, being replaced on drums by Monty Hartnett, Casey's brother, between albums.

The band would release their last album, an LP titled Somewhere, Over The Mangroves on October 13, 2017, and unlike all prior albums, was not on Eric Moore's Flightless label, but rather on Lucas Harwood's Dusky Tracks family label. Two singles; In the Morning and Guillotine were released as a promotion for the album. Despite never formally issuing a statement about the band breaking up, the band quietly dissolved sometime in 2018, after a final show at the Grace Darling in Melbourne on 3 February 2018 which is still advertised on their Facebook page. The last post to the Love Migrate Facebook was a post on July 14, 2020, stating all proceeds from Somewhere, Over The Mangroves until August would go to Seed Mob, and that "We haven’t played or released new music in a while. Who knows if we will do it again."

== Discography ==
Title	Details
Plagued Are All My Thoughts, Like White Ants In The Fence	Released: 12 October 2012; Label: Flightless (FLT-003); Formats: CD, LP, digital download, streaming
Dissolved	Released: 13 November 2013; Label: Flightless (FLT-007); Formats: CD, EP, digital download, streaming
Shimmer Through The Night	Released: 21 May 2015; Label: Flightless (FLT-017); Formats: CD, EP, digital download, streaming
Somewhere, Over The Mangroves	Released: 13 October 2017; Label: Dusky Tracks; Formats: CD, LP, digital download, streaming

== Legacy ==
Walker and Moore were also members of King Gizzard and the Lizard Wizard prior to Love Migrate's formation, and during the band's entire existence. Joey's sister Bella, who collaborated on Plagued Are All My Thoughts, Like White Ants In The Fence, would also collaborate on the King Gizzard album K.G..

Casey and Monteny Hartnett continue to play together for Sleep Decade, another band that was signed to Flightless, sometimes with Alexander as a guest appearance.

The breakup of Love Migrate roughly correlated to when Joey Walker started his solo side-project as "Bullant".
