= Phantom Island (song) =

Single by King Gizzard & the Lizard Wizard

from the album Phantom Island
- Released: 29 October 2024
- Length: 5:16
- Label: P(doom)
- Songwriter(s): Stu Mackenzie
- Producer(s): Stu Mackenzie

King Gizzard & the Lizard Wizard singles chronology
"Raw Feel / Flight b741" (2024)	"Phantom Island" (2024)	"Antarctica / Sad Pilot" (2024)

"Phantom Island" is a single by Australian rock band King Gizzard and the Lizard Wizard, released on 29 October 2024 along with the announcement of their 27th studio album of the same name.

== Background ==
The song's title is a reference to phantom islands, a phenomenon on early maps showing islands widely accepted as existing, that in reality didn't exist, such as Pepys Island and Antillia. The single was released alongside the announcement that they would be releasing their 27th studio album. Additionally Stu Mackenzie and Ambrose Kenny-Smith explained that the album was developed alongside Flight b741 but that Flight b741 contained the more "rowdy" songs while the new album will be "more laidback." Alongside the announcement of the new album, the release of Phantom Island also coincided with the announcement of a new tour where the band will be working with various orchestras to play the new album.

== Recording ==
Stu Mackenzie stated that the song was initially developed with the intention to be the opening track of Flight b741 but that it had developed a "different vibe" and departed from the "thematic sense" of the album. Additional instrumentation was recorded at Allan Eaton Studios in St. Kilda, Victoria, Australia.

== Lyrics ==
An addition to the Gizzverse, the lyrics of the song tell the story as a continuation of Flight b741, seeing the pilot of Flight b741 flying to an island he had dreamed of. By the time they arrive the passengers are beset by imagined mythological gods and creatures and begin to lose their sanity.

== Live ==
During their World Tour 2024 the band teased Phantom Island during a rendition of "Boogieman Sam" in Arizona Financial Theatre on 9 November 2024.
