= The Expanding Flower Planet =

Studio album by Deradoorian
- Released: August 21, 2015
- Genre: Alternative rock; experimental pop
- Length: 46:16
- Label: Anticon
- Producer: Angel Deradoorian; Kenny Gilmore

Deradoorian chronology
Mind Raft (2009)	The Expanding Flower Planet (2015)	Eternal Recurrence (2017)

The Expanding Flower Planet is the first studio album by Deradoorian, a former member of Dirty Projectors. It was released on Anticon on August 21, 2015. Co-produced with Kenny Gilmore, it features contributions from Jeremy Hyman, Michael Lockwood, Niki Randa, and Arlene Deradoorian. The title of the album comes from a Chinese mandala tapestry that hung in Deradoorian's studio.

== Critical reception ==
Professional ratings
Aggregate scores
Source	Rating
Metacritic	78/100
Review scores
Source	Rating
AllMusic	3.5/5 stars
The A.V. Club	B
Consequence of Sound	B−
Exclaim!	8/10
The Guardian	4/5 stars
MusicOMH	4/5 stars
Pitchfork	8.0/10
PopMatters	8/10 stars
The Skinny	4/5 stars
Spin	6/10

At Metacritic, which assigns a weighted average score out of 100 to reviews from mainstream critics, The Expanding Flower Planet received an average score of 78, based on 17 reviews, indicating "generally favorable reviews".

Alex McCown of The A.V. Club gave the album a grade of B, saying, "Despite most songs consisting of little more than a simple drum beat, bass, and some synths buffeting Deradoorian's soaring and layered vocal tracks, it wouldn't be accurate to call the arrangements spare." Daniel Sylester of Exclaim! gave the album an 8 out of 10 and said, "On The Expanding Flower Planet, Deradoorian melds atmospheric dance beats with world music melodies, crafting a sound reminiscent of early Sinéad O'Connor."

Daniel Paton of MusicOMH gave the album 4 stars out of 5 and said, "Deradoorian has demonstrated here that she is a confident, mature and distinctive artist." John Paul of PopMatters gave the album 8 stars out of 10 and called it "a confident declaration of independence from a vital artist operating at the top of her creative game."

The Skinny placed it at number 47 on the "50 Best Albums of 2015" list.

== Track listing ==
No.	Title	Length
1.	"A Beautiful Woman"	3:31
2.	"Expanding Flower Planet"	4:26
3.	"Violet Minded"	5:33
4.	"Komodo"	4:38
5.	"Your Creator"	5:40
6.	"The Invisible Man"	4:54
7.	"Dark Lord"	2:56
8.	"Ouneya"	4:58
9.	"The Eye"	3:36
10.	"Grow"	6:04
Total length:		46:16

== Personnel ==
Credits adapted from liner notes.

- Angel Deradoorian – vocals, drums, guitar, bass guitar, banjo, synthesizer, flute, piano, production, recording, mixing, layout, design
- Kenny Gilmore – guitar, synthesizer, production, recording, mixing
- Arlene Deradoorian – vocals
- Niki Randa – vocals
- Jeremy Hyman – drums
- Michael Lockwood – drums
- Sonny Diperri – mixing
- Dave Cooley – mastering
- Daniel Higgs – cover artwork
- Brian DeRan – other artwork
- Bryant Rutledge – layout, design
