= C.O.F.F.I.N =

Australian punk, rock group

- Origin: Sydney, New South Wales, Australia
- Genre: Punk rock
- Years active: 2005–present
- Label: p(doom)
- Members: Ben Portnoy; Abijah Rado; Aaron Moss; Steven Kostogiannis
- Past members: Arthur Flanders; Ziggy McNeill; Clinton Vicelli; Laurence Adams; William De Moncheaux
- Website: www.coffinband.com

Starting in 2005, C.O.F.F.I.N (a backronym of Children of Finland Fighting in Norway) is a rock band from the Northern Beaches area of Sydney, New South Wales, Australia.

Their fifth studio album Australia Stops peaked at number 47 on the Australian Albums Chart and number 23 on the UK Albums Chart in September 2023.

== History ==
Originally formed on the Balgowlah Boys Campus by schoolmates Ben Portnoy (lead vocals and drums), Abijah Rado (lead guitar), Arthur Flanders (rhythm guitar) and Ziggy McNeill (bass), their debut studio album, Under the Influence was self released in 2010.. They followed this with Spring Break at the Aslyum in 2014.

In June 2018, the group worked with Jason Whalley to release their third studio album, Piss~Up.

In September 2020, the group released their self-titled album via Legless Records. The album was preceded by single "Fast Love". After this founding member, Arthur Flanders (Rhythm Guitar), left the band.

In September 2023, the group released their fifth studio album, Australia Stops. The album was preceded by singles "Cut You Off" and "Give Me a Bite" Lead Singer/Drummer, Ben Portnoy, called the album their "most well put together". The album was released following tours in North America and Europe.

In June 2026 the band signed with the record label p(doom), run by King Gizzard & the Lizard Wizard, who they had previously played in support of on that band's World Tour 2024. The announcement was accompanied by the release of a new single, ""Sleep in It" and documentary film 10,000 Miles From Oslo (presented by Up).

== Discography ==
=== Studio albums ===
List of studio albums, with selected details
Title	Album details	Peak chart positions	
Title	Album details	AUS	UK
Under the Influence	Released: 2010; Format: CD; Label: C.O.F.F.I.N	—	—
Spring Break at the Asylum	Released: May 2014; Format: CD, digital; Label: C.O.F.F.I.N	—	—
Piss~Up	Released: June 2018; Format: LP (limited to 150 copies), cassette (limited to 100 copies), digital; Label: C.O.F.F.I.N	—	—
Children of Finland Fighting in Norway	Released: September 2020; Format: LP, cassette, digital; Label: Legless (LEG-006)	—	—
Australia Stops	Released: 15 September 2023; Format: LP, digital; Label: Damaged Record Co. (DRC-010)	47	28
Out in Oslo	Released: 18 September 2026; Format: LP, digital; Label: p(doom)	8	—

=== Live albums ===
List of live albums, with selected details
Title	EP details
Live at the Leagues Club 15.06.18	Released: January 2019; Format: cassette (limited to 100 copies); Label: C.O.F.F.I.N; Recorded June 2018

=== Extended plays ===
List of EPs, with selected details
Title	EP details
On the Gronk	Released: August 2016; Format: 7" vinyl, digital; Label: C.O.F.F.I.N
Be Gone	Released: August 2019; Format: 7" vinyl, digital; Label: Bargain Bin Records (BB-003)
C.O.F.F.I.N / MINI SKIRT (split EP with Mini Skirt)	Released: September 2021; Format: 7" vinyl, (limited to 500 copies)

== Awards and nominations ==
=== AIR Awards ===
The Australian Independent Record Awards (commonly known informally as AIR Awards) is an annual awards night to recognise, promote and celebrate the success of Australia's Independent Music sector.

Year	Nominee / work	Award	Result	Ref.
2024	Australia Stops	Best Independent Heavy Album or EP	Nominated	

=== ARIA Music Awards ===
The ARIA Music Awards are a set of annual ceremonies presented by Australian Recording Industry Association (ARIA), which recognise excellence, innovation, and achievement across all genres of the music of Australia. They commenced in 1987.

Year	Nominee / work	Award	Result	Ref.
2024	Australia Stops	Best Hard Rock/Heavy Metal Album	Nominated	

=== National Live Music Awards ===
The National Live Music Awards (NLMAs) commenced in 2016 to recognise contributions to the live music industry in Australia.

Year	Nominee / work	Award	Result	Ref.
2023	C.O.F.F.I.N	Best Hard Rock or Heavy Metal Act	Won	
