= Wow (Kate NV album) =

Studio album by Kate NV
- Released: March 3, 2023
- Length: 40:52
- Label: RVNG Intl.
- Producer: Kate Shilonosova

Kate NV chronology
bouquet (2022)	Wow (2023)	Ticket to Fame (2023)

Singles from Wow
- 1. "early bird" Released: October 12, 2022; 2. "oni (they)" Released: December 6, 2022; 3. "meow chat" Released: January 30, 2023; 4. "confessions at the dinner table" Released: September 5, 2023

Wow is the fifth studio album by Russian pop musician Kate NV, released through RVNG Intl. on March 30, 2023. It has received positive reviews from critics.

== Reception ==
Professional ratings
Aggregate scores
Source	Rating
Metacritic	81 (nine reviews)
Review scores
Source	Rating
The Line of Best Fit	8/10
Loud and Quiet	8/10
Paste	8.1/10
Pitchfork	7.6/10
The Skinny	4/5 stars
Slant Magazine	4.5/5 stars
Uncut	7/10

Wow received positive reviews from critics noted at review aggregator Metacritic. It has a weighted average score of 81 out of 100, based on nine reviews.

In The Line of Best Fit, Joe Creely gave Wow an 8 out of 10, calling it "looser, giddier and full of real joy" than the artist's previous work, naming it "her finest work yet" and emphasizing how fun the listening experience is. In Loud and Quiet, this was chosen for Album of the Week, with critic Theo Gorst also giving it an 8 out of 10 for being "an expression of gleeful fun" and "2023’s funnest record". Writing for Paste, Devon Chodzin states that Kate NV "breaks conventions to maximize fun" and calls the listening to Wow "a rewarding experience that leaves one grinning ear to ear"; he rates it 8.1 out of 10.

Pitchfork's Sophie Kemp gave this album a 7.6 out of 10, calling this "pop music for people who enjoy both Karlheinz Stockhausen and Lisa Frank" and writing that the musicianship remains "rigorous" alongside being playful. In The Skinny, Patrick Gamble gave Wow four out of five stars, writing that it "blurs the line between intentional and incidental noise to celebrate the sonic richness of everyday life and the ability of sound to trigger memories" and "there’s an edge to this music that ensures it’s never merely wacky". In Slant Magazine, Paul Attard writes that the experimental album has Kate NV "function[ing] more as a court jester than a musician throughout Wow, where the listener is never quite allowed in on the joke—and the album is all the better for it" and he gave it 4.5 out of 5 stars. Stereogum featured this as Album of the Week, where James Rettig calling it a collection of "transcendent whirrs of saxophone and blooping synthesizers, there are pops and splats and slaps, door creaks and toy squeaks and the chitter of birds in the morning". In Uncut, Piers Martin gave this album a 7 out of 10, for making "a zany world of pixelated pop for her avatar Kate NV to stumble around, dazed and amused".

This was ranked the 10th best album of 2023 in Slant Magazine.

== Track listing ==
All songs written by Kate Shilonosova, except where noted

1. "oni (they)" (lyrics: Takahide “Foodman” Higuchi) – 4:20
2. "confessions at the dinner table" (Quinn Oulton and Shilonosova) – 3:30
3. "slon (elephant)" – 3:42
4. "asleep" – 2:45
5. "nochoi zvonok (night call)" – 5:37
6. "mi (we)" – 4:33
7. "early bird" – 2:38
8. "d d don’t" – 3:46
9. "razmishlenie (thinking)" – 4:23
10. "flu" – 3:12
11. "meow chat" – 2:27

Bonus tracks on the Japanese edition

12. "oni (they)" (Instrumental) – 4:20
13. "mi (we)" (Instrumental) – 4:33

== Personnel ==
- Kate NV – instrumentation, vocals, production
- Andrey Bessonov – clarinet on "early bird"
- OG Lullabies – violin on "early bird"
- Nami Sato – vocals on "early bird"
- Anne Taegert – mastering at Dubplates & Mastering, Berlin, Germany
- Will Work for Good – design

== See also ==
- List of 2023 albums
