= Angel Deradoorian =

American musician (born 1986)

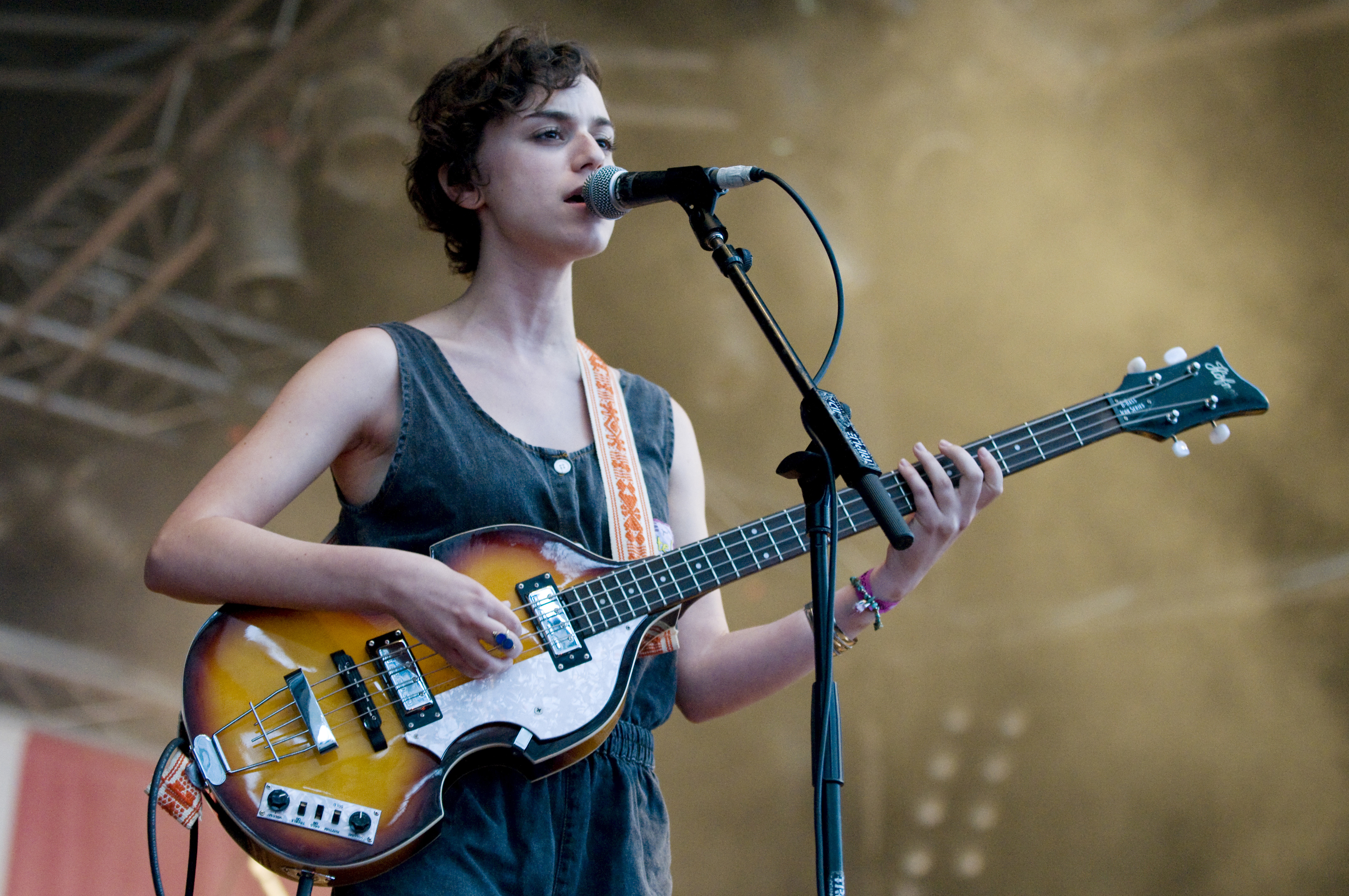
- Angel Deradoorian performing with Dirty Projectors in 2008

Background information
- Also known as: Deradoorian
- Born: July 18, 1986 (age 39)
- Origin: Los Angeles, California
- Genres: Art pop; indie pop; indie rock
- Occupations: Singer-songwriter; multi-instrumentalist; producer
- Instruments: Bass; guitar; keyboards; flute; vocals
- Years active: 2007–present
- Labels: Anticon; Lovepump United; Anti-
- Member of: Black Sabbath Cover Band Rehearsal; Decisive Pink
- Formerly of: Dirty Projectors

Angel Deradoorian (born July 18, 1986), also known mononymously as Deradoorian, is a musician based in Los Angeles, California. She is best known for her work with Dirty Projectors as full-time member from 2007 to 2012. She left to pursue a solo career. In 2015 she released a solo studio album, The Expanding Flower Planet.

== Life and career ==
Born and raised in Orangevale, California and of Armenian descent, Deradoorian first found an interest in music at the age of five, when she was taught violin and piano at the private school she attended. Both her parents are artists and she has an older sister Arlene, who also tours with her performing solo material. At the age of 16 she decided to leave school and pursue a career in music. She moved to Brooklyn, joined Drive-thru Records band An Angle and then shortly after in 2007 she joined Dirty Projectors and played an important role in the recording of the album Bitte Orca. In 2012, she moved to Los Angeles together with her then-boyfriend Avey Tare.

Deradoorian's debut EP, Mind Raft, was released under her surname in 2009 by Lovepump United Records. In 2009, she recorded a track with Vampire Weekend keyboardist Rostam Batmanglij and Ra Ra Riot vocalist Wes Miles on their Discovery album LP. The track is entitled "I Wanna Be Your Boyfriend". Animal Collective chose her to perform at the All Tomorrow's Parties festival that they curated in 2011. In 2011, she released a split 7-inch with Albert McCloud containing a song by McCloud entitled "Planetarium 2010" and her own song "Marichka". She was a member of Avey Tare's project, Slasher Flicks, along with ex-Ponytail drummer Jeremy Hyman, and released the album Enter the Slasher House in 2014.

In 2015, Deradoorian released her debut solo studio album, The Expanding Flower Planet, on Anticon. In 2017, she released an EP titled Eternal Recurrence, which mixes obscure and ambient landscapes. Her second full-length solo album, Find the Sun, was released on September 18, 2020, by record label Anti-.

In 2022, Deradoorian and Russian musician Kate NV formed the duo Decisive Pink, releasing the 2023 album Ticket to Fame on Fire Records. She released her third solo studio album, Ready for Heaven, in 2025.

== Discography ==
=== Studio albums ===
- The Expanding Flower Planet (2015)
- Find the Sun (2020)
- Ready for Heaven (2025)

=== Compilation albums ===
- Disembodied Improvisations Vol. 1 (2019)

=== EPs ===
- Mind Raft (2009)
- Eternal Recurrence (2017)

=== Singles ===
- "Marichka" b/w "Planetarium 2010" (2011) (split with Albert McCloud)
- "Mountainside" (2017)

=== Guest appearances ===
- An Angle - “We Can Breathe Under Alcohol”
- Discovery – "I Wanna Be Your Boyfriend" from LP (2009)
- The Roots – "A Peace of Light" from How I Got Over (2010)
- U2 – "Ordinary Love" from Songs of Innocence (2013)
- U2 – "The Troubles" from Songs of Innocence deluxe edition (2014)
- Flying Lotus – "Siren Song" from You're Dead! (2014)
- Avey Tare’s Slasher Flicks – Enter the Slasher House (2014)
- Brandon Flowers – "Dreams Come True", "Can't Deny My Love", "Still Want You", "Between Me And You", and "Diggin' Up The Heart" from The Desired Effect (2015)
- Boots – "Aquaria" from Aquaria (2015)
- Hamilton Leithauser + Rostam – "1959" from I Had a Dream That You Were Mine (2016)
- Avey Tare – Eucalyptus (2017)
- Rostam – "Hold You" from Half-Light (2017)
- Boots – "Language" (2020)
