= Grow Wings and Fly =

Single by King Gizzard and the Lizard Wizard

from the album Phantom Island
- Released: 13 May 2025
- Length: 5:08
- Label: P(doom)

King Gizzard and the Lizard Wizard singles chronology
"Deadstick" (2025)	"Grow Wings and Fly" (2025)	"Level 5" (2026)

Music video
- "Grow Wings and Fly" on YouTube

"Grow Wings and Fly" is the third single from the album Phantom Island by the rock band King Gizzard & the Lizard Wizard.

== Background ==
"Grow Wings and Fly" originally began as a continuation of "Shanghai", however, the first mention of it as a separate track was at the 2024 Germania Insurance Amphitheatre show in Austin, Texas. It was then announced as a part of Phantom Island on 15 April, on the band's Instagram.

== Release ==
The first verse mirrors the lyrics of "Shanghai", off of Butterfly 3000, and the theme mirrors "Le Risque", off of Flight b741, as the song's lyrics are about taking risks, casting off self-doubt, and living life to its fullest.

== Reception ==
It has been called a "breezy tune" by Stereogum, and Spin magazine said "King Gizzard & the Lizard Wizard soar heavenward with the smily, major-key jam 'Grow Wings and Fly'.

== Music video ==
The music video, which was directed by Hayden Somerville, starts with Ambrose Kenny-Smith as a washed up fish-like humanoid, that is then carried into the sea by his band-mates, Cook Craig, Joey Walker, Michael Cavanagh, and Lucas Harwood. Ambrose, now playing a fisherman, reminisces over a photo with him and Stu Mackenzie, and then spends all day battling to reel in and catch his fish-like self, with a ghost of Stu smiling and waving at the end after he succeeds and fish-Ambrose dies. When talking about the music video, Somerville said "There are so many strange and beautiful ways to grow wings and fly, we had a very special time down the coast with the band and our crew, releasing our sea creature — who somehow makes me feel a little ill and completely full of joy at the same time."
