= Deadstick (song) =

Single by King Gizzard and the Lizard Wizard

from the album Phantom Island
- Released: 15 April 2025
- Length: 3:36

King Gizzard and the Lizard Wizard singles chronology
"Antarctica / Sad Pilot" (2024)	"Deadstick" (2025)	"Grow Wings and Fly" (2025)

Music video
- "Deadstick" on YouTube

"Deadstick" is a single by Australian rock band King Gizzard and the Lizard Wizard, released on 15 April 2025, as part of their 27th studio album Phantom Island.

== Background ==
Announced on April 9, "Deadstick" is the second single from the band's 27th studio album Phantom Island. The single's name is a reference to deadsticking, or when a plane propeller stops mid-flight. The single's release coincided with a statement that the new album will come out on June 13, 2025.

== Lyrics ==
An entry into the "Gizzverse", a shared story across KGLW songs, the lyrics of the song revolve around Flight b741 flying into a storm and being forced to make a deadstick landing on an island. As with the rest of the album, the song's lyrics are less grounded but more melancholy when compared to Flight b741.

== Reception ==
BrooklynVegan described the track as "a horn-filled, boogie-forward soulful rock song" while XS noize described it as "a giddy jazz-rock riot".

== Music video ==
The music video, directed by Guy Tyzak, features the band dressed as air-force pilots, and actors dressed as tourists and the devil, dancing around a massive plane made out of cardboard that appears to have crashed.
