= Eternal Recurrence (EP) =

EP by Deradoorian
- Released: October 6, 2017
- Recorded: 2015–2016
- Genre: Alternative rock; experimental pop
- Length: 28:58
- Label: Anticon
- Producer: Angel Deradoorian; Ben Greenberg

Deradoorian chronology
The Expanding Flower Planet (2015)	Eternal Recurrence (2017)	Find the Sun (2020)

Eternal Recurrence is an EP by Deradoorian, a former member of Dirty Projectors. Recorded between 2015 and 2016, it was released on Anticon on October 6, 2017.

== Critical reception ==
Professional ratings
Aggregate scores
Source	Rating
Metacritic	72/100
Review scores
Source	Rating
AllMusic	3.5/5 stars
Exclaim!	7/10
Pitchfork	7.4/10
PopMatters	7/10 stars
Under the Radar	5/10 stars

At Metacritic, which assigns a weighted average score out of 100 to reviews from mainstream critics, Eternal Recurrence received an average score of 72, based on 5 reviews, indicating "generally favorable reviews".

Paul Simpson of AllMusic gave Eternal Recurrence 3.5 stars out of 5, calling it "a fine, thoughtful piece of ambient drone-folk that is as challenging as it is assuring." He said, "The release clocks in at less than half an hour, but its meditative nature transcends time, and it feels like a complete work rather than a minor batch of non-album tracks." Scott A. Gray of Exclaim! gave Eternal Recurrence a 7 out of 10, stating that "[Eternal Recurrence] pulls back on the rhythmic side of her intercontinental folkloric psychedelia in favour of something more meditative, untethered and texturally focused."

== Track listing ==
No.	Title	Length
1.	"Love Arise"	4:31
2.	"Return-Transcend"	8:16
3.	"Ausar Temple"	2:29
4.	"Nia in the Dark"	4:20
5.	"Mountainside"	4:00
6.	"Mirrorman"	5:22
Total length:		28:58

== Personnel ==
Credits adapted from liner notes.

- Angel Deradoorian – production, additional recording
- Ben Greenberg – arrangement (3), production, engineering, mixing
- Dave Cooley – mastering
- Safwan Dahoul – artwork
- Low Limit – layout
