= Atolls (band) =

Australian surf-rock band

Background information
- Genre: Surf rock
- Years active: 2011-2014
- Spinoff of: King Gizzard & the Lizard Wizard
- Past members: Lucas Skinner, Sam Ingles, Oli Grinter
- Website: atolls.bandcamp.com

Atolls was an Australian surf-rock (Note: sometimes labeled as "fuzz-pop" due to their frequent usage of distortion) trio from Geelong (Note: Sometimes lumped together with Melbourne) fronted by Lucas Harwood from King Gizzard & the Lizard Wizard alongside Sam Ingles and Oli Grinter that existed from 2011 to 2014.

== History ==
Atolls was described as the leading surf-rock band coming out of the crowded Geelong surf-rock scene. Their debut singles; Mumble and Water, would be released as a joint b-side which won Time Off's "Single Of The Week." Lucas is a strong supporter of preserving cassettes as a form of media, and advocated strongly for the bands music to be released on tape. Mumble and Water would later be released as part of the band's debut EP Hair Machine which was largely based on demos that Skinner created that fell outside King Gizzard & the Lizard Wizard's style. Inpress considered Hair Machine a potential "slacker anthem-of-the-year."

The band would release a second EP, New Dream, the following year described as a "mixture of high and earthy tones" and "laidback, garage goodness." In the buildup to its release the band released one of the EP's songs, Dwell Breaker as a single.

== Style ==
The band was described as a middle ground between The Black Rebel Motorcycle Club and The Dandy Warhols with a blend of psych-rock and surf-rock similar to The Black Lips. Near the end of the bands existence it was described as "criminally undervalued and perpetually overlooked."

== Discography ==
=== Singles ===
- Dwell Breaker
- Mumble
- Water
- Worn

=== EPs ===
- Hair Machine (April 2013)
- New Dream (April 2014)

== Legacy ==
Lucas reunited with Ingles to form Heavy Moss a psych-pop quartet.
