= Room for the Moon =

Studio album by Kate NV
- Released: June 12, 2020
- Length: 46:59
- Language: Russian
- Label: RVNG Intl.
- Producer: Kate NV

Kate NV chronology
для FOR (2018)	Room for the Moon (2020)	bouquet (2022)

Singles from Room for the Moon
- 1. "Sayonara" Released: March 18, 2020; 2. "Marafon 15" Released: April 28, 2020; 3. "Plans" Released: May 26, 2020; 4. "Lu Na" Released: October 7, 2020; 5. "Tea" Released: April 15, 2021; 6. "Telefon" Released: October 20, 2021; 7. "Ça Commence Par" Released: July 6, 2022

Room for the Moon is the third studio album by Russian musician Kate NV. It was released on June 12, 2020, by RVNG Intl. The album consists of 14 tracks and incorporates elements of electronic and experimental music. It followed Kate NV's previous studio album, для For (2018).

== Background and composition ==
Written after Kate NV's 2018 album "для FOR," which had been based largely around synthesizer work, "Room for the Moon" was largely inspired by Japanese and Soviet pop songs from the 1980's. The album includes songs sung in Russian, English, French, and Japanese.

== Critical reception ==
Professional ratings
Aggregate scores
Source	Rating
Metacritic	84/100
Review scores
Source	Rating
Beats Per Minute	85%
Clash	8/10
The Line of Best Fit	8/10
Pitchfork	8.0/10

Room for the Moon was met with widespread acclaim reviews from critics. Jay Singh of The Line of Best Fit said "Room for the Moon appears to have it all, whilst remaining cohesive—it's an eccentric entity in itself, but also the work of one." Terrence O'Brien of The Verge described the album as a "fairy tale rendered in snappy Talking Heads-esque bass, proggy synths, and reverbed drum machines."

=== Accolades ===
Accolades for Room for the Moon
Publication	Accolade	Rank	Ref.
Pitchfork	The 50 Best Albums of 2020	42	

== Track listing ==
All tracks are written by Kate NV.

Room for the Moon – Standard edition
No.	Title	Length
1.	"Not Not Not"	5:15
2.	"Du Na"	4:48
3.	"Sayonara" (Full Moon Version)	6:26
4.	"Ça Commence Par"	3:16
5.	"Marafon 15"	5:23
6.	"Tea" (Full Cup Version)	3:39
7.	"Lu Na"	4:37
8.	"Plans"	5:38
9.	"If Anyone's Sleepy"	3:21
10.	"Telefon"	4:36
Total length:		46:59

Room for the Moon – CD edition
No.	Title	Length
11.	"Sayonara" (Single edit)	5:15
12.	"Tea" (Small Sip edit)	1:44
Total length:		53:58

Room for the Moon – Japanese CD edition
No.	Title	Length
13.	"Arigato Song"	3:19
Total length:		57:16
