= U.S. Residency Tour =

2023 concert tour by King Gizzard & the Lizard Wizard

King Gizzard & the Lizard Wizard US Residency Tour
- Tour by King Gizzard & the Lizard Wizard
- Start date: 28 May 2023
- End date: 21 June 2023
- Legs: 1
- No. of shows: 15

King Gizzard & the Lizard Wizard concert chronology
- Europe and UK Tour 2023 (2023); U.S. Residency Tour (2023); World Tour 2024 (2024)

King Gizzard & the Lizard Wizard's US Residency Tour was a concert tour of the United States that took place during June 2023. It began on 28 May 2023 with the band's performance at Boston Calling, and concluded on 21 June 2023 at the Hollywood Bowl in Hollywood Hills, California.

The tour was announced on social media by bassist Lucas Harwood on 15 November.

== History ==
According to frontman Stu Mackenzie, the residency concept was inspired by the tendency of some fans of the band to attend multiple shows. He told SPIN:

It’s honestly shocking, amazing, and beautiful that all these people come to multiple shows. It’s like, fuck! We’ve got to put on something good for them, because they’re the ultimate fans. That started as us trying to do unique shows every night and play a bunch of different songs, and it has evolved into us challenging ourselves to make it even more special. That feedback loop of us enjoying it, more people coming, and the venues getting bigger has led us to that place where we want to do three nights in a city so we can do three different shows, and hopefully a lot of people will come to all three.

The concept proved successful, with the band's shows at the Caverns in Pelham, Tennessee selling out so quickly that a fourth night had to be added. The band's shows at the Salt Shed would be made into the live album Live In Chicago '23 while their performance at the Caverns was made into the live album Live at The Caverns '23.

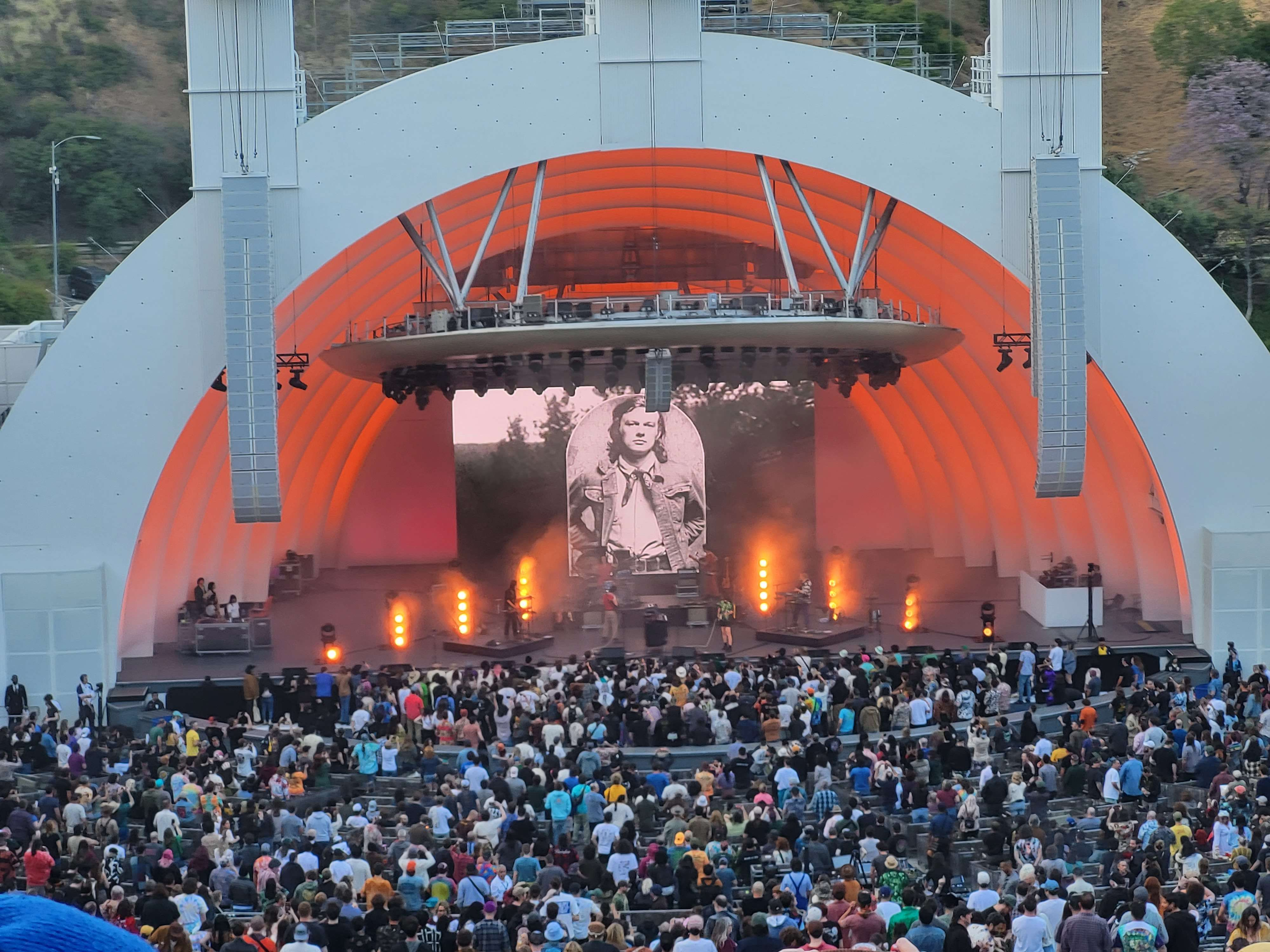
The band paying tribute to Smith

The band's show at the Hollywood Bowl, at the time their largest yet, was planned to feature a guest appearance from Broderick Smith, father of keyboardist, harmonicist and vocalist Ambrose Kenny-Smith. They had planned for Smith to narrate tracks from the band's second album, Eyes Like the Sky. Smith would pass before the tour began, however, with the band opting to pay tribute at the beginning of the show. In a concert review for PopMatters, Greg M. Schwartz called it a "touching tribute" and a "poignant moment in King Gizzard & the Lizard Wizard history".

== Reception ==
The tour attracted praise for its large and varied sets. In a review for Atwood Magazine, Max Kalnitz said of the tour "To say these shows were special would be an understatement. In the same way that Deadheads look back on the spring of 1977 and Phish fans do for the fall of 1997, I think Gizz fans will look back on the residencies of 2023 and acknowledge that they were some of the best shows the band ever played."

== Tour dates ==
List of concerts
Date	City	Venue	Notes
May 28, 2023 (Note: Added after tour announcement.)	Boston	Boston Calling	—N/a
June 1, 2023	Pelham	The Caverns Underground	—N/a
June 2, 2023	Pelham	The Caverns Underground	—N/a
June 3, 2023	Pelham	The Caverns Amphitheatre	—N/a
June 4, 2023 (Note: Added after tour announcement.)	Pelham	The Caverns Amphitheatre	—N/a
June 7, 2023	Morrison	Red Rocks Amphitheatre	—N/a
June 8, 2023	Morrison	Red Rocks Amphitheatre	Two shows in one day, one early and one late
June 11, 2023	Chicago	The Salt Shed	—N/a
June 12, 2023	Chicago	The Salt Shed	—N/a
June 13, 2023	Chicago	The Salt Shed	—N/a
June 16, 2023	Carnation	Remlinger Farms	—N/a
June 17, 2023	Carnation	Remlinger Farms	—N/a
June 18, 2023	Carnation	Remlinger Farms	—N/a
June 21, 2023	Los Angeles	Hollywood Bowl	3-hour marathon set
