= Find the Sun =

Studio album by Deradoorian
- Released: September 18, 2020
- Studio: Panoramic House (Marin County, California, U.S.)
- Genre: Psychedelic rock; folk rock; krautrock; psychedelic folk
- Length: 53:34
- Label: Anti-

Deradoorian chronology
Eternal Recurrence (2017)	Find the Sun (2020)	Ready for Heaven (2025)

Find the Sun is the second studio album by American indie musician and former Dirty Projectors member Deradoorian. It was released by Anti- on September 18, 2020.

== Background ==
Find the Sun was announced on March 10, 2020, with an initial release date of May 22, 2020. Also announced were Deradoorian's 2020 tour dates, in which she planned to join Stereolab on their 2020 reunion tour. Deradoorian began writing most of the songs in the summer of 2019, with some songs having been started in the previous summer. The writing for all songs was completed in the summer of 2019. The creation process for the album started in Rockaway, Queens. The album was then recorded at Panoramic House, a recording studio in Marin County, California. While the album was still in development, Deradoorian attended a Vipassana retreat in complete silence for ten days, which led Samer Ghadry and Dave Harrington to join the track as collaborators.

== Release ==
The lead single, "Saturnine Night", was released on March 10, 2020. A second single, "Monk's Robes", was released on April 21, 2020, alongside the announcement of the album's postponement and the cancellation of her tour due to the COVID-19 pandemic. "It Was Me" was released next on May 19, 2020. A fifth single, "Mask of Yesterday", was released on August 5, 2020.

== Critical reception ==
Professional ratings
Aggregate scores
Source	Rating
AnyDecentMusic?	7.4/10
Metacritic	76/100
Review scores
Source	Rating
AllMusic	3.5/5 stars
Clash	8/10
Exclaim!	8/10
The Line of Best Fit	8/10
Mojo	3/5 stars
PopMatters	8/10 stars
Q	4/5 stars
The Sydney Morning Herald	5/5 stars
Uncut	7/10

Find the Sun was met with generally positive reviews. At Metacritic, which assigns a normalized rating out of 100 to reviews from mainstream publications, the album received an average score of 76, based on nine reviews. Aggregator AnyDecentMusic? gave it 7.4 out of 10, based on their assessment of the critical consensus. Album of the Year assessed the critical consensus as 78 out of 100, based on eleven reviews.

In a five star review for The Sydney Morning Herald, Barnaby Smith compared the album to the works of Can, Trees, Wildbirds & Peacedrums, Pink Floyd, and Gil Scott-Heron. John Aizlewood of Mojo was more tepid in his review, noting 'it doesn't work when she wails and chants her way through the closing "Sun" ... the climax to "Red Den" is a choral feast, and "It Was Me" is a slab of surprisingly crisp pop'.

=== Accolades ===
Accolades for Find the Sun
Publication	Accolade	Rank
Pitchfork	The 35 Best Rock Albums of 2020	—

== Track listing ==
All tracks are written by Angel Deradoorian.

No.	Title	Length
1.	"Red Den"	4:43
2.	"Corsican Shores"	3:44
3.	"Saturnine Night"	7:06
4.	"Monk's Robes"	4:47
5.	"The Illuminator"	9:19
6.	"Waterlily"	2:06
7.	"It Was Me"	4:26
8.	"Devil's Market"	5:30
9.	"Mask of Yesterday"	3:58
10.	"Sun"	7:55
Total length:		53:34

== Personnel ==
Credits adapted from liner notes.

- Angel Deradoorian – vocals, flute, guitar, bass guitar (1, 4, 7, 9), synthesizer, production, design
- Samer Ghadry – drums, timpani, percussion, production, engineering
- Dave Harrington – bass guitar (2, 3, 5, 8, 10), electronics, conga, percussion
- Adam Gonsalves – mastering
- Sean Stout – photography, design
