= Enter the Slasher House =

Studio album by Avey Tare's Slasher Flicks
- Released: April 7, 2014
- Genre: Pop; psychedelic rock; indie rock
- Length: 49:39
- Label: Domino
- Producer: Avey Tare's Slasher Flicks

Singles from Enter the Slasher House
- 1. "Little Fang" Released: February 10, 2014

Enter the Slasher House is the only album by Avey Tare's Slasher Flicks, a group consisting of Avey Tare of Animal Collective, ex-Dirty Projectors member Angel Deradoorian, and ex-Ponytail drummer Jeremy Hyman. The first single from the album, "Little Fang", was named "Best New Track" by Pitchfork.

== Critical reception ==
In his brief review for Rolling Stone, Mike Ayers stated the record "has nothing to do with horror films and much to do with psychedelic rock." Andy Beta of Spin echoed this, saying that "despite both band and album name, Slasher Flicks' sound is less haunted house than funhouse: dense, noisy, with squiggles of analog synth that recall AnCo's Centipede Hz."

Stuart Berman of Pitchfork compared the first track "A Sender" to two songs from the discography of Avey Tare's main group Animal Collective: "Did You See the Words" from 2005's Feels and "Peacebone" from 2007's Strawberry Jam, claiming its "bouncing-ball momentum...follows in the foot-stomps" of those "two totemic AC openers." Beta noted "A Sender"'s "opening analog synth...suggest an ominous horror movie atmosphere, but it soon gives way to a near-punk drive."

Professional ratings
Aggregate scores
Source	Rating
Metacritic	72/100
Review scores
Source	Rating
AllMusic	3.5/5 stars
Consequence	C+
Drowned In Sound	6/10
Pitchfork	7.3/10
PopMatters	6/10
Rolling Stone	3.5/5 stars
Spin	7/10

== Track listing ==
No.	Title	Length
1.	"A Sender"	5:36
2.	"Duplex Trip"	4:20
3.	"Blind Babe"	3:44
4.	"Little Fang"	4:12
5.	"Catchy (Was Contagious)"	3:21
6.	"That It Won't Grow"	4:28
7.	"The Outlaw"	5:51
8.	"Roses on the Window"	6:43
9.	"Modern Days E"	3:22
10.	"Strange Colores"	3:00
11.	"Your Card"	5:08
Total length:		49:39

== Personnel ==
Avey Tare's Slasher Flicks

- Angel Deradoorian - Keyboards / backing vocals
- Jeremy Hyman - Drums
- Dave Portner - Guitars / leading vocals
