= Xuman =

Russian pop group

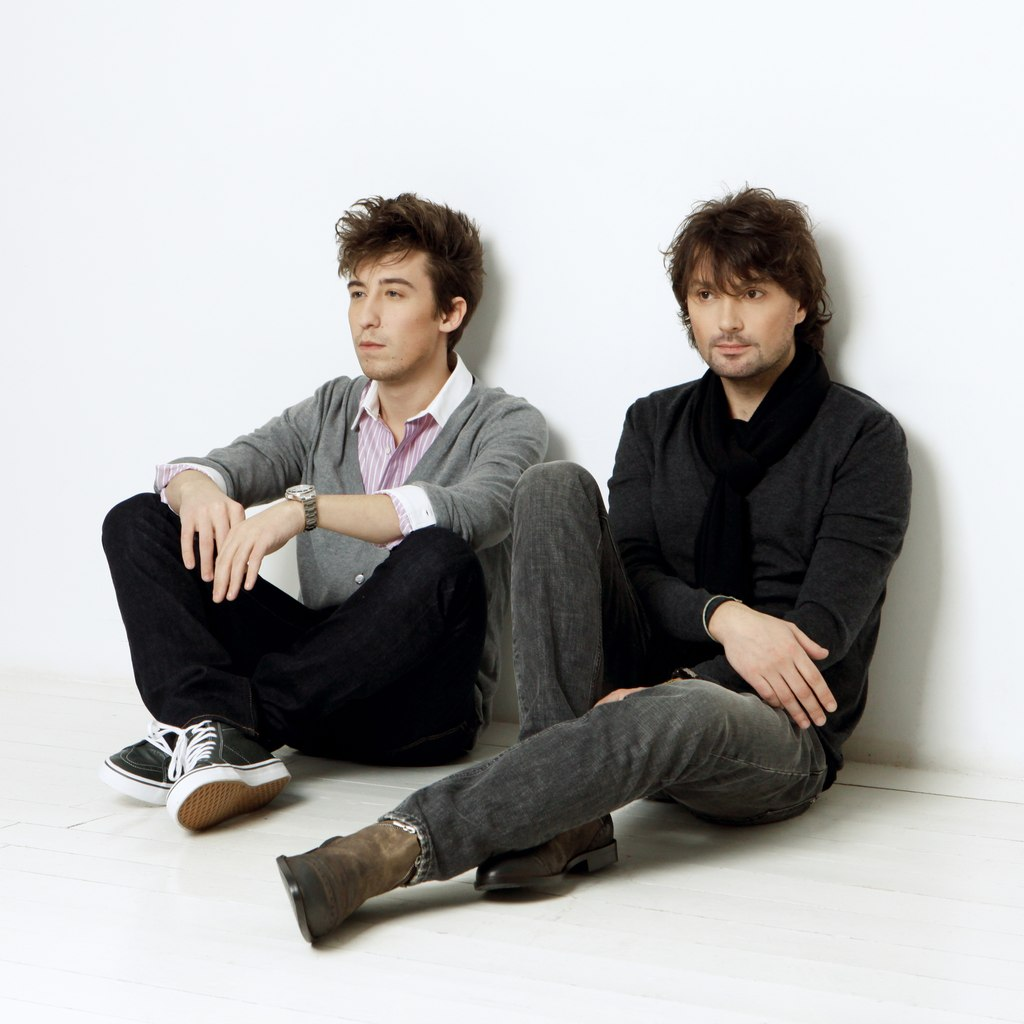
- From left to right: Sasha Xuman and Ilya Sosnitskiy

Background information
- Origin: Moscow, Russia
- Genres: Epic pop, electropop, indie rock
- Years active: 2009–present
- Labels: Xuman Records
- Members: Sasha Xuman; Ilya Sosnitskiy; David Sagamonyants
- Past members: Dmitry Vinnikov
- Website: Xuman Records

Xuman [ˈhju:mən] is an epic pop band from Moscow, Russia founded May 11, 2009, by Sasha Xuman and Ilya Sosnitskiy. Through the band's lifetime their style switched from electropop to indie rock music.

== History ==
Xumans first public appearance was made in December 2009. During 2010 Xuman has been forming its live band and started playing gigs across Russia. When the Golden Age album came out in March 2011, Xuman started its Golden Age tour that ended in October of that same year. In May 2013 they released '49 Nymphomaniacs' EP.

== Members ==
- Sasha Xuman – music, lyrics, vocals, keys
- Ilya Sosnitskiy – music, lyrics, back-vocals, guitars, keys
- David Sagamonyants – drums

== Discography ==
=== Albums ===
- 2011 — Golden Age
- 2013 — 49 Nymphomaniacs (EP)
- 2015 – The Mask Gains Over Man

=== Singles ===
- 2010 – Panic
- 2012 – Play

== Music videos ==
- 2010 — Panic on YouTube
- 2011 — Side by Side on YouTube
- 2012 — Play on YouTube
- 2013 — 49 on YouTube
