= Rebecca Goring =

Australian rules footballer, guitarist and singer-songwriter

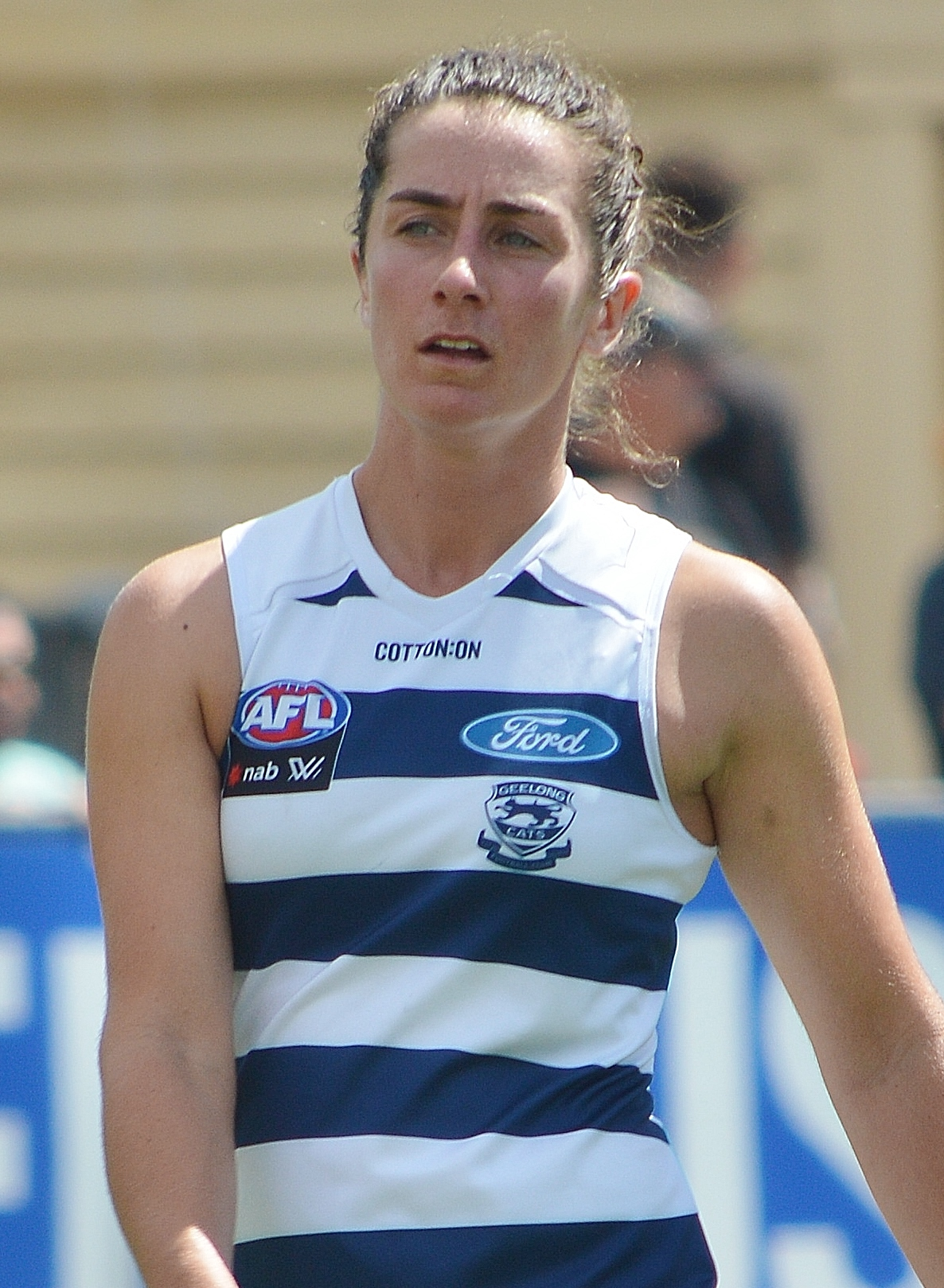
- Goring with Geelong in February 2020

Personal information
- Born: 9 June 1994 (age 32)
- Debut: Round 1, 2019, Geelong vs. Collingwood, at GMHBA Stadium
- Height: 177 cm (5 ft 10 in)
- Position: Defender

Playing career^{1}
Years	Club	Games (Goals)
2019–2021	Geelong	17 (0)
- ^{1} Playing statistics correct to the end of the 2021 season.

Rebecca Goring (born 9 June 1994) is an Australian guitarist, singer-songwriter and Australian rules footballer who played for the Geelong Football Club in the AFL Women's competition (AFLW).

== Personal life ==
Goring grew up in Geelong, Victoria, before graduating from the Melbourne Conservatorium of Music in 2016, having studied jazz and improvisation. Whilst studying, she also played football for Melbourne University Football Club.

== AFL Women's career ==
Goring was signed by Geelong prior to the 2018 AFL Women's draft under the league's expansion club signing rules. She had previously played for and captained Geelong's side in the lower-tier VFL Women's competition in 2017 and 2018. She made her AFLW debut in a one-point win over Collingwood at GMHBA Stadium in the opening match of the 2019 season. As the club's vice-captain, Goring served as captain during that match, in the absence of injured club captain Melissa Hickey. In June 2021, she was delisted by Geelong.

== Music career ==
Goring is a guitarist and singer-songwriter who has performed both as a solo artist and in various bands. Additionally, she is the director of the Sweethearts Junior Academy, a music group based in Geelong for young girls.

Since 2022 Goring has been a member of Heavy Moss, a psych-pop band led by King Gizzard and the Lizard Wizard bassist Lucas Harwood.
