= Lucas Harwood =

Australian bassist

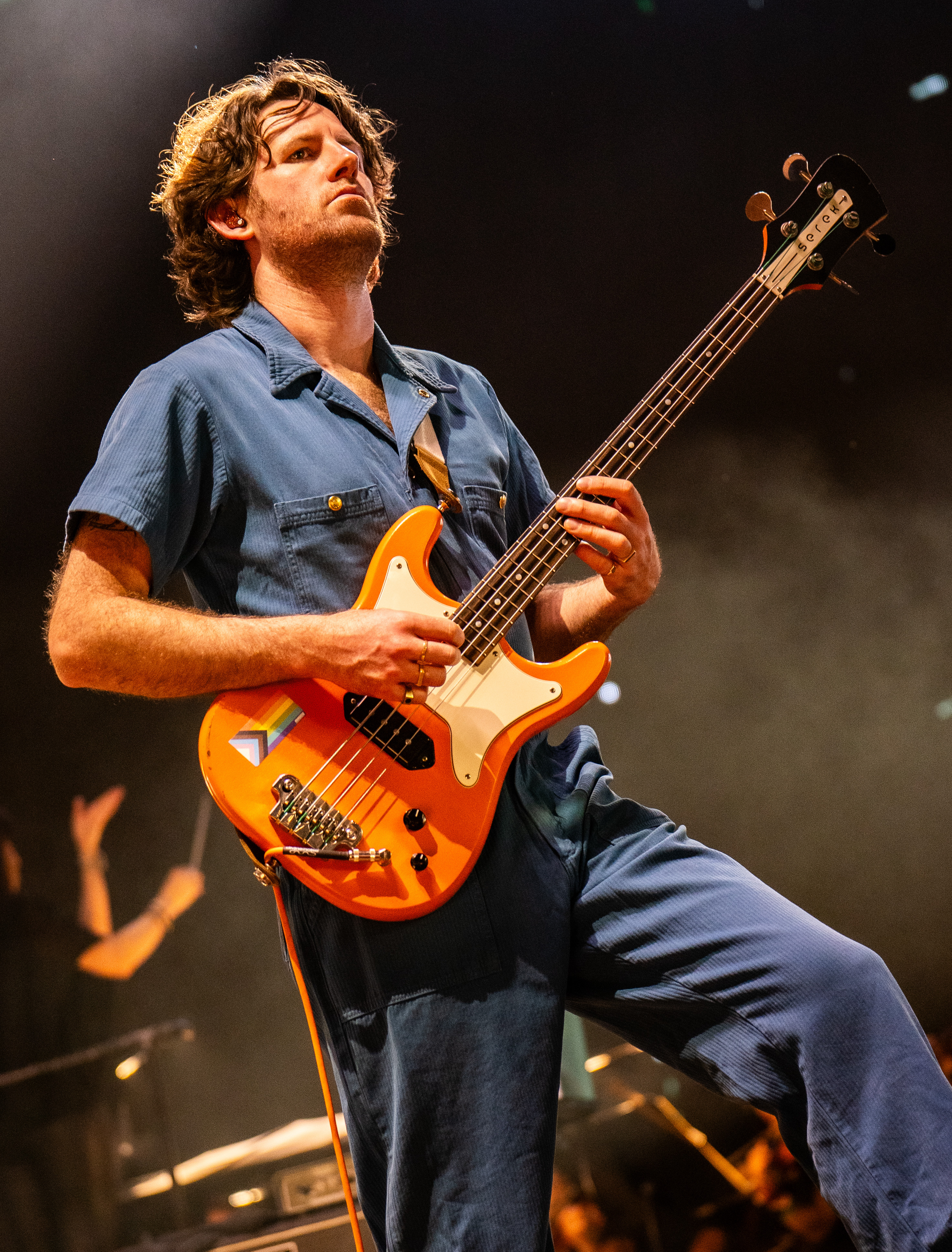
- Harwood performing in 2025

Background information
- Also known as: Lukey
- Born: Lucas Skinner; December 3, 1990 (age 35)
- Occupation: Bassist
- Instruments: Bass guitar; keyboards; guitar; vocals
- Years active: 2005–present
- Member of: King Gizzard and the Lizard Wizard; Heavy Moss
- Formerly of: Atolls
- Spouse: Liza Harwood (m. 2019)

Lucas Graeme Harwood (né Skinner) is an Australian bassist known for his role in King Gizzard and the Lizard Wizard as well as Atolls and Heavy Moss.

== Biography ==
=== Early life ===
Harwood is a native of Geelong, Victoria. When he was a child his parents took him to music festivals such as the Port Fairy Folk Festival and the Queenscliff Music Festival which helped foster his love for music. Harwood had been in a garage band before joining King Gizzard and the Lizard Wizard, and said band kicked out their bassist, with Harwood transitioning from guitar to bass to pick up the slack.

=== King Gizzard and the Lizard Wizard ===
Since 2010 Skinner has been the lead bassist for King Gizzard and the Lizard Wizard. Although not a member of the original trio of Eric Moore, Joey Walker and Stu Mackenzie, Harwood would be with the band in its earliest form, joining as the fourth member as a student project for a RMIT course on Contemporary Music Performance. Harwood said that his favorite part of being in the band is the freedom the band offers to pursue new musical styles. During the development of Flight b741 Harwood stated that it was an intentional decision for the band to lean into 60's and 70's classic rock, as "It’s just you and your instrument. And it’s like, ‘What can I do without all the other bells and whistles that technology affords?’" Harwood also commented that the band was working on another album concurrently with Flight b741. As bassist Harwood uses a EarthQuaker Devices Special Cranker, and a Big Muff. Harwood stated that he liked it when the band tours in smaller cities, as "In places like that, the fans are so pumped and appreciative that you’re coming through their town." During live performances Harwood is placed on a riser alongside Michael Cavanagh.

=== Atolls ===
Skinner founded a band named Atolls in 2011 as a side project between work for King Gizzard and the Lizard Wizard recruiting Oli Grinter and Sam Ingles to record some demos he made that didn't fit with King Gizzard and the Lizard Wizard's tone. The band was noted for its "laidback" and "shoegazey" style and its high use of distortion. After releasing two EPs, Hair Machine in 2013 and New Dreams in 2014, the band fell apart in late 2014. Near the end of the band's existence it was described as "criminally undervalued and perpetually overlooked."

=== Heavy Moss ===
When visiting his home in 2022 between tours for King Gizzard and the Lizard Wizard, Harwood met Ingles again by chance. After reconnecting, the pair formed a new band called Heavy Moss. As the pair were workshopping some demos Harwood made that didn't fit King Gizzard and the Lizard Wizard's style, they also brought on Kyle Tickell and Bec Goring. The first album by Heavy Moss was Dead Slow, released on 22 November 2024 with Harwood and Mackenzie mixing half the album while on tour, while the other half was mixed by Michael Badger, who mixed Nonagon Infinity.

== Personal life ==
In 2019 following his marriage to Liza Harwood, Harwood took his wife's surname, becoming Lucas Harwood. They have two sons together. His oldest son, Ari, helped write a line in the Heavy Moss single "Treadmills".

Lucas Harwood and his family run Dusky Tracks, an independent record label that occasionally collaborates with Gizzard side projects, such as Love Migrate.

Harwood has a brother named Michael who fronted a band called Mallee Songs that collaborated with Stu Mackenzie.
