= World Tour 2024 =

2024 concert tour by King Gizzard & the Lizard Wizard

- World tour by King Gizzard & the Lizard Wizard
- Promotional photo
- Start date: 14 March 2024
- End date: 21 November 2024
- Legs: 4
- No. of shows: 60

King Gizzard & the Lizard Wizard concert chronology
- U.S. Residency Tour (2023); World Tour 2024 (2024); World Tour 2025 (2025)

King Gizzard & the Lizard Wizard's World Tour 2024 was a concert tour of South America, Europe and North America. It began on 14 March 2024, in Santiago, Chile at Teatro Coliseo and concluded on 21 November 2024 at Factory Town near Miami, Florida.

The tour was announced on 7 November 2023, with the marathon sets at Forest Hills Stadium, Huntington Bank Pavilion, The Gorge Amphitheatre and Germania Insurance Amphitheater being announced in advance in September of that year.

== History ==
The tour encompasses a vast array of venues, some being large arenas such as the Kia Forum and the Pacific Coliseum. Frontman Stu Mackenzie has said about the band's increase in popularity:

From where I'm sitting, honestly, it all feels very abstract. It's insanely flattering and humbling and just freaky, but it sometimes feels like it's happening to someone else and I'm just acting this part. Really, I'm extremely grateful, because we get energy from the whole thing. It's like a beautiful spiral of positivity. As long as people are willing to come watch us play, I'm pretty sure we're going to just keep playing.

== Reception ==
Pitchfork put the tour on their list of "The 44 Most Anticipated Tours of 2024".

== Tour dates ==
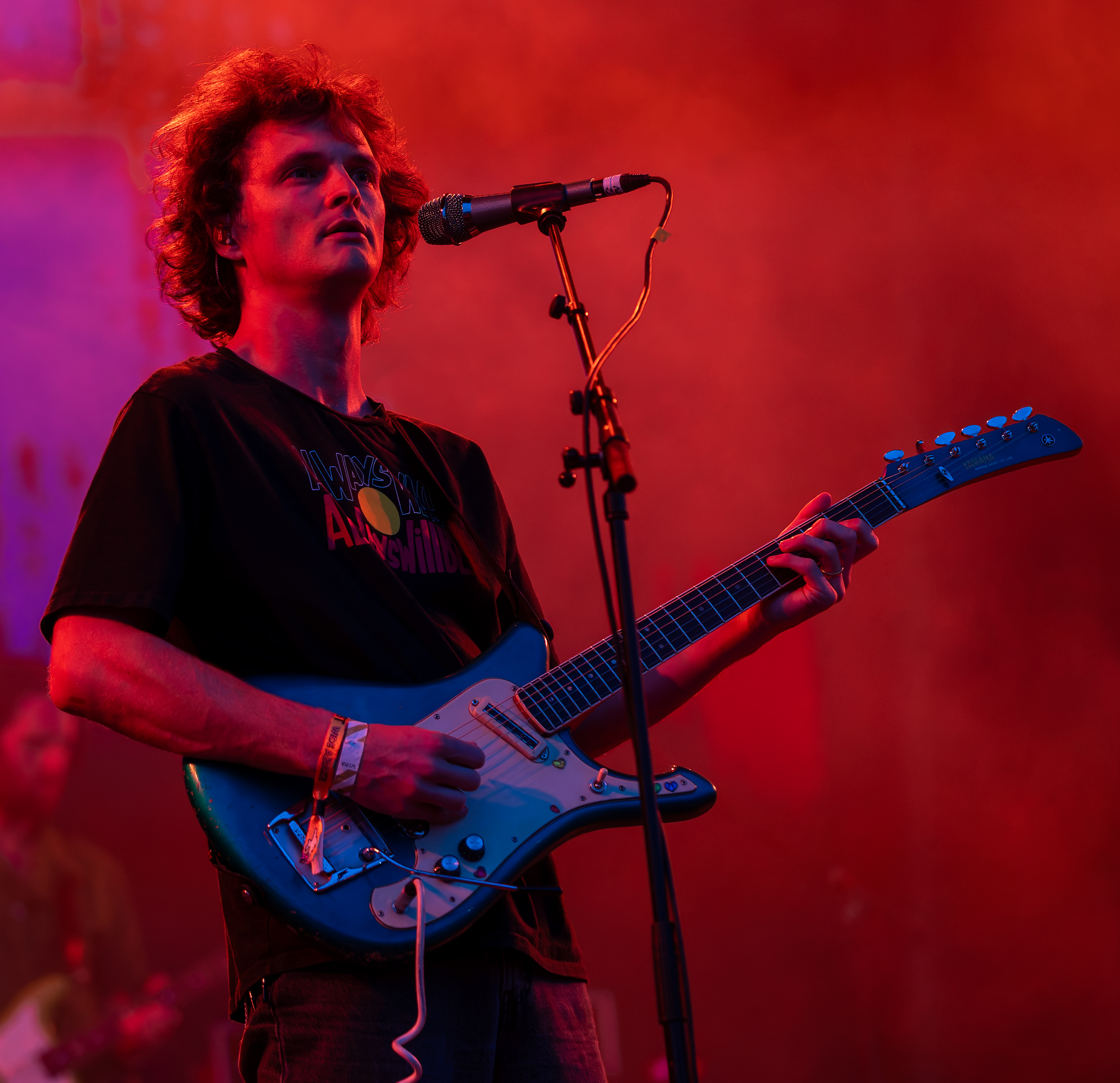
Stu Mackenzie performing with the band at Wide Awake festival in London on the tour.

List of concerts
Date	City	Country	Venue	Opening acts	Notes
South America
March 14, 2024	Santiago	Chile	Teatro Coliseo	—N/a	Lollapalooza sideshow
March 15, 2024 (Note: The show on March 15, 2024, in Santiago at Parque Cerrillos is part of Lollapalooza Chile.)	Santiago	Chile	Parque Cerrillos	—N/a	—N/a
March 17, 2024 (Note: The show on March 17, 2024, in Buenos Aires at Hippodrome San Isidro is part of Lollapalooza Argentina.)	Buenos Aires	Argentina	Hippodrome San Isidro	—N/a	—N/a
March 18, 2024	Buenos Aires	Argentina	Teatro Vorterix	—N/a	Lollapalooza Sideshow
March 21, 2024 (Note: The show on March 21, 2024, in Bogotá at Briceño 18 is part of Festival Estéreo Picnic.)	Bogotá	Colombia	Briceño 18	—N/a	—N/a
March 23, 2024 (Note: The show on March 23, 2024, in São Paulo at Interlagos Racetrack is part of Lollapalooza Brasil.)	São Paulo	Brazil	Interlagos Racetrack	—N/a	—N/a
Europe
May 15, 2024	Brussels	Belgium	Forest National	Grace Cummings	—N/a
May 16, 2024	Offenbach	Germany	Stadthalle	Grace Cummings	—N/a
May 18, 2024	Prague	Czech Republic	Forum Karlín	Grace Cummings	—N/a
May 19, 2024	Vienna	Austria	Arena Wien	Hypnotic Floor (Note: Grace Cummings was originally billed as the support for the entire European leg, but had to cancel a number of shows due to illness.)	—N/a
May 20, 2024	Berlin	Germany	Columbiahalle	Cosey Mueller	—N/a
May 22, 2024	Hamburg	Germany	Stadtpark Open Air	—N/a	3-hour marathon set
May 23, 2024	Amsterdam	Netherlands	AFAS Live	Dr Sure's Unusual Practice	—N/a
May 25, 2024 (Note: The show on May 25, 2024, in London at Brockwell Park is their headlining show at the Wide Awake Festival.)	London	United Kingdom	Brockwell Park	—N/a	—N/a
May 26, 2024	Liverpool	United Kingdom	Liverpool Olympia	Upchuck	—N/a
May 27, 2024	Edinburgh	United Kingdom	The Usher Hall	C.O.F.F.I.N	—N/a
May 29, 2024	Wolverhampton	United Kingdom	The Civic Hall	Grace Cummings	—N/a
May 30, 2024	Bristol	United Kingdom	Bristol Beacon	Grace Cummings	—N/a
May 31, 2024	Brighton	United Kingdom	Brighton Dome	Grace Cummings	Acoustic set
June 2, 2024 (Note: The show on June 2, 2024, in Paris at the Bois de Vincennes is part of We Love Green Festival.)	Paris	France	Bois de Vincennes	Grace Cummings	—N/a
June 4, 2024 (Note: The show on June 4, 2024, in Milan at Circolo Magnolia is part of UNALTROFESTIVAL.)	Milan	Italy	Circolo Magnolia	—N/a	
North America part 1
August 15, 2024	Washington, D.C.	United States	The Anthem	Geese	—N/a
August 16, 2024	Forest Hills	United States	Forest Hills Stadium	Geese	3-hour marathon set
August 17, 2024	Forest Hills	United States	Forest Hills Stadium	Geese	3-hour marathon set
August 19, 2024	Boston	United States	The Stage at Suffolk Downs	Geese	—N/a
August 20, 2024	Portland	United States	Thompson's Point	Geese	—N/a
August 21, 2024	Toronto	Canada	Budweiser Stage	Geese	—N/a
August 23, 2024	Detroit	United States	Aretha Franklin Amphitheatre	Geese	Acoustic set
August 24, 2024	Cleveland	United States	Jacobs Pavilion	Geese	—N/a
August 25, 2024	Newport	United States	Megacorp Pavilion	Geese	—N/a
August 27, 2024	Philadelphia	United States	The Dell Music Center	Geese	—N/a
August 28, 2024	Richmond	United States	Brown's Island	Geese	—N/a
August 30, 2024	Asheville	United States	ExploreAsheville.com Arena	Geese	—N/a
August 31, 2024	Nashville	United States	Ascend Amphitheater	Geese	—N/a
September 1, 2024	Chicago	United States	Huntington Bank Pavilion	Geese	3-hour marathon set
September 3, 2024	Minneapolis	United States	The Armory	Geese	—N/a
September 4, 2024	Milwaukee	United States	Miller High Life Theatre	Geese	—N/a
September 5, 2024	St. Louis	United States	The Factory	Geese	—N/a
September 6, 2024	Omaha	United States	The Astro Amphitheater	Geese	—N/a
September 8, 2024	Morrison	United States	Red Rocks Amphitheatre	Geese	—N/a
September 9, 2024	Morrison	United States	Red Rocks Amphitheatre	Geese	Two shows in one day, one early and one late
September 11, 2024	Troutdale	United States	Edgefield Amphitheater	Geese	—N/a
September 12, 2024	Vancouver	Canada	Pacific Coliseum	Geese	—N/a
September 14, 2024	Quincy	United States	The Gorge Amphitheatre	Geese	3-hour marathon set
North America part 2
November 1, 2024	Inglewood	United States	Kia Forum	King Stingray	3-hour marathon set
November 2, 2024	San Diego	United States	The Rady Shell at Jacobs Park	King Stingray	Acoustic set
November 3, 2024	Paso Robles	United States	Vina Robles Amphitheatre	King Stingray	—N/a
November 4, 2024	Stanford	United States	Frost Amphitheater	King Stingray	—N/a
November 6, 2024	San Francisco	United States	Regency Ballroom	Bullant	Experimental rave set, announced between legs
November 8, 2024	Las Vegas	United States	PH Live	King Stingray	—N/a
November 9, 2024	Phoenix	United States	Arizona Financial Theatre	King Stingray	—N/a
November 10, 2024	Albuquerque	United States	Revel Entertainment Center	King Stingray	—N/a
November 12, 2024	Oklahoma City	United States	The Criterion	King Stingray	—N/a
November 13, 2024	Fayetteville	United States	JJ's Live	King Stingray	—N/a
November 15, 2024	Austin	United States	Germania Insurance Amphitheater	King Stingray	3-hour marathon set
November 16, 2024	Houston	United States	White Oak Music Hall	King Stingray	—N/a
November 17, 2024	New Orleans	United States	Mardi Gras World	King Stingray	—N/a
November 19, 2024	Atlanta	United States	Fox Theatre Atlanta	King Stingray	—N/a
November 20, 2024	St. Augustine	United States	St. Augustine Amphitheatre	King Stingray	—N/a
November 21, 2024	Hialeah (Note: Listed as Miami on all tour documents)	United States	Factory Town	King Stingray	—N/a
