= The Painters =

EP by Animal Collective
- Released: February 17, 2017
- Genre: Synth-pop
- Length: 13:25
- Label: Domino
- Producer: Animal Collective

Animal Collective chronology
Painting With (2016)	The Painters (2017)	Meeting of the Waters (2017)

The Painters is the eighth EP by American experimental pop band Animal Collective, released on February 17, 2017. It is the first extended play released by the band since Monkey Been to Burn Town (2013). The EP serves as a companion to their 2016 studio album, Painting With.

== Musical style ==
The Painters continues in the "synth-splattering" pop aesthetic of its polarizing predecessor Painting With.

The first track, "Kinda Bonkers", has been compared to its predecessor's opener "FloriDada". It has been noted for donning a "tribal pulse", musically and lyrically resulting in a piece of "outreach raga-rock."

== Critical reception ==
Professional ratings
Review scores
Source	Rating
Exclaim!	7/10
God Is in the TV	5/10
The Independent	4/5 stars
Pitchfork	6.1/10
Sputnikmusic	3.0/5

The Independent rated the album 4 stars, calling it "possibly the perfect Animal Collective release".

== Track listing ==
All tracks are written by Animal Collective except "Jimmy Mack", by Holland–Dozier–Holland.

No.	Title	Length
1.	"Kinda Bonkers"	3:14
2.	"Peacemaker"	3:16
3.	"Goalkeeper"	2:48
4.	"Jimmy Mack"	4:07
Total length:		13:25
