= Crosswords (EP) =

EP by Panda Bear
- Released: August 20, 2015
- Recorded: 2013–2014
- Studios: Miosotis Garage (Almada, Portugal); Estudio Namouche (Lisbon, Portugal)
- Length: 21:03
- Label: Domino
- Producers: Panda Bear; Sonic Boom

Panda Bear chronology
Panda Bear Meets the Grim Reaper (2015)	Crosswords (2015)	A Day with the Homies (2018)

Crosswords is the second EP by American recording artist Panda Bear. It was released on August 20, 2015 by the Domino Recording Company. This release features an updated audio mix of the track "Crosswords" from the version on his fifth studio album Panda Bear Meets the Grim Reaper. The other 4 tracks on the release were not included on Panda Bear Meets the Grim Reaper, however, an earlier version of "The Preakness" appears on Animal Collective's 2011 EP Keep + Animal Collective and the deluxe edition of Panda Bear album Tomboy.

== Track listing ==
No.	Title	Length
1.	"Crosswords" (EP Mix)	3:36
2.	"No Mans Land"	3:46
3.	"Jabberwocky"	4:45
4.	"The Preakness"	4:11
5.	"Cosplay"	4:45
Total length:		21:03
