= Reset (Panda Bear and Sonic Boom album) =

2022 album by Panda Bear and Sonic Boom

Studio album by Panda Bear and Sonic Boom
- Released: August 12, 2022
- Recorded: 2020–2021
- Studios: New Atlantis (Sintra); Campo (Lisbon); Black Sheep (Sintra)
- Length: 38:28
- Label: Domino
- Producers: Panda Bear; Sonic Boom

Panda Bear chronology
Buoys (2019)	Reset (2022)	Reset in Dub (2023)

Sonic Boom chronology
All Things Being Equal (2020)	Reset (2022)	Reset in Dub (2023)

Singles from Reset
- 1. "Go On" Released: July 13, 2022; 2. "Edge of the Edge" Released: August 3, 2022

Reset is a collaborative studio album by Panda Bear and Sonic Boom (the respective stage names of Noah Lennox and Peter Kember), released on August 12, 2022 through Domino. It marks the duo's first collaborative album; Kember had previously co-produced Lennox's Tomboy (2011) and Panda Bear Meets the Grim Reaper (2015).

== Composition ==
Much of the album is built on a bedrock of sampled loops taken from the intros of various 1950s and 1960s pop songs, with Panda Bear and Sonic Boom sharing vocal duties on top of these.

== Release ==
The album was released on August 12, 2022, through Domino Recording Company.

== Reception ==
Professional ratings
Aggregate scores
Source	Rating
AnyDecentMusic?	7.6/10
Metacritic	82/100
Review scores
Source	Rating
AllMusic	4.5/5 stars
Beats Per Minute	71%
The Daily Telegraph	5/5 stars
DIY	3.5/5 stars
Mojo	4/5 stars
Paste	7.3/10
Pitchfork	8.0/10
Record Collector	5/5 stars
Slant Magazine	2.5/5 stars
Uncut	9/10

According to the review aggregator Metacritic, Reset received "universal acclaim" based on a weighted average score of 82 out of 100 from 17 critic scores.

In a positive review for Pitchfork, Daniel Felsenthal wrote that the album was "the most pleasurable release" of both Lennox and Kember's career. He added, "Less palliative than corrective, Reset is a dose of human lightness in the drudgery of the now." Writing for AllMusic, Fred Thomas noted that "There's a sense that the heightened collaborative element takes the pressure off of both artists, and the songs sound like two old friends joyfully exchanging ideas and toying with the possibilities of their sound." In a mixed review, Thomas Bedenbaugh of Slant Magazine opined that the album "revels in the whimsical sounds of '50s and '60s pop and rock but lacks the memorable songwriting that made much of the best music from that era so indelible."

== Reset in Dub ==
Reset in Dub

Remix album by Panda Bear, Sonic Boom, and Adrian Sherwood
- Released: August 18, 2023
- Genre: Dub
- Label: Domino
- Producer: Adrian Sherwood

Panda Bear and Sonic Boom chronology
Reset (2022)	Reset in Dub (2023)	Sinister Grift (2025)

Adrian Sherwood chronology
Lucifer on the Moon (2022)	Reset in Dub (2023)

Singles from Reset in Dub
- 1. "Whirlpool Dub (Adrian Sherwood Reset in Dub Remix)" Released: July 13, 2023

On July 13, 2023, the duo announced a dub rework of the album called Reset in Dub, helmed by British dub producer Adrian Sherwood. The album was released digitally on August 18 by Domino, and on vinyl on December 8. The first single, "Whirlpool Dub (Adrian Sherwood Reset in Dub Remix)", was released the same day as the announcement.

== Track listing ==
Reset – Standard edition
No.	Title	Writer(s)	Length
1.	"Gettin' to the Point"	Peter Kember; Noah Lennox; Bob Cochran^{[a]}; Eddie Cochran^{[a]}	2:30
2.	"Go On"	Kember; Lennox; Reg Presley^{[b]}	4:47
3.	"Everyday"	Kember; Lennox	3:52
4.	"Edge of the Edge"	Kember; Lennox; Neil Mel Levenson^{[c]}	4:49
5.	"In My Body"	Kember; Lennox	3:51
6.	"Whirlpool"	Kember; Lennox	5:01
7.	"Danger"	Kember; Lennox; Boudleaux Bryant^{[d]}	5:38
8.	"Livin' in the After"	Kember; Lennox; Doc Pomus^{[e]}; Mort Shuman^{[e]}	2:54
9.	"Everything's Been Leading to This"	Kember; Lennox	5:09
Total length:			38:31

Reset – Expanded edition
No.	Title	Writer(s)	Length
12.	"Gettin' to the Point" (Songbook Instrumental)	Kember; Lennox; B. Cochran^{[a]}; E. Cochran^{[a]}	2:30
13.	"Go On" (Songbook Instrumental)	Kember; Lennox; Reg Presley^{[b]}	4:47
14.	"Everyday" (Songbook Instrumental)	Kember; Lennox	3:54
15.	"Edge of the Edge" (Songbook Instrumental)	Kember; Lennox; Neil Mel Levenson^{[c]}	4:48
16.	"In My Body" (Songbook Instrumental)	Kember; Lennox	3:51
17.	"Whirlpool" (Songbook Instrumental)	Kember; Lennox	5:02
18.	"Danger" (Songbook Instrumental)	Kember; Lennox; Boudleaux Bryant^{[d]}	5:40
19.	"Livin' in the After" (Songbook Instrumental)	Kember; Lennox; Doc Pomus^{[e]}; Mort Shuman^{[e]}	2:57
20.	"Everything's Been Leading to This" (Songbook Instrumental)	Kember; Lennox	5:07
21.	"Gettin' to the Point" (David Holmes Remix)	Kember; Lennox; B. Cochran^{[a]}; E. Cochran^{[a]}	5:37
22.	"Edge of the Edge" (Voka Gentle Remix)	Kember; Lennox; Neil Mel Levenson^{[c]}	6:28
23.	"Everything's Been Leading Up to This" (Voka Gentle Remix)	Kember; Lennox	6:04
Total length:			65:16

Notes

- ^{^[a]} "Gettin' to the Point" contains samples of "Three Steps to Heaven", written by Bob Cochran and Eddie Cochran, and performed by Eddie Cochran.
- ^{^[b]} "Go On" contains samples of "Give It to Me", written by Reg Presley and performed by the Troggs.
- ^{^[c]} "Edge of the Edge" contains samples of "Denise" written by Neil Mel Levenson and performed by Randy & the Rainbows.
- ^{^[d]} "Danger" contains a sample of "Love of My Life" written by Boudleaux Bryant and performed by the Everly Brothers.
- ^{^[e]} "Livin' in the After" contains samples of "Save the Last Dance for Me", written by Doc Pomus and Mort Shuman, and performed by the Drifters.

== Personnel ==
- Panda Bear – vocals, percussion, bass guitar, Arturia MicroFreak, acoustic guitar, Vox Starstream guitar, production, recording, mixing
- Sonic Boom – vocals, loops, percussion, effects, Yamaha PSS-480, Eventide H910 Harmonizer, Teenage Engineering OP-1, production, recording, mixing
- Paul Mac – mastering
- Guilherme Gonçalves – recording
- Marco Papiro – artwork

== Charts ==
Chart performance for Reset
Chart (2022)	Peak position
Scottish Albums (Official Charts)	34
Swiss Albums (Schweizer Hitparade)	92
UK Album Downloads (Official Charts)	32
UK Independent Albums (Official Charts)	14

Chart performance for Reset in Dub
Chart (2023)	Peak position
UK Album Downloads (Official Charts)	40
