= Lemon Glow =

Single by Beach House

from the album 7
- Released: February 15, 2018
- Recorded: 2017
- Studio: Apple Orchard (Baltimore, Maryland); Carriage House (Stamford, Connecticut)
- Genre: Dream pop
- Length: 4:04
- Label: Sub Pop
- Songwriter: Beach House
- Producers: Beach House; Sonic Boom

Beach House singles chronology
"Chariot" (2017)	"Lemon Glow" (2018)	"Dive" (2018)

Visualizer
- "Lemon Glow" on YouTube

"Lemon Glow" is a song by American dream pop band Beach House. It was released on February 15, 2018, through Sub Pop, as the lead single from their album 7 (2018). Accompanied with a visualizer, it was received positively by several publications, with several of them calling it the band's "most danceable track to date".

== Background ==
Following the release of their compilation album B-Sides and Rarities (2017), the band announced the release of "Lemon Glow" on Instagram on February 15, 2018. Accompanied with a caption read on the Instagram post as "Wishing everyone out there love tonight", the band stated that it would appear on their then-untitled seventh studio album, serving as its lead single. An accompanying visualizer, in which Salvatore Maicki of The Fader described as a "groovy checkered visual", was released on the same day.

== Composition ==
"Lemon Glow" contains a "metallic [and] strobing synth line" that is heard throughout the song. It also uses additional synthesizers and drum machines, with the song ending abruptly. While being asked by Pitchfork about the beat running throughout the song, guitarist Alex Scally stated that it's a "shitty ’90s drum machine that we found in L.A. in like 2012", with a demo of the beat being titled "dyslexia".

== Critical reception ==
The song received positive reviews from critics. Upon release, several publications considered "Lemon Glow" to be Beach House's "most danceable track to date", including The Fader, NME, and Spin. Named as "Best New Track", Shaad D'Souza from Pitchfork described "Lemon Glow" as a "new direction for [Beach House], with subtle changes to their distinct sound that signal a sharpening of the band’s typically soft edges." Lauren O'Neill from Vice considered that it is "a little more foreboding than [they're] used to from [Beach House]" but stated that it is "a great new twist on their sound".

"Lemon Glow" was named as the 10th best track of the first-half of 2018 by Cosmopolitan, who referred it as "woozy".

== Personnel ==
Credits adapted from the liner notes of 7.

Beach House

- Victoria Legrand
- Alex Scally

Additional

- James Barone – live drums, engineering
- Sonic Boom – drill, production
- Mikhail Pivovarov – engineering
- David Tolemei – engineering, additional editing and recording
- Alan Moulder – mixing
- Caesar Edmunds – engineering
- Greg Calbi – mastering

== Charts ==
Chart performance for "Lemon Glow"
Chart (2018)	Peak position
Mexico Ingles Airplay (Billboard)	47
