= Time Skiffs =

Studio album by Animal Collective
- Released: February 4, 2022
- Recorded: 2020
- Studios: Namouche Studios (Lisbon); Drop of Sun (Asheville, North Carolina)
- Genres: Indie pop; neo-psychedelia
- Length: 47:01
- Label: Domino

Animal Collective chronology
Bridge to Quiet (2020)	Time Skiffs (2022)	Isn't It Now? (2023)

Singles from Time Skiffs
- 1. "Prester John" Released: October 20, 2021; 2. "Walker" Released: December 13, 2021; 3. "Strung with Everything" Released: January 19, 2022; 4. "We Go Back" Released: February 1, 2022

Time Skiffs is the eleventh studio album by American experimental pop band Animal Collective, released on February 4, 2022, on Domino. It is their first album in six years (the groups longest gap between official studio albums to date) and marks the return of band member Deakin, who sat out of the recording and touring of the band's previous album, Painting With (2016). Time Skiffs was preceded by four singles: "Prester John", "Walker", "Strung with Everything", and "We Go Back".

== Background and recording ==
In late 2017, after wrapping up touring for Painting With (2016), the band was offered to play a show in at New Orleans' Music Box Village, an interactive arts venue. Noah Lennox (Panda Bear), who was busy at the time in Europe, was unable to attend, so David Portner (Avey Tare), Brian Weitz (Geologist), and Josh Dibb (Deakin) prepared material for the upcoming performance. The two-night installation, which took place on March 16–17, 2018, included early versions of the songs "Prester John" and "Royal and Desire".

In summer 2019, all four band members rented a house together in Leiper's Fork, Tennessee to develop material for a forthcoming record. It was here that they workshopped songs for nearly a month, eventually writing upwards of 20 tracks. On a subsequent tour, in October 2019, they debuted 13 new songs in total, including 8 that would end up on Time Skiffs. After the fall tour, the group prepared to enter the studio in March 2020. However, the COVID-19 pandemic put a halt to these plans, and the band was forced to push back their recording sessions. None of the members were living near each other, and Weitz and Lennox had family responsibilities which preoccupied them. As they waited, all four members worked remotely on the EP Bridge to Quiet (2020), which was released in July of that year.

After being content with how the EP came out, the band, at the persistence of their manager, began to remotely record what would become Time Skiffs at their individual home studios, spanning August 2020 through the fall. The recording process was not without its hiccups, as half of the 2019 songs were set aside for later recording, since they relied more on a live performance dynamic. The songs ultimately chosen for Time Skiffs were more easily able to be recorded to a click track, making remote recording possible.

Still hesitant about the remote recording process, the band remained unconvinced of their progress until Panda Bear entered a professional studio to re-record drums for the first single "Prester John". Deakin said, "That was kind of another big moment too, once we went and did that and, and re-tracked those drums and brought them in, then things start to feel really, really solid. "Prester John" was probably the first one that felt like it was really coming together, sonically, in a way that we all felt like was special enough to justify the [remote recording] process".

The band continued to record Time Skiffs, incorporating several instruments that they had rarely used before, including Weitz playing the hurdy-gurdy and the taishōgoto. The isolation of the pandemic slowed down the recording process, with the band spending weeks mulling over decisions through e-mail and texts that normally would take seconds in the studio. Time Skiffs was mixed by Marta Salogni and mastered by Heba Kadry.

== Music ==
Domino's press release compared the album's sound to the band's seventh album Strawberry Jam as well as their "inchoate early days". Domino called the songs "love letters, distress signals, en plein air observations, and relaxation hymns, the collected transmissions of four people who have grown into relationships and parenthood and adult worry ... rendered with Animal Collective's singular sense of exploratory wonder".

"Prester John" was the result of two songs, one written by Avey Tare and the other by Panda Bear, interwoven together. Ostensibly named after the medieval figure Prester John, the song features "rich vocal harmonies" accompanied by a deep bass groove and "twinkling and atmospheric" synths throughout, ending in an ambient sound collage. "Walker," written primarily by Panda Bear, is a tribute to Scott Walker, who died in 2019, around the time of the song's conception. "Strung with Everything" runs nearly seven minutes; Stereogum called it "as woozy and splashy as you'd expect from Animal Collective, but the melody is fairly sharp and straightforward, and it's got a bit of a playful Paul Simon thing going on".

== Release ==
Time Skiffs was released on February 4, 2022, on Domino Records. Animal Collective teased the album though cryptic photos sent as private messages to fans of the band on Instagram, Reddit, and Discord. Put together, those images form the back cover of the album, complete with track listing and Domino logo. On October 20, the album was formally announced by the band and the label, along with the release of lead single "Prester John" and its music video. The band will support the album with a North American tour scheduled for March 2022. A second single, "Walker", was released on December 13, 2021. A third single, "Strung with Everything", was released on January 19, 2022. A fourth single, "We Go Back", was released on February 1, 2022.

== Critical reception ==
Professional ratings
Aggregate scores
Source	Rating
AnyDecentMusic?	7.4/10
Metacritic	76/100
Review scores
Source	Rating
AllMusic	4/5 stars
The A.V. Club	B
Entertainment Weekly	B+
The Guardian	3/5 stars
The Independent	5/5 stars
Mojo	4/5 stars
NME	4/5 stars
Pitchfork	8.4/10
Rolling Stone	3/5 stars
Uncut	8/10

Time Skiffs was released to positive reviews from contemporary music critics. At Metacritic, which assigns a normalized rating out of 100 to reviews from mainstream critics, the album received an average score of 76, based on 25 reviews, which indicates "generally favorable reviews". Aggregator AnyDecentMusic? gave it 7.4 out of 10, based on their assessment of the critical consensus.

In the review for AllMusic, Tim Sendra claimed that "Instead of regressing or stepping away from the edge when their sound grew too unhinged, the band continues to evolve in unforecastable directions on Time Skiffs. It's an especially lucid reading of the sound they've been perfecting for over two decades at this point, and one that adds a human warmth to a group that's long been defined by their otherworldly nature." Daniel Dylan Wray of Uncut gave Time Skiffs a positive review, writing that the album possesses a "cohesive assuredness" that previous Centipede Hz and Painting With lacked. He especially praised "Prester John" as a "breezy yet irresistible piece of pop-art" reminiscent of Brian Eno's output around the time of Another Green World's release. Of the album, Mojo's Stevie Chick wrote that the band's avant-garde leanings work "in service of songs that still play profoundly with structure but are, perhaps unexpectedly, coherent and melodically focused".

Antonio Poscic of The Wire was mixed in his assessment. He wrote that "while 2016's Painting With was a jumble of interesting ideas lacking direction", Time Skiffs is "a paint-by-numbers indie pop affair". He enjoyed the opening track "Dragon Slayer", calling it a "dangerously concentrated dose of nostalgia". Alexis Petridis from The Guardian was also reserved in giving his praise for the album, stating that "Time Skiffs isn't a straightforward album by most artists' standards: that its patchworks of sound, lengthy instrumental interludes and slowly uncoiling song structures represent Animal Collective dialling things down says more about their past oeuvre than anything else. As it is, it feels like an act of quiet consolidation rather than a breakthrough, aimed squarely at existing fans, unbothered by grabbing anyone else's attention." Meanwhile, Nadia Younes from The Skinny felt let down by the level of creativity offered by the album: "For a band renowned for their experimentation it doesn't feel like much new ground is covered on Time Skiffs and even after years of waiting, by the end of the album you're left wanting more."

== Track listing ==
All tracks are written by Animal Collective, except where noted.

Time Skiffs track listing
No.	Title	Lead vocals	Length
1.	"Dragon Slayer"	Avey Tare	3:56
2.	"Car Keys"	Panda Bear/Avey Tare	4:36
3.	"Prester John"	Panda Bear/Deakin/Avey Tare	6:29
4.	"Strung with Everything"	Avey Tare	6:56
5.	"Walker"	Panda Bear	3:47
6.	"Cherokee" (Animal Collective, Harry Owens)	Avey Tare	7:50
7.	"Passer-By"	Avey Tare	4:18
8.	"We Go Back"	Avey Tare	3:23
9.	"Royal and Desire"	Deakin	5:46
Total length:			47:01

Japanese edition (bonus track)
No.	Title	Length
10.	"Car Keys" (Live September 8, 2021 Lexington, KY)	7:00
Total length:		54:10

- "Cherokee" contains a sample of "To You, Sweetheart, Aloha", as performed by Alfred Apaka & his Hawaiians, written by Harry Owens.

== Personnel ==
Credits adapted from the press kit for the album.

Animal Collective

- Avey Tare – vocals (all tracks), bass guitar (1–4, 6–8), autoharp (1), electric guitar (1, 2, 6, 9), Elektron synthesizer (2, 3, 6, 7, 9), Moog synthesizer (2), percussion (2), pedal steel guitar (4), wooden xylophone (5, 7), Waldorf Pulse synthesizer (5, 6), melodica (6), samples (6), fretless banjo (6), recorder (9)
- Deakin – Nord synthesizer (1–4, 6–9), vocals (1, 3–9), acoustic guitar (4), electric guitar (4), piano (4, 9), bass guitar (5)
- Geologist – Eurorack synthesizer (all tracks), Iris synthesizer (1–7, 9), samples (1–6, 9), Nord synthesizer (1, 4), lap steel guitar (1), Moog synthesizer (2, 7, 8), hurdy-gurdy (2, 3, 5–8), gong (2, 4, 6), field recordings (3, 7), taishōgoto (6, 7, 8)
- Panda Bear – drums (all tracks), vocals (all tracks), samples (4, 6)

Technical

- Animal Collective – recording
- Joaquim Monte – drum recording
- Bernardo Centeno – assistant drum recording
- Marta Salogni – mixing
- Heba Kadry – mastering

Artwork and design

- Avey Tare – collages
- Rob Carmichael (SEEN) – design

== Charts ==
Chart performance for Time Skiffs
Chart (2022)	Peak position
Portuguese Albums (AFP)	31
Scottish Albums (Official Charts)	42
UK Independent Albums (Official Charts)	11
US Billboard 200	152
US Independent Albums (Billboard)	24
US Top Alternative Albums (Billboard)	19
US Top Rock Albums (Billboard)	26
