= A Day with the Homies =

EP by Panda Bear
- Released: January 12, 2018
- Recorded: 2017
- Length: 28:50
- Label: Domino
- Producer: Panda Bear

Panda Bear chronology
Crosswords (2015)	A Day with the Homies (2018)	Buoys (2019)

A Day with the Homies is the third EP by American recording artist Panda Bear (Noah Lennox), released on January 12, 2018 by the Domino Recording Company. It was released only on vinyl, and then to streaming services with a new digital mix on October 31, 2019. Lennox played four of the five tracks live for the first time at the Desert Daze festival in Joshua Tree, California.

== Track listing ==
No.	Title	Length
1.	"Flight"	5:55
2.	"Part of the Math"	7:10
3.	"Shepard Tone"	5:15
4.	"Nod to the Folks"	5:45
5.	"Sunset"	4:45
Total length:		28:50

== Personnel ==
Credits adapted from the liner notes of A Day with the Homies.

- Noah Lennox – producer, mixer, artwork
- Chris Athens – mastering
- Rob Carmichael – artwork
