= 7 (Beach House album) =

Studio album by Beach House
- Released: May 11, 2018
- Recorded: 2017
- Studios: Apple Orchard (Baltimore, Maryland); Carriage House (Stamford, Connecticut); Palmetto, Los Angeles (Note: "Lose Your Smile" and "Woo"); Crown Lanes, Denver (Note: Drums on "Dive")
- Genres: Dream pop; shoegaze; psychedelic pop
- Length: 47:04
- Labels: Sub Pop; Bella Union
- Producers: Beach House; Sonic Boom

Beach House chronology
B-Sides and Rarities (2017)	7 (2018)	Once Twice Melody (2022)

Singles from 7
- 1. "Lemon Glow" Released: February 15, 2018; 2. "Dive" Released: March 7, 2018; 3. "Dark Spring" Released: April 2, 2018; 4. "Black Car" Released: May 2, 2018; 5. "Drunk in LA" Released: September 10, 2018; 6. "Lose Your Smile" Released: October 23, 2018

7 is the seventh studio album by American dream pop duo Beach House, released on May 11, 2018, through Sub Pop and Bella Union. It follows the B-Sides and Rarities compilation album released in 2017, which allowed them "clean out the closet" to pave the way for a new creative process.

The album saw the group departing from longtime producer Chris Coady and instead collaborating with Sonic Boom, whilst not having a producer "in the traditional sense". The recording of the album lasted over eleven months, as opposed to the speedy process of previous efforts, beginning in the duo's home studio in Baltimore and finishing at Carriage House and Palmetto Studio. 7 received acclaim from music critics, who praised the adventurous nature of the record and the consistency of the band, with some calling it the duo's best album to date.

To support the album, the duo released its four pre-release singles—"Lemon Glow", "Dive", "Dark Spring" and "Black Car"—which were released from February to May 2018. "Lose Your Smile" was later released as a physical single, with outtake "Alien" as its B-side. They also released an accompanying album visualizer.

== Background ==
In 2015, Beach House released their fifth studio album Depression Cherry, which marked the band's return to simpler arrangements and minimalist production. The album debuted at number eight on the US Billboard 200, selling 27,000 copies in its first week, becoming their second top-10 entry on the chart. On October 7, 2015, about two months after its release, they announced their sixth studio album Thank Your Lucky Stars, which was stated to be a follow-up, but not a companion, to Depression Cherry or a "surprise or B-sides".

In January 2017, the band announced that they were preparing a compilation album consisting of B-sides and rare tracks. This idea came when the band had realized the amount of non-album songs that were made over the years of their career, and how hard it was to find and hear many of them. The compilation album, which was titled B-Sides and Rarities and was released on June 30, 2017, allowed them to "clean out the closet" to pave the way for a new creative process. While touring throughout 2017, guitarist Alex Scally stated that they were steadily developing new material.

== Recording and production ==
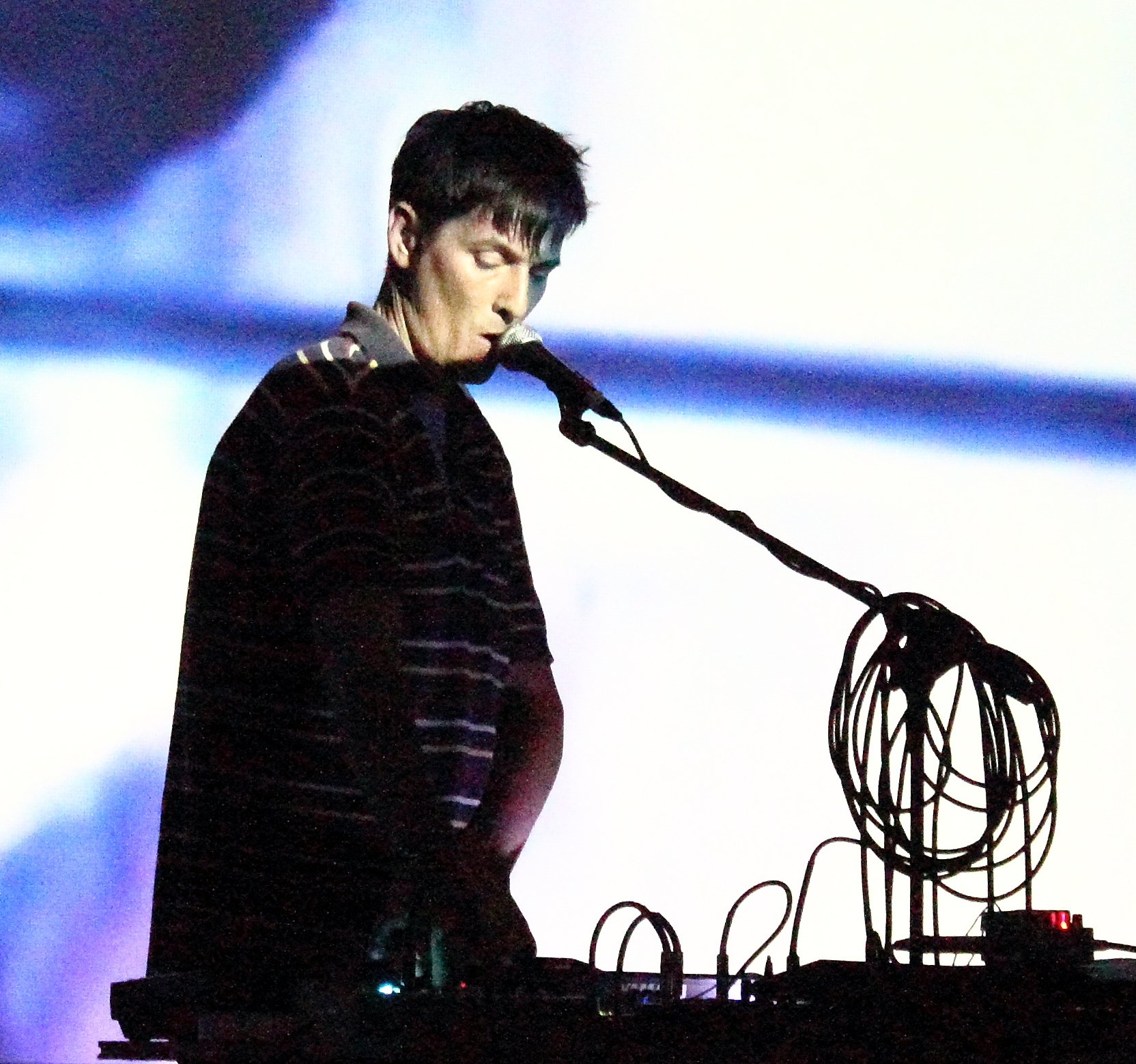
To speed up the recording process for 7, the duo enlisted English record producer Peter Kember (pictured in 2013) as a co-producer.

For 7, the band wanted to reassess their old methods, where they often limited their writing to structures and arrangements that they were able to perform live, and eventually decided to follow what came naturally, adding that they let their creative spirits, instead of instrumentation, to determine the album's feeling. After working with each other on four studio albums, the duo dismissed producer Chris Coady and insisted that they could handle the work themselves.

To record the album, they had several mini-sessions at the duo's home recording studio in Baltimore, Apple Orchard Studios, which was now reworked and expanded from its status of being a practice space. Their recording sessions at their home studio produced only five songs. To speed up this process, the duo hired Peter Kember (Sonic Boom) to help produce the album. "Lose Your Smile" and "Woo" were recorded at Palmetto Studio in Los Angeles. James Barone, who has been the duo's touring drummer since 2016, contributed to the album with live drums, with Alan Moulder mixing the entire album. They also recorded the album at Carriage House in Stamford, Connecticut. In October 2017, they finished writing and recording "Dive" in Baltimore, being the final complete track for the album. They finished development for the album in December 2017.

== Music and themes ==
7 has been primarily described as a dream pop album, with musical influences of shoegaze and psychedelic pop. The band cited the "societal insanity" during 2016 and 2017 as a deep influence on the creation of the record, elaborating: "there is quite a bit of chaos happening in these songs, and a pervasive dark field that we had little control over. The discussions surrounding women's issues were a constant source of inspiration and questioning. The energy, lyrics and moods of much of this record grew from ruminations on the roles, pressures and conditions that our society places on women, past and present. The twisted double edge of glamour, with its perils and perfect moments, was an endless source." Thematically, 7 often deals with "the beauty that arises in dealing with darkness; the empathy and love that grows from collective trauma; the place one reaches when they accept rather than deny."

Legrand described the album's sound as a natural progression and a product of her maturing as an artist, saying, "There were a lot of new and different things that went into making this record. But I think that the way that we wrote, and how we recorded while we wrote, really increased the speed of capturing ideas and gave us a lot more freedom than previous records... I think every time you do something, you become more adept at it. You sort of know better and don't get fooled the same way you got fooled when you were younger."

== Release and promotion ==
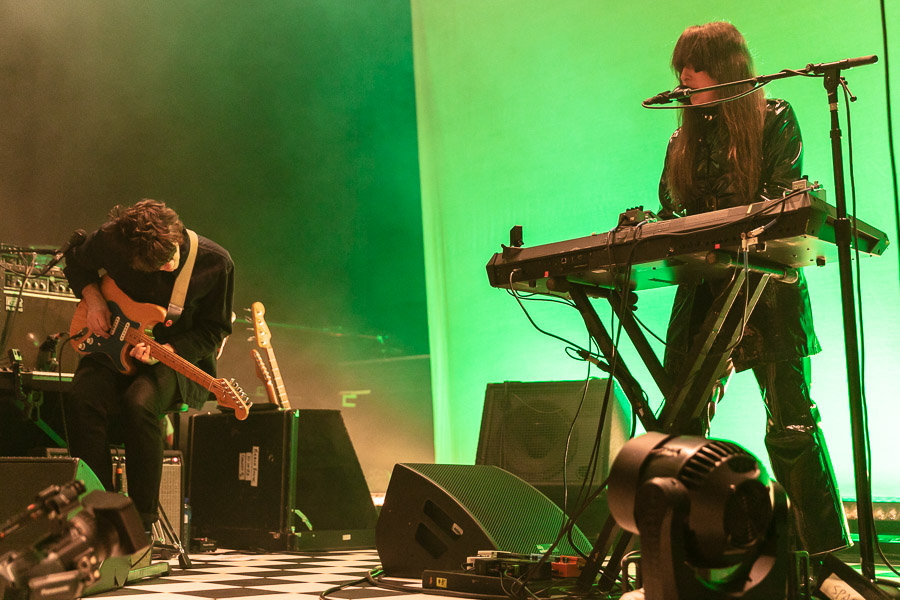
Beach House performing at the 7 tour in Oslo in October 2018.

On March 7, 2018, the band officially announced the release of their seventh album, which would be titled 7, unveiling its album cover, track list, pre-orders, and an accompanying world tour in addition; the tour would begin on April 30 in Chattanooga, Tennessee and conclude on October 20, 2018, in Dublin. On April 27, 2018, two weeks prior to the release of the album, an exclusive stream of 7 was accessible, via Sub Pop's website, to Sub Pop customers who pre-ordered the album.

7 was officially released on CD, vinyl, cassette, digital download and streaming services on May 11, 2018, through Sub Pop worldwide, Bella Union in Europe and Mistletone in Australia/New Zealand, respectively. An accompanying animated album visualizer, which was entirely directed by San Charoenchai, was uploaded to the band's YouTube channel upon the album's release, with each song being accompanied by psychedelic animations in black and white. Days after the album's release, Beach House performed a live in-studio session on KCRW in Los Angeles on May 15. They also performed "Drunk in LA" as musical guests on Jimmy Kimmel Live! the following day. On October 23, they announced later Australian tour dates, which included shows between February and March 2019.

=== Singles and music videos ===
On February 15, 2018, "Lemon Glow" was released as the lead single from 7, which was untitled at the time. A "groovy checkered" visualizer was released to accompany the single on the same day. On the same day, they released its second single and its accompanying visualizer, "Dive". They released "Dark Spring" as the album's third single on April 2, of the same year, alongside a music video directed by Zia Anger. "Black Car" was released as the fourth single on May 2, 2018, along with its accompanying visualizer. An accompanying music video for the song was directed by Legrand's brother, Alistair Legrand, and was released on June 18.

"Drunk in LA" was sent to Italian radio on September 10, as the album's fifth single. On the following day, September 11, an accompanying music video for the track — directed by Kember — was released, alongside a Sonic Boom remix of "Black Car". On October 23, 2018, the band released a limited edition 7-inch vinyl of "Lose Your Smile", containing a new track from the recording sessions of 7 titled "Alien" as its B-side. It was sold during the band's European tour, in dates from September to October. In addition, a visualizer for "Alien" was uploaded on the same day, which was directed by Charoenchai, and was also released as a standalone single to digital download and streaming services. On November 15, a music video for "Pay No Mind" was released; filmed and directed by their close friend, Michael Hirsch, it consists of tour footage recorded between 2015 and 2018.

=== Title and aesthetic ===
The album's title, 7, itself simply represents it being the duo's seventh studio album, saying they "hoped its simplicity would encourage people to look inside. No title using words that we could find felt like an appropriate summation of the album," although they later mentioned that the number 7 represents some interesting connections in numerology, which further inspired them in naming the album as such. Edie Sedgwick inspired the black-and-white pop art visuals and psych heavy sound of the album. "I was drawn to somebody like Edie because she has beauty on the outside but she also struggled with her mask," Legrand stated. The album cover features a collage of torn-apart photographs of landscapes, buildings and crowds of people, as well as pieces of women's faces. Scally stated that album cover features photographs in the public domain, formed into a collage by Post Typography.

== Critical reception ==
Professional ratings
Aggregate scores
Source	Rating
AnyDecentMusic?	7.8/10
Metacritic	80/100
Review scores
Source	Rating
AllMusic	4.5/5 stars
The A.V. Club	A−
Entertainment Weekly	B+
The Guardian	4/5 stars
The Independent	4/5 stars
The Irish Times	4/5 stars
Pitchfork	8.9/10
Q	3/5 stars
Rolling Stone	4/5 stars
Uncut	7/10

At Metacritic, which assigns a normalized rating out of 100 to reviews from mainstream publications, 7 received an average score of 80, based on 29 reviews, indicating "generally favorable reviews". In her review for The Independent, Roisin O'Connor wrote, "Instead of limiting themselves, Beach House are finally embracing all of their creative moments, which have inevitably challenged them to become better artists." The Line of Best Fit's Chris Taylor stated that 7 is "as much of a reinvention as we're likely to get from Beach House but even those small steps to the left offer up yet another captivating record," and finished his review saying, "By this point, we really should just stop worrying about when Beach House are going to go stale because it's still nowhere near happening. It's still a pleasure to be lost in their world." Writing for Stereogum, Gabriela Tully Claymore called 7 the duo's "boldest album yet". Eugenie Johnson of The Skinny wrote, "While they may not have completely achieved seventh heaven here, 7 is still a solid first step heralding Beach House's next phase."

Rolling Stone's Simon Vozick-Levinson called 7 "a radical blast of psychedelic pop bliss," saying "These are big songs, full of wonder, and Beach House know it. Seven albums in, they're at the start of something new." Jayson Greene of Pitchfork praised the album, writing "Beach House remain masters of the indefinable and their seventh album is their heaviest and most immersive-sounding of their career." AllMusic critic Heather Phares wrote, "Throughout 7, Beach House feel more concerned with capturing moments fully rather than conforming to notions of what a cohesive album is. That these songs sound like they came from different albums is ultimately more refreshing than disorienting, and the excitement that courses through each track is palpable." David Sackllah of Consequence of Sound said, "7 finds the band taking risks and unlearning the parameters they had set for themselves to craft their most adventurous record yet," concluding: "By retooling their sound and shaking off any complacency that may have settled in, Beach House make their claim as one of the preeminent indie rock bands of the decade." Leah Greenblatt of Entertainment Weekly said "7's artful wooziness is hardly new, but for Beach House, it feels like home." Frank Guan of Vulture called 7 the duo's best album yet, writing "the darkness and directness of its sound, combined with Legrand's customary sibylline vocals, add up to something welcome and unprecedented in the Beach House catalogue — their best album in an already impressive set."

Kelsey J. Waite of The A.V. Club wrote, "With 7, Legrand and Scally have gotten freer themselves. This is the sound of a band that knows itself extremely well and yet, in seeking outside perspectives and embracing imperfection, has discovered a whole new level to explore. If this album feels like an alternate-reality Beach House, it's because Legrand and Scally have altered their reality." Tiny Mix Tapes' Matthew Neale gave 7 a perfect score and called it the duo's greatest album. Clash lauded the record, writing: "The Baltimore duo have somehow gifted us their masterpiece, and though the rain outside has now stopped, new heavens have opened." Joe Goggins of Drowned in Sound said that 7 is "a record that gets closer to the band's self-imposed boundaries than they ever have before without really threatening to break them down." Flood Magazine's Alex Swhear praised the record's "expansive, almost oceanic aura."

== Track listing ==
All tracks are written by Beach House.

No.	Title	Length
1.	"Dark Spring"	3:24
2.	"Pay No Mind"	3:24
3.	"Lemon Glow"	4:04
4.	"L'Inconnue"	4:24
5.	"Drunk in LA"	3:59
6.	"Dive"	4:25
7.	"Black Car"	4:11
8.	"Lose Your Smile"	4:09
9.	"Woo"	4:14
10.	"Girl of the Year"	3:51
11.	"Last Ride"	6:59
Total length:		47:04

== Personnel ==
Credits adapted from the liner notes of 7.

- Beach House – arrangement, performance; production, engineering
  - Victoria Legrand
  - Alex Scally
- James Barone – live drums (arrangement, performance); engineering (including drums on track 6)
- Sonic Boom – accordion (track 5), drill (track 3); production
- Mikhail Pivovarov – engineering
- David Tolemei – engineering, additional editing and recording
- Jason Quever – engineering (tracks 8, 9)
- Alan Moulder – mixing
- Caesar Edmunds – engineering (mix)
- Greg Calbi – mastering
- Post Typography – album art, design

== Charts ==
Chart (2018)	Peak position
Australian Albums (ARIA)	39
Belgian Albums (Ultratop Flanders)	10
Belgian Albums (Ultratop Wallonia)	55
Canadian Albums (Billboard)	65
Dutch Albums (Album Top 100)	31
French Albums (SNEP)	65
German Albums (Offizielle Top 100)	41
Irish Albums (Official Charts)	28
Irish Independent Albums (IRMA)	3
New Zealand Heatseeker Albums (RMNZ)	1
Portuguese Albums (AFP)	21
Scottish Albums (Official Charts)	14
Spanish Albums (Promusicae)	19
Swiss Albums (Schweizer Hitparade)	54
UK Albums (Official Charts)	16
UK Independent Albums (Official Charts)	3
US Billboard 200	20
US Independent Albums (Billboard)	2
US Top Alternative Albums (Billboard)	3
US Top Rock Albums (Billboard)	3

== Release history ==
Region	Date	Label	Format	Ref.
Various	May 11, 2018	Sub Pop	CD; LP; cassette; digital download	
Europe	May 11, 2018	Bella Union	CD; LP; cassette; digital download	
Australia	May 11, 2018	Mistletone	CD; LP; cassette; digital download	
New Zealand	May 11, 2018	Mistletone	CD; LP; cassette; digital download	
