= Once Twice Melody =

- Digital release and "Gold Edition" cover

Studio album by Beach House
- Released: February 18, 2022
- Recorded: May 2018 – July 2021
- Studios: Apple Orchard (Baltimore, Maryland); Pachyderm Studio (Cannon Falls, Minnesota); United Studio (Los Angeles); Village Recorders (Los Angeles)
- Genres: Dream pop; neo-psychedelia
- Length: 84:28
- Labels: Sub Pop; Bella Union
- Producer: Beach House

Beach House chronology
7 (2018)	Once Twice Melody (2022)	Become (2023)

Alternative cover
- Silver Edition cover, used on standard physical releases of the album

Singles from Once Twice Melody
- 1. "Once Twice Melody" Released: November 10, 2021; 2. "Hurts to Love" Released: February 14, 2022; 3. "Superstar" Released: April 4, 2022

Once Twice Melody is the eighth studio album by the American dream pop duo Beach House. It was released on February 18, 2022, through Sub Pop, with its four chapters being released throughout four months starting November 10, 2021. A follow-up of their seventh studio album 7 (2018), they began recording the album in 2018 at their home studio, Apple Orchard Studio, in Baltimore, with additional recording taking place at Pachyderm Studio, United Studio and Village Recorders until July 2021.

A double album of 18 songs, Once Twice Melody is presented in four chapters with several musical styles being used throughout, including dream pop and neo-psychedelia. Upon release, the album received universal acclaim by music critics, and debuted at number 12 on the US Billboard 200 chart, with 24,000 album-equivalent units. To support the album, "Once Twice Melody", "Hurts to Love" and "Superstar" were released as singles. Beach House additionally embarked the Once Twice Melody Tour in 2022, in support of the album.

== Background ==
On June 30, 2017, the band released the compilation album B-Sides and Rarities, as they realized that they had many songs that were either previously unreleased or were hard to find among fans. They also stated that releasing the 14-track compilation album helped them "clean the creative closet, put the past to bed, and start anew." On May 11, 2018, Beach House released their seventh studio album 7 (2018), where they limited their writing to arrangements that they were able to perform live and eventually deciding to follow what came naturally, letting their creative spirits determine the album's feeling.

After releasing 7, the band began recording their next album at Apple Orchard Studio in Baltimore. It was then announced in February 2021 that they would contribute to arts company Meow Wolf's interactive exhibition Omega Mart, releasing a short film titled "Marin's Dreams" on April 22, 2021. In the same month, guitarist Alex Scally revealed, in an interview with Rolling Stone, that he and lead vocalist Victoria Legrand were thinking of working on an eighth album, adding that they would "like to get there". In a September 2021 interview with 101.9 KINK FM, the band revealed that it would be released in 2022.

== Recording and production ==
Once Twice Melody was recorded from May 2018 to July 2021, as well as during the COVID-19 pandemic. A majority of the songs were recorded at the band's home studio, Apple Orchard Studio. While Legrand and Scally were writing the album's songs and accompanying melodies, they noticed a high usage in string synthesizers and had experimented with strings on various songs to see if they "wanted" them. In order to record the album, Scally had taught himself to be an audio engineer, handling the recording for Legrand's vocals, which took a five-month period that ended in late 2021. Live string arrangements were handled by David Campbell; along with those, live drums were recorded in Los Angeles, with the album's mixing being handled by four mixing engineers, largely by Alan Moulder.

== Composition ==
=== Music and concept ===
Well, the idea of chapters was something that emerged. If you think about the beginning of making this record to now, it's been three years and two of those years were writing and writing and writing, then recording and processing, doing all of this building; all of the architecture and the blood and muscle tissue, the bones.

— Victoria Legrand, Teeth (2022)

Once Twice Melody is a double album consisting of 18 tracks and a total length of over 84 minutes, making it their longest album to date. It has been described as a dream pop and neo-psychedelia album that incorporates elements of ambient, chillwave, chamber pop, folk, shoegaze, symphonic, and synth-pop. Throughout the album, there are tracks without live drums, electronic songs without guitar, and "wandering and repetitive melodies", as described by Beach House; additionally, it is their first album where a live string ensemble was used and the first to be produced entirely by the band. Lyrical themes throughout revolve around cynicism, heartbreak, melancholia, redemption, romance, self-destruction, and yearning.

Split into four chapters, Legrand explained to Consequence that there is not a "right" way to listen to the album, adding that "you can just get lost [in the album] how you want to". Scally stated that they split the songs into four chapters based on "the energy of the music [and] the lyrics". According to Legrand, the album features "a lot of love inside of it", as well as "a sacredness of nature". She also described the album as having "multiple little universes inside it".

=== Chapters 1–2 ===
Serving as the album's titular opening track, "Once Twice Melody" begins with "majestic" notes of "washy" synths, with the entire track incorporating fingerpicked acoustic guitar notes and an arrangement of live strings as provided by Campbell, blending Baroque and electronic music textures. Legrand begins the song's first verse with the lyric "out in the summer sun", often chanting "la-la-la" in the chorus. Its overall sound has been likened to that of Stereolab, Broadcast and Spacemen 3. "Superstar" is a six-minute track with an M83-like atmosphere that "pays homage to '80s Californian rock". "Pink Funeral" is a nocturnal track that begins with "stabbing" strings, just before shifting into a composition consisting of "haunting" staccato notes and a drum pad. "Through Me" is a melancholic track that contains looped vocals and arpeggiated synthesizers, later ending with a trap beat.

"Runaway" is a track with chillwave influences, featuring electronic beats, arpeggiated synthesizers and the usage of a vocoder. "ESP" has a "hit-worthy" melody that is shaded under reverb. "New Romance" features Legrand's "hypnotic" vocals, as well as twinkling synthesizers. In the chorus, she chants the acronym "I-L-Y-S-F-M". With a length of seven minutes, "Over and Over" is the album's longest track. A symphonic number which consistently builds suspense, it incorporates elements of ambient music, combining interstellar chorals, surf guitar licks, and bouncing synth bass keys.

=== Chapters 3–4 ===
The third and fourth chapters of Once Twice Melody sees more versatility and experimentation than its previous chapters. Described as a campfire song, and a sentimental ballad, "Sunset" is psychedelic folk number that pairs an acoustic guitar with strings and wind chimes. The song's meditative and reflective tone gets "immediately interrupted" by the next track, "Only You Know", which is a stadium-ready shoegaze track. "Another Go Around" is a "lilting and luminous" song that relies on a "bouncy" bass riff and synthesizers. "Masquerade" is a synth-pop track that avoids the usage of guitars, instead fusing elements of the electropop inspirations found throughout the band's previous studio album, 7 (2018), as well as chillwave and gothic pop textures. Bill Pearis from BrooklynVegan noted the possible usage of the Casio SK-1 keyboard in the track.

"Finale" is a synth-pop track that evokes the sound of LCD Soundsystem, according to Ellen Johnson from Paste. "The Bells" is an acoustic ballad with country music influences that also sees the usage of slide guitars, denoting hints of the band's earlier sound. Critics from Music Feeds Pitchfork noted the track's similarities to Leonard Cohen's song "Hallelujah". "Hurts to Love" is another synth-pop track with Europop influence that has been compared to the musical style of bands The Human League and OMD. "Many Nights" is a mid-tempo lullaby-like track. Serving as the album's closing track, "Modern Love Stories" is a maximalist shoegaze-leaning symphonic pop composition. The song contains cinematic strings throughout, and its first half fades into acoustic guitar strumming, which then concludes into a grand instrumental ending.

== Promotion and release ==
Once Twice Melody was released for digital download and streaming, with the addition of cassette, CD and LP releases, on February 18, 2022, through Sub Pop and Bella Union. The album was announced on November 9, 2021, and the band stated that it would be released in four chapters throughout four months; the first chapter, Pink Funeral, was released on November 10, 2021, with the title track being released as its lead single on the same day, while its second chapter, New Romance, was released on December 8, and its third chapter, Masquerade, was released on January 19, 2022. "Hurts to Love" was surprised released as a standalone single on February 14, to coincide with Valentine's Day, serving as the album's second single. Lyric animations for each chapter and individual song were also uploaded onto YouTube.

Once Twice Melody debuted atop the US Billboard Top Album Sales chart, with 20,300 copies sold in its first week; in addition it debuted atop the US Top Alternative Albums, Top Rock Albums and Top Vinyl Albums charts. It also debuted at number 12 on the US Billboard 200 album chart with 24,000 album-equivalent units, adding their fourth top-20 entry on the chart. "Superstar" was later sent to US radio on April 4, 2022, as its third single, while the title track peaked at number 15 on the US Adult Alternative Airplay chart. The band performed the former on The Late Show with Stephen Colbert on May 20, 2022. To support the album, the band embarked the Once Twice Melody tour, which began on February 18, 2022, in Pittsburgh and ended on July 24, 2022, in Washington, D.C..

== Critical reception ==
Professional ratings
Aggregate scores
Source	Rating
AnyDecentMusic?	7.8/10
Metacritic	84/100
Review scores
Source	Rating
AllMusic	4.5/5 stars
The A.V. Club	B+
The Daily Telegraph	4/5 stars
Exclaim!	7/10
The Line of Best Fit	9/10
Mojo	4/5 stars
NME	4/5 stars
Paste	8.4/10
Pitchfork	7.8/10
Uncut	8/10

Once Twice Melody was released to universal acclaim from contemporary music critics. At Metacritic, which assigns a normalized rating out of 100 to reviews from mainstream critics, the album received an average score of 84, based on 22 reviews, which indicates "universal acclaim". Aggregator AnyDecentMusic? gave it 7.8 out of 10, based on their assessment of the critical consensus.

Reviewing the album for AllMusic, Heather Phares claimed that, "Though Once Twice Melody is unapologetically lush even by Beach House's standards, the duo uses space creatively to express the beauty in sadness." Stevie Chick of Mojo called it the band's "grandest vision yet", praising the "impassive beauty" of Legrand's vocals and comparing them to "'O Superman'-era Laurie Anderson serenades, or as if someone programmed AI to sing like Judee Sill." Jason Anderson of Uncut commended the "stunning" cinematic quality of the first chapter and praised the album's "unexpected elements" for deftly counterbalancing the "grandeur and glamour from becoming sickly sweet." Uncut concluded that the album's "greatness lies not in its hugeness – it's in the duo's ability to create music that possesses the same intimacy regardless of its scope."

== Track listing ==
All tracks are written by Beach House.

Chapter 1. Pink Funeral
No.	Title	Length
1.	"Once Twice Melody"	4:44
2.	"Superstar"	6:08
3.	"Pink Funeral"	4:56
4.	"Through Me"	5:48
Total length:		21:36

Chapter 2. New Romance
No.	Title	Length
5.	"Runaway"	4:23
6.	"ESP"	3:48
7.	"New Romance"	4:12
8.	"Over and Over"	7:11
Total length:		19:34

Chapter 3. Masquerade
No.	Title	Length
9.	"Sunset"	3:59
10.	"Only You Know"	4:49
11.	"Another Go Around"	3:41
12.	"Masquerade"	4:42
13.	"Illusion of Forever"	3:49
Total length:		21:00

Chapter 4. Modern Love Stories
No.	Title	Length
14.	"Finale"	4:34
15.	"The Bells"	4:30
16.	"Hurts to Love"	4:05
17.	"Many Nights"	4:16
18.	"Modern Love Stories"	4:53
Total length:		22:18 84:28

== Personnel ==
Credits adapted from the liner notes of Once Twice Melody.

Beach House

- Victoria Legrand
- Alex Scally
- James Barone

Musicians

- Michael Scally – guitar solo (3)
- Wheatie Mattiasich – additional vocals (9)
- Rebecca Morrin – additional vocals (9)

Technical

- David Campbell – live strings arrangement
- Nick Tveitbakk – live drums engineering (1, 2, 4, 5, 8, 10, 12–14, 18)
- Trevor Spencer – live drums engineering (2–4, 6–9, 11), mixing (5, 11)
- Gabe Burch – live strings engineering
- Travis Warner – live strings engineering
- Johnny Morgan – assistant live drums engineering (2–4, 6–9, 11)
- Alan Moulder – mixing (1–4, 6–8, 10, 12, 16, 18)
- Caesar Edmunds – mixing (9, 13, 15, 17)
- Dave Fridmann – mixing (14)
- Mike Fridmann – assistant mixing (14)
- Greg Calbi – mastering
- Steve Fallone – mastering

Artwork

- Beach House – art direction
- Jeff Kleinsmith – art direction, design
- Nicholas Law – inside heart art

== Charts ==
Chart performance for Once Twice Melody
Chart (2022)	Peak position
Australian Albums (ARIA)	68
Austrian Albums (Ö3 Austria)	53
Belgian Albums (Ultratop Flanders)	18
Belgian Albums (Ultratop Wallonia)	111
Dutch Albums (Album Top 100)	64
French Albums (SNEP)	138
German Albums (Offizielle Top 100)	14
Irish Albums (IRMA)	78
Scottish Albums (Official Charts)	9
Spanish Albums (Promusicae)	57
Swedish Vinyl Albums (Sverigetopplistan)	8
Swiss Albums (Schweizer Hitparade)	22
UK Albums (Official Charts)	65
UK Independent Albums (Official Charts)	4
US Billboard 200	12
US Independent Albums (Billboard)	2
US Top Alternative Albums (Billboard)	1
US Top Rock Albums (Billboard)	1
