= Painting With =

- Portrait of Avey Tare, one of three variations of the album's front cover.

Studio album by Animal Collective
- Released: February 19, 2016
- Recorded: 2015
- Studios: EastWest Studios, Hollywood
- Genres: Psychedelic pop; experimental pop
- Length: 41:02
- Label: Domino

Animal Collective chronology
Live at 9:30 (2015)	Painting With (2016)	The Painters (2017)

Singles from Painting With
- 1. "FloriDada" Released: November 30, 2015; 2. "Lying in the Grass" Released: February 1, 2016; 3. "Golden Gal" Released: February 15, 2016

Geologist cover

Panda Bear cover

Painting With is the tenth studio album by American experimental pop band Animal Collective, released on February 19, 2016. The album is a follow-up to Centipede Hz (2012), and features contributions from John Cale and Colin Stetson. It peaked at No. 46 on the Billboard 200. Three singles were issued: "FloriDada" (2015), "Lying in the Grass", and "Golden Gal" (both 2016). A companion EP, The Painters, was released the following year.

For Painting With, the band's line-up consists of Avey Tare (David Portner), Panda Bear (Noah Lennox), and Geologist (Brian Weitz), the same trio which participated for Merriweather Post Pavilion (2009). Deakin (Josh Dibb), who had regrouped into the collective in November 2010 for Centipede Hz, and toured with them from 2011 to 2013, is absent opting to focus on finishing his solo debut Sleep Cycle (2016).

== Background and recording ==
After touring for Centipede Hz (2012), the band felt stressed out, and retreated to individual side-projects. David Portner (Avey Tare) formed Avey Tare's Slasher Flicks, Noah Lennox (Panda Bear) recorded his fifth solo album Panda Bear Meets the Grim Reaper (2015), and Brian Weitz (Geologist) took care of his newborn daughter for the latter half of 2014. In early 2015, Lennox confirmed that the band would be returning to the studio to record a new album, while Portner intimated in April: "Yeah, over the past few months I've been writing some songs. I think we're starting to have a group of songs that we're thinking about recording."

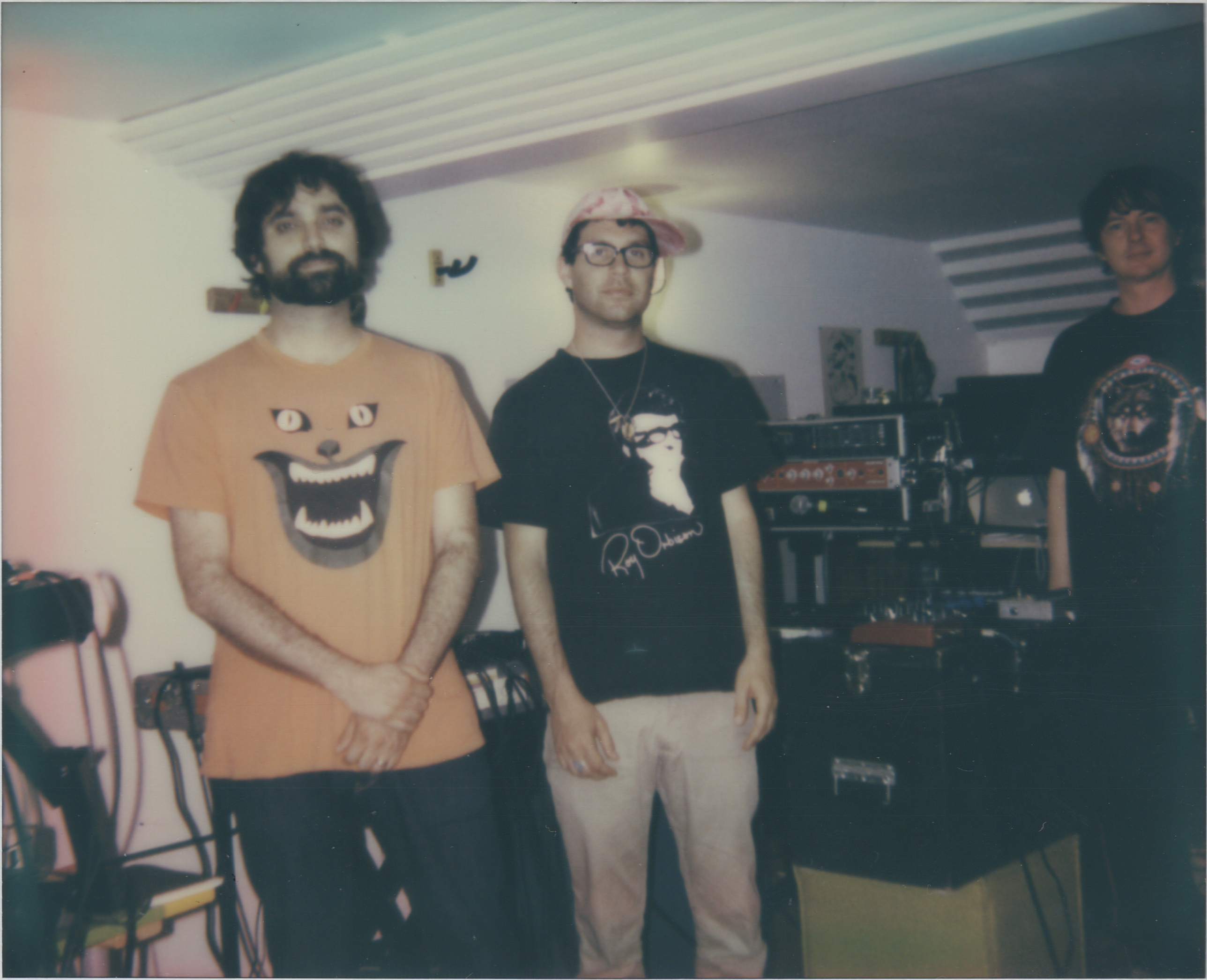
Animal Collective at Drop of Sun Studios, 2015

In May 2015, Animal Collective began writing and rehearsing new material at Drop of Sun Studios in Asheville, North Carolina and EastWest Studios, Hollywood. The band recorded in the Studio 3 room at EastWest, the same room used by Brian Wilson for the Beach Boys' albums Pet Sounds (1966) and Smile. The album was subsequently mixed at Gang Recording Studio in Paris, France with Sonny DiPerri. Portner called it "incredible" to record in EastWest: "You really understand that there is an art that goes into building rooms like that. It’s no surprise so many good records have been created there. I think [EastWest’s original constructor] Bill Putnam was a genius." Weitz recalls that while at EastWest: "The guys would deliver [instruments to us] ... they'd be like, 'This was used in Planet of the Apes. These metal rods that make these singing tones' … they're like 'These are from the Poltergeist soundtrack."

Guest appearances include John Cale, who recorded a drone part for the track "Hocus Pocus". Portner explained: "My sister has been working on the visual side of John’s more recent live shows. She discovered that he was actually a fan of our music, which made us really psyched. We had this part that we just couldn’t nail or get to sound right in “Hocus Pocus,” and I really thought we should have someone attempt to do it with a live instrument. Because of the drone-y string sound we wanted to achieve, we all thought John would be great for it."

== Music ==
"On Delay"
"On Delay", the eighth track of the album.

"Golden Gal"
"Golden Gal", the eleventh track of the album and its third single, demonstrating the album's dry vocals and use of modular synthesizers.

The album's color palette is dominated by modular synthesizers and an array of percussion instruments borrowed from the collection of studio drummer Emil Richards. In contrast to their previous work, Animal Collective decided to eliminate the reverb effects and drawn-out musical passages. Portner commented: "Everything seems drenched in reverb these days, and is so distant. In a way, it was a reaction to that." Weitz added: "We talked about no ambient [passages]. Even [2009's] Merriweather Post Pavilion, people were saying was our poppiest record up to that point, but there still were like long, drawn-out passages of drone. With this one we were just like in and out. No long buildups to get to it, no long outros. We talked about, like, our Ramones record." Lennox elaborated with a comparison to the first Ramones album:

There was this idea of wanting to do something with short songs, with a homogenous energy to the record. ... not that we expected the music to sound like that, but we wanted to do something where the first song revs up the engine, and it kind of just cruises after that. We didn’t want to throw in some ethereal moment. We wanted to do something that blasted away the whole time.

The group drew on ideas of the prehistoric, such as cave paintings and dinosaurs, which were used to influence the songwriting process and the recording sessions themselves, "[aiming to eschew] slow jams for a set of songs inspired by more elemental pleasures ... [and] artists who could make a lot happen in a short amount of time," writes Jeremy Gordon.

The album also makes extensive use of hocketing, in which Portner and Lennox rapidly trade vocal lines, often alternating syllable by syllable.

== Promotion and release ==
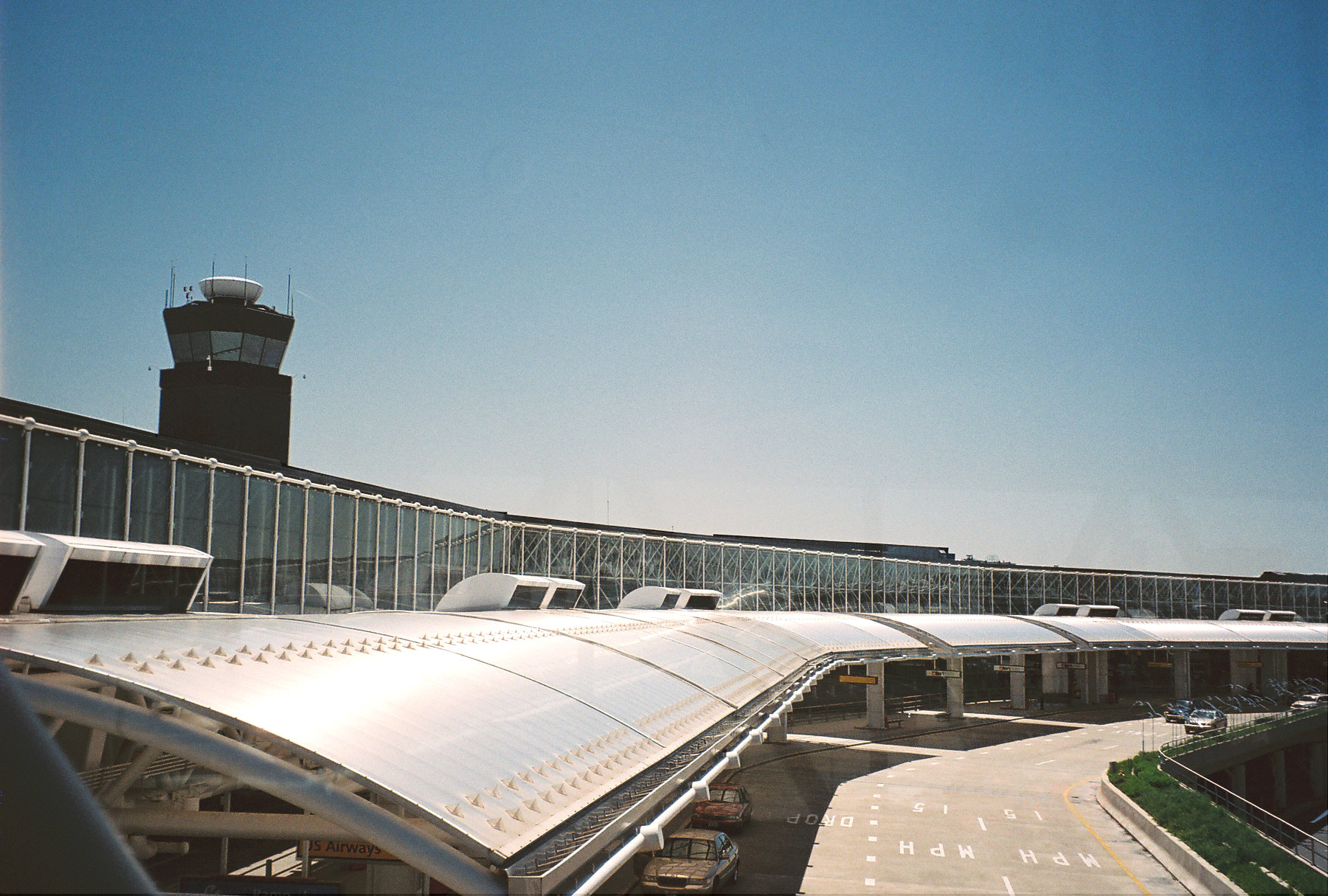
Baltimore-Washington International Airport, where Painting With was premiered

On July 15, 2015, EastWest announced that the band had finished recording their new album, the follow-up to Centipede Hz. On November 25, the album premiered over the speakers of Baltimore-Washington International Airport, and played on loop until the evening. Using Sony's Music Track ID system, it was discovered that the airport recordings belonged to an unreleased 12-track Animal Collective album entitled Painting With. A representative of the band responded with "no comment today", while Portner confirmed that "FloriDada", the impending single from the album, would be released on November 30. On November 30, "FloriDada" was released and the album and track listing were officially revealed. The same day, both the LP and CD versions of the album were made available for pre-order. Upon pre-ordering the vinyl, users received an immediate download of "FloriDada" as well as an eventual 7" containing two new tracks "Gnip Gnop" and "Hounds of Bairro". On January 28, 2016, a promotional video was released to youtube revealing a new "Painting With" app for iOS. This app allowed early access to the song "Lying in the Grass" for the first time.

The album has three distinct covers painted by Brian DeGraw which individually depict Portner, Lennox, and Weitz.

== Critical reception ==
Professional ratings
Aggregate scores
Source	Rating
AnyDecentMusic?	6.7/10
Metacritic	69/100
Review scores
Source	Rating
AllMusic	4/5 stars
DIY	4/5 stars
Drowned in Sound	5/10
The Guardian	3/5 stars
Mojo	3/5 stars
Pitchfork	6.2/10
Rolling Stone	3.5/5 stars
Slant Magazine	4/5 stars
Spin	8/10
Uncut	4/5 stars

Painting With received mostly positive reviews from contemporary music critics. At Metacritic, which assigns a normalized rating out of 100 to reviews from mainstream critics, the album received an average score of 69, based on 36 reviews, which indicates "generally favorable reviews". Rolling Stone's Jon Dolan called it "weirdly addictive and enjoyably absurd". Marc Hogan of Spin praised the album for its "richness" in his review, stating, "It’s poppier, in a characteristically warped way, than even Merriweather, the group's most popular album to date. That’s down to the record’s rarely wavering energy; subtle details abound in the interplay between Lennox and Portner’s near-indistinguishably overlapping yawps, or in the giddy, ping-ponging sonic backdrops, but that’s all a bonus when the songs bounce along like Tigger in a 5 Hour Energy ad." Jamie Atkins of Record Collector compared the album's sound to the soundtrack of the 1992 video game Sonic the Hedgehog 2, "the band sounding like a motley crew of Deadheads and club kids stuck between the Mystic Cave and Oil Ocean zones, in constant fear of Dr Robotnik's frankly unreasonable temper and whichever drill or submarine he might pilot next." It continues: "It does take repeated listens for the album to really make sense, but when the mood fits, Painting Is [sic] hits the spot."

Jamieson Cox of the Verge characterized Painting With as: "bright, tidy, and a little disappointing ... They were the last band you expected to end up sounding workmanlike." Mike Powell of Pitchfork Media added, "Painting With feels, more than anything, like a kind of construction project: Each sound meticulously built and only faintly familiar, each second crammed with doodads, as though the band was worried either they or their audience might get bored. The human voice, which in the past has given their music not just a so-called human element but a devotional, almost religious glow, has been reduced to a party trick, with Avey Tare and Panda Bear trading syllables like two anxious Globetrotters. The album's best songs—"Golden Gal," "Recycling"—aren't just highlights, they're breathers."

In a negative review, Lee Arizuno of The Quietus called the album "absolute dogshit from start to finish", repeatedly describing each song as "a sing-song number with faux–naïf lyrics ... and EDM belches". Adam Downer of Paste compared it to the "legion of small-time blog bands in the early 2010s ... who could do a decent facsimile of the Animal Collective sound but lacked the intangibles to garner their acclaim ... [the album is] not very noteworthy, the band nowhere close to fulfilling its potential. The scariest thing Painting With leaves behind is the feeling that Animal Collective think that’s perfectly fine."

== Track listing ==
No.	Title	Length
1.	"FloriDada"	4:05
2.	"Hocus Pocus"	3:16
3.	"Vertical"	4:14
4.	"Lying in the Grass"	3:34
5.	"The Burglars"	2:43
6.	"Natural Selection"	2:41
7.	"Bagels in Kiev"	2:48
8.	"On Delay"	3:48
9.	"Spilling Guts"	1:58
10.	"Summing the Wretch"	3:08
11.	"Golden Gal"	4:41
12.	"Recycling"	4:06
Total length:		41:02

== Personnel ==
Animal Collective

- Panda Bear (Noah Lennox)
- Avey Tare (David Portner)
- Geologist (Brian Weitz)

Additional musicians

- John Cale – drone on "Hocus Pocus"
- Colin Stetson – saxophone on "FloriDada"

== Charts ==
Chart (2016)	Peak position
Australian Albums (ARIA)	100
Belgian Albums (Ultratop Flanders)	87
Belgian Albums (Ultratop Wallonia)	121
Irish Albums (IRMA)	91
Portuguese Albums (AFP)	43
UK Albums (Official Charts)	42
US Billboard 200	46
