= Sinister Grift =

Studio album by Panda Bear
- Released: February 28, 2025
- Studio: Estudio Campo (Lisbon)
- Genres: Psychedelic pop; tropical rock
- Length: 44:44
- Label: Domino
- Producers: Josh Dibb; Noah Lennox

Panda Bear chronology
Reset in Dub (2023)	Sinister Grift (2025)	A ? of WHEN (2026)

Sinister Grift is the seventh studio album by American musician Panda Bear, released on February 28, 2025, on Domino Recording Company. Primarily a collaboration between Panda Bear and his Animal Collective bandmate Deakin, the album was co-produced by the pair, with additional contributions from their bandmates Geologist and Avey Tare, the Spirit of the Beehive's Rivka Ravede and Cindy Lee.

== Background and recording ==
Sinister Grift was recorded at Noah Lennox' own Estudio Campo in Lisbon, Portugal. He co-produced the album with Animal Collective bandmate Josh Dibb, also known as Deakin. Dibb described work on the album as a "sacred and warm return" between the two, combining "30 years" of songwriting together as part of the band as well as a "new chapter" for Lennox.

== Critical reception ==
Professional ratings
Aggregate scores
Source	Rating
AnyDecentMusic?	7.3/10
Metacritic	81/100
Review scores
Source	Rating
AllMusic	4/5 stars
DIY	4/5 stars
The Guardian	4/5 stars
The Line of Best Fit	8/10
Mojo	4/5 stars
Pitchfork	8.5/10
Record Collector	3/5 stars
The Skinny	4/5 stars
Slant Magazine	3/5 stars
Under the Radar	8.5/10

On Metacritic, which assigns a normalized score out of 100 to ratings from mainstream publications, the album received a weighted mean score of 81 based on 15 reviews, indicating "universal acclaim". Sadie Sartini Garner of Pitchfork awarded Sinister Grift the distinction of Best New Music and praised the emotional complexity displayed by Panda Bear on the album. Garner observed that the artist appears to be "falling apart" but is ultimately "cool with chilling" until it gets better. In a four-star review, Andrew Male of Mojo noticed a "dubious uplift" throughout the record which eventually reveals an "exquisite melancholy introspection", sprinkled with "optimism" as well as "sadness". The Guardian's Alexis Petridis highlighted the "striking emotional arc" as presented by Lennox, with plenty of "playlistable psych-pop" that "turns introspective".

In a mixed review, Charles Lyons-Burt at Slant Magazine acknowledged the "affable and good-natured spirit" that runs through the album but also sensed that Lennox might have not felt "entirely comfortable" venturing "into rock terrain" as he did on the record. In a two-star review, Franz Mauerer of Laut.de opined that Lennox became "weirdly predictable" and described the album as "boring". Mauerer added that the second star out of five was awarded solely for the album's "craftsmanship" and none for its entertainment value.

== Track listing ==
All tracks are written by Noah Lennox; "Anywhere but Here" written with Nadja Lennox.

Sinister Grift track listing
No.	Title	Length
1.	"Praise"	3:31
2.	"Anywhere but Here"	4:39
3.	"50mg"	4:34
4.	"Ends Meet"	3:21
5.	"Just as Well"	3:33
6.	"Ferry Lady"	4:42
7.	"Venom's In"	4:52
8.	"Left in the Cold"	4:37
9.	"Elegy for Noah Lou"	6:15
10.	"Defense" (featuring Cindy Lee)	4:35
Total length:		44:44

== Personnel ==
- Noah Lennox – vocals, guitar, bass, production, engineering (all tracks); percussion (tracks 1–7), drums (1–6, 10), synthesizer (1–6), piano (7), sounds (8)
- Josh Dibb – production, mixing, engineering (all tracks); synthesizer (tracks 5, 6), percussion (8), piano (10)
- Heba Kadry – mastering
- Paul Mercer – mixing assistance
- Brian Weitz – sounds (tracks 1, 3, 4, 6, 8, 9)
- Maria Reis – backing vocals (tracks 1, 4)
- Rivka Ravede – backing vocals (track 1, 4), artwork
- Nadja Lennox – vocals (track 2)
- Walsh Kunkel – lap steel guitar (tracks 3, 7, 8)
- Dave Portner – noises (track 4)
- Cindy Lee – guitar (track 10)
- Steven Lind – guitar engineering (track 10)
- Björn Copeland – art direction
- Rob Carmichael – design

== Charts ==
Chart performance for Sinister Grift
Chart (2025)	Peak position
Scottish Albums (Official Charts)	67
UK Albums Sales (OCC)	43
UK Independent Albums (Official Charts)	16
US Top Album Sales (Billboard)	37
