= All Things Being Equal (album) =

Studio album by Sonic Boom
- Released: 5 June 2020
- Length: 56:41
- Label: Carpark
- Producer: Peter Kember

Sonic Boom chronology
Spectrum (1990)	All Things Being Equal (2020)	Reset (2022)

Singles from All Things Being Equal
- 1. "Just Imagine" Released: 3 March 2020; 2. "Things Like This (A Little Bit Deeper)" Released: 5 May 2020

Professional ratings
Aggregate scores
Source	Rating
Metacritic	84/100
Review scores
Source	Rating
AllMusic	4/5 stars
Clash	8/10
Exclaim!	8/10
Pitchfork	7.7/10
Under the Radar	8.5/10

All Things Being Equal is the second studio album by English singer and producer Peter Kember, under the stage name Sonic Boom. It was released on 5 June 2020 under Carpark Records.

The album marks 30 years since the release of Sonic Boom's first album in 1990 "Spectrum".

== Critical reception ==
All Things Being Equal was met with "universal acclaim" reviews from critics. At Metacritic, which assigns a weighted average rating out of 100 to reviews from mainstream publications, this release received an average score of 84, based on 10 reviews.

== Track listing ==
All Things Being Equal track listing
No.	Title	Length
1.	"Just Imagine"	7:58
2.	"Just a Little Piece Of Me"	5:34
3.	"Things Like This (A Little Bit Deeper)"	5:00
4.	"Spinning Coins and Wishing on Clovers"	6:25
5.	"My Echo, My Shadow and Me"	3:00
6.	"On a Summer's Day"	6:38
7.	"The Way That You Live"	3:32
8.	"Tawkin Tekno"	4:50
9.	"I Can See Light Bend"	5:20
10.	"I Feel a Change Coming On"	8:24

== Charts ==
Chart performance for All Things Being Equal
Chart (2020)	Peak position
Scottish Albums (OCC)	42
UK Dance Albums (OCC)	3
UK Independent Albums (OCC)	17
