= Forever Alien =

Album by Spectrum

Studio album by Spectrum
- Released: 4 August 1997
- Studio: Cabin Studios, Coventry
- Genre: Electronic; space music; psychedelia
- Length: 77:38
- Label: Space Age Recordings
- Producer: Alf Hardy; Sonic Boom

Spectrum chronology
Highs, Lows and Heavenly Blows (1994)	Forever Alien (1997)	A Lack of Teadrops (1999)

Forever Alien is the third studio album by British space rock band Spectrum, a project led by Peter Kember under the pseudonym Sonic Boom. It was released in August 1997 by Space Age Records. After the band's preceding EP Songs for Owsley (1996) moved them away from guitar-oriented music and towards electronic music, Forever Alien furthered this approach considerably, as Kember aimed to create a predominately electronic album that sounded organic and analogue in style. The record is dominated by vintage analogue synthesizers, including the EMS VCS 3 and EMS Synthi AKS. Kember had become fascinated by the synths as he felt they presented him with more musical possibilities than guitars.

The resulting album fuses psychedelic music with influences from the 1960s electronic music of the BBC Radiophonic Workshop. "Feels Like I'm Slipping Away" was released as a single. Although Forever Alien did not chart in either the United Kingdom or United States, it was a modest radio success in the US, and received acclaim from critics. Musicians such as Helena Hauff and Ekoplekz have since cited it among their favourite albums. Will Carruthers joined Spectrum on their 1997 tour in support of the album.

== Background ==
In 1994, Spectrum released the album Highs, Lows and Heavenly Blows, which explored atypical compositional structures and musical scales. Following its release, lead member (and former Spacemen 3 member) Peter Kember, who used the pseudonym Sonic Boom, entered the band into a short hiatus as he resumed working on other musical projects. Spectrum reconvened in 1996 for A Pox on You, a collaboration with Seattle band Jessamine, and also released the Songs for Owsley EP in late 1996. The EP was named in tribute to LSD manufacturer Owsley Stanley, and moved Spectrum away from guitar-oriented music and towards a keyboard-dominated direction, making use of synthesiser distortion, predicting the musical style of Forever Alien, which also incorporated the songs found on Songs for Owsley. The EP ranged from the "goofy and threatening" semi-title track "Owsley", with heavily distorted vocals and noise elements, to the calm instrumental "Liquid Intentions." Spectrum followed Songs from Owsley with the recording of Forever Alien, their first non-collaborative album in three years.

== Recording and production ==
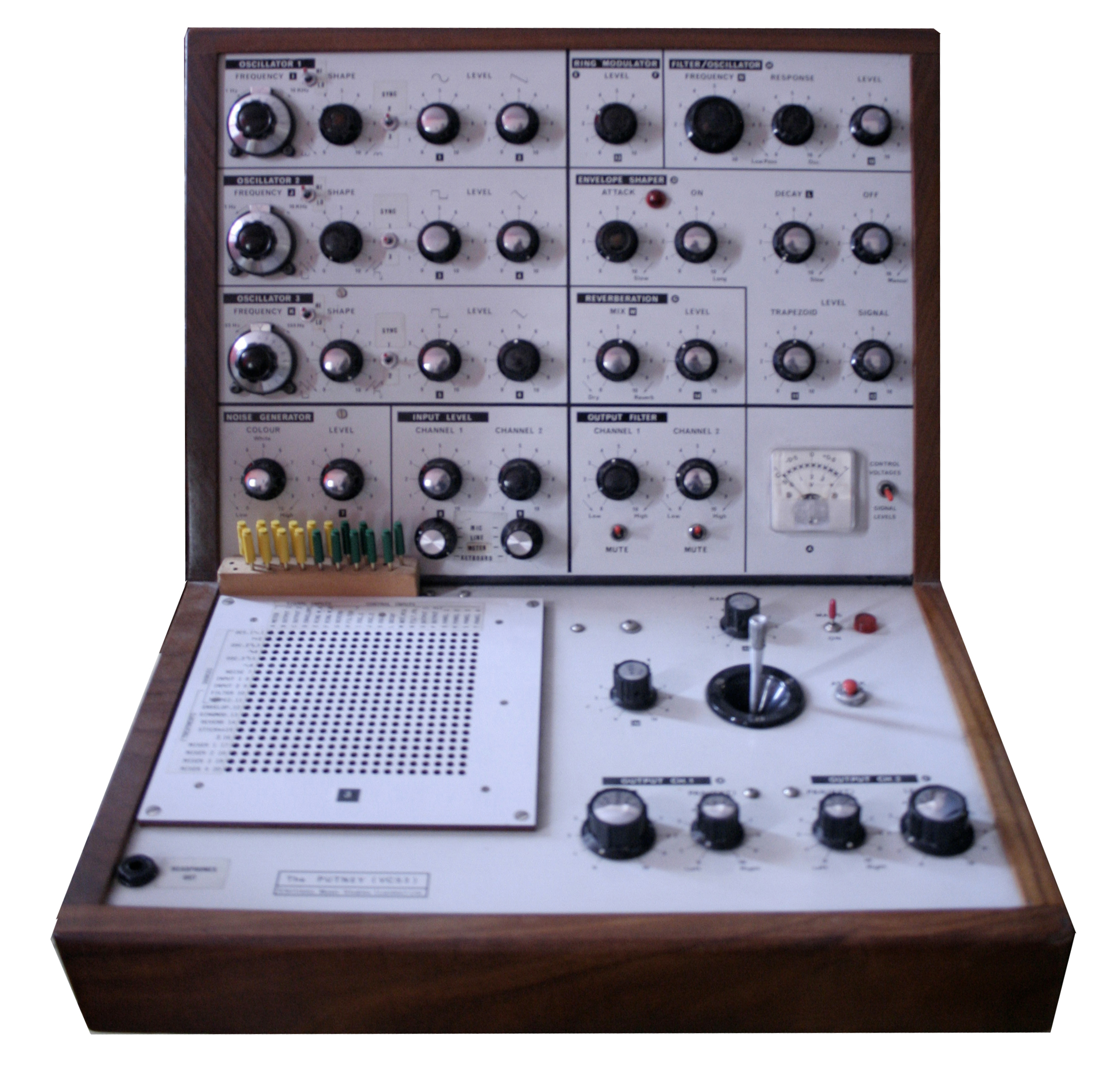
Forever Alien is dominated by vintage synthesizers like the EMS VCS 3 (pictured).

Kember's vision for Forever Alien was to create a predominantly electronic album that did not sound "super sequenced and block-y," and aimed to bring to the album "some of the flowing stream of effects" he was experiencing under the influence of DMT. He later explained: "I was writing what I felt were some quite soul-searching songs and I wanted to marry it all in another world. In another land, if you will." Kember recorded Forever Alien with fellow members Alf Hardy and Pete Bain, the latter of whom is credited as Pete Bassman. The album was recorded at Cabin Studios, Coventry with Hardy co-producing with Kember (again credited as Sonic Boom). Andre Knecht mastered the album at Ark Digital Pasadena, Canada.

Kember was becoming interested in modular synthesisers at the time, including the EMS VCS 3, and became intrigued in the "endless possibilities" he felt they presented. Consequently, Forever Alien was recorded mainly vintage analogue synthesisers. Kember was intrigued with modular synthesis as it allowed him to create more effects than he could with the "limited palette" of a guitar, and also allowed him to "control it with great detail and link things." He later described the VCS 3 as a "very elegant study in limited resources" and noted his taste for the synth's slow modulations and slow changes, which he felt was absent in most synths. He elaborated: "A lot of equipment never lets you get dangerous. You just get this narrow band of what’s considered usable. I like stuff with the safety locks all taken off. I was always interested in sounds that were not really of this world. I very much believe in animism. Inanimate objects and sounds can have real personalities."

As Forever Alien was Kember's attempt to explore modular synthesis, the album features little of Kember's guitar work and contains almost no songs with bass. Kember instead plays a range of electronic instruments, namely the EMS VCS 3, EMS Synthi AKS, OSC OSCar, the theremin and the Serge Modular Music System, in addition to singing on the album and using the vocoder. Hardy also uses the vocoder, and plays voltage-controlled synthesisers and the vibraphone, while Bain is credited for "programming vibrations." During recording, Kember contacted former BBC Radiophonic Workshop musician Delia Derbyshire after he noticed his friend's copy of the BBC Radiophonic Music album contained a blurb about Derbyshire that mentioned her birthplace as Coventry. Kember remained friends with the musician for the last years of her life, and credits her with teaching him "pretty much everything I know about the physics of sound. The basis of modular synthesis I taught myself, but stuff like the harmonic series, she'd spend endless hours helping me get it into my thick head."

== Composition ==
"Forever Alien records the bleeps and blurbs of a vintage synth-machine as it wandered the cerulean recesses of the galaxy, leaping with itinerant speed between post-War Europe and the pre-millennial frontier."

— Biographer Erik Morse

Forever Alien is dominated by Kember's vintage keyboards, in addition to usage of vocoders and theremins, continuing the style indicated on Songs for Owsley. Ned Raggett of AllMusic described the resulting sound as resembling "a head-on collision between 1957-era sci-fi movies, 1968 psych, and whatever else is floating through Sonic's brain." Stephen Thompson of The A.V. Club described the album as "tripped-out hazy music-from-space," and noted the incorporation of layered electronics, looped samples and a "keen gift for subconscious melody." Option magazine note the album's focus on drones, textures and treatments of "a decidedly non-rock perspective". The album was inspired by the 1960s analogue electronic music of the BBC Radiophonic Workshop, and songs which pay direct homage include "Owsley" and "The Stars Are So Far." Writer Erik Morse wrote that the album "endeavoured to merge the electronic alchemy of Clara Rockmore, Louis and Bebe Barron, Richard Maxfield and Delia Derbyshire, with a traditional pop-song structure."

Kember's vocals on opening song "Feels Like I'm Slipping Away" are treated to present an "air of desperation among all the unworldly burbles and noises" according to Raggett, who also noted a contrast via the song's "pretty melody." "The Stars are So Far (How Does It Feel)" is a remake of Spacemen 3's "How Does It Feel?"; the lyrics and delivery remain intact, but the Spectrum version uses synthesizers to create the song's psychedelic, rhythmic backing. Option described the song as resembling "a cross between Laurie Anderson's 'O Superman' and an episode of The Outer Limits. "Delia Derbyshire" is influenced by and named after the BBC Radiophonic Workshop musician of the same name. "Owsley" feature theremin and synthesiser tones ominously 'swirling' around a "demented vocal recitation," contributing to a claustrophobic feel. The title track is spoken word in style. "The New Atlantis" mixes lyrics concerning "sound-houses" from Francis Bacon's novel New Atlantis with a repeating melody and spontaneous "blurbs and burbles." It has been described one of the album's "blips-and-bloops" instrumentals.

== Release and promotion ==
Forever Alien was released on 4 August 1997 in the United Kingdom by Space Age Recordings and the 3rd Stone imprint. In the United States, it was released by Space Age and Reprise Records. The cover of Forever Alien depicts the VCS 3, as played on the album, and the overall packaging of the album (designed by Andy Smith) has been described as a "love letter to synth technology." While the Reprise edition features ten songs, including three songs from the Songs for Owsley EP, the British version appends alternate versions of the two remaining other songs from the Songs for Owsley EP, in addition to "Sounds for a Thunderstorm (For Peter Zinovieff)", a tribute to said composer. The album charted in neither the UK or US national charts. On the CMJ Radio Top 200 chart, compiled from reports of American college and non-commercial airplay, the album reached a peak of number 44. The record also concurrently peaked at number 37 on the equivalent CMJ Retail chart, compiled from sales reports from major American independent retailers.

For the album's accompanying 1997 tour, Spectrum were joined by former Spiritualized member Will Carruthers, who also played on Spectrum's "Songs the Spaceman Taught Us" tour in 2001. To promote Forever Alien, "Feels Like I'm Slipping Away" was released as a single in the UK in September 1997, with "Forever Alien", "Dream Time" and "What Comes Before After?" as B-sides. The single was re-released in the US in June 2000 with the same track listing.

== Critical reception ==
Professional ratings
Review scores
Source	Rating
AllMusic	3.5/5 stars
NME	3/10
The Virgin Encyclopedia of Nineties Music	3/5 stars

In a contemporary review of Forever Alien, Option wrote that "Sonic's idea of a good day is not worrying about having to tune a guitar. He's happy as a Venusian clam too, having steered his post-S3 band up into the ether." Ned Raggett of AllMusic described Forever Alien as an album of "crackers," highlighting the songs re-appearing from Songs for Owsley as being among the best. He also described "Feels Like I'm Slipping Away" as "amazing" and praised the song's "wonderful" contrasts. Stephen Thompson of The A.V. Club praised the album's "keen gift for subconscious melody". Although he felt some of the instrumentals, such as "The New Atlantis", failed to gel into songs, and criticised the title track for being "self-serious goop," he nonetheless conceded that "Kember usually gets his atmospherics to sound sufficiently creepy and compelling" throughout the album.

In a list for The Quietus, electronic artist Ekoplekz cited Forever Alien as one of his 13 favourite albums. He said the album "probably had a lot to do with awakening my subsequent interest in Radiophonic music," and felt the album's tribute to Delia Derbyshire was notable as "at the time [she] was barely remembered by anyone." He also felt the album "had a lot to do with my music radar gradually shifting sideways into more esoteric areas beyond the formal conventions of techno-derived electronica." Helena Hauff also cited Forever Alien as one of her 13 favourite albums in another list for The Quietus. She described it as "just a great listening album. Sitting at home listening to it is very relaxing, very interesting, very beautiful. It would be one of those albums I'd put on when I was in the mood also for Serge Gainsbourg albums."

In a 2011 interview, Kember said that Spectrum rarely play Forever Alien live as it requires a different set-up to their other material, due to the album's instrumentation largely relying on modular synths. He elaborated: "We don't play to a big enough audience that we can afford to travel all that [gear] around. It's pretty tough — we do all the driving, we don’t have any road crew, we don’t have a sound guy."

== Track listing ==
All tracks written by Kember except where noted.

1. "Feels Like I'm Slipping Away" – 5:32
2. "The Stars Are So Far (How Does It Feel?)" – 7:01
3. "Close Your Eyes and You'll See" – 6:03
4. "Delia Derbyshire" – 4:29
5. "Owsley" – 5:43
6. "Forever Alien" – 4:26
7. "Matrix" – 5:00
8. "Like....." (Kember, Sutcliffe) – 5:09
9. "The New Atlantis" (traditional, arr. Kember) – 5:29
10. "The End" – 5:14
11. "Sounds for a Thunderstorm (For Peter Zinovieff)" – 5:02
12. "Liquid Intentions" – 14:56
13. "Sine Study" – 3:30

== Personnel ==
- Sonic Boom – synthesizers, theremin, vocoder, vocals, writing, producing
- Alf Hardy – voltage controlled synthesizers, vocoder, vibraphone, producing, engineering
- Pete Bassman – programming vibrations
- Andy Smith – artwork
- Andrew Knecht – mastering
