= Buoys (album) =

Studio album by Panda Bear
- Released: February 8, 2019
- Studio: Lisbon, Portugal
- Length: 31:00
- Label: Domino
- Producer: Panda Bear; Rusty Santos

Panda Bear chronology
A Day with the Homies (2018)	Buoys (2019)	Reset (2022)

Singles from Buoys
- 1. "Dolphin" Released: November 8, 2018; 2. "Token" Released: January 14, 2019

Professional ratings
Aggregate scores
Source	Rating
Metacritic	71/100
Review scores
Source	Rating
AllMusic	3.5/5 stars
Consequence of Sound	B−
The Guardian	3/5 stars
Pitchfork	7.6/10
Slant Magazine	4/5 stars

Buoys is the sixth studio album by American musician Panda Bear, released on February 8, 2019. It was preceded by the lead single "Dolphin", released along with its music video, and features collaborations with Chilean DJ Lizz and Portuguese singer Dino D'Santiago.

== Recording ==
The album was co-produced by Panda Bear (Noah Lennox) with Rusty Santos in Lisbon, Portugal, where Lennox has lived since 2004. The last record the two worked on was Lennox's 2007 album Person Pitch. Lennox also stated that he wanted to create music that would "feel familiar to a young person's ears", so worked with Santos to utilize production techniques of current music. Rolling Stone stated that the sound of the record is different from Lennox's previous material and evident on "Dolphin", which contains a "single guitar, a faint bassline and some textured samples" around Lennox's vocals. Lennox himself called the album the "beginning of something new".

== Track listing ==
No.	Title	Length
1.	"Dolphin"	3:41
2.	"Cranked"	3:19
3.	"Token"	3:37
4.	"I Know I Don't Know"	2:51
5.	"Master"	4:04
6.	"Buoys"	2:34
7.	"Inner Monologue"	4:37
8.	"Crescendo"	3:10
9.	"Home Free"	3:07
Total length:		31:00

== Charts ==
Chart (2019)	Peak position
Portuguese Albums (AFP)	40
UK Independent Albums (OCC)	44
US Independent Albums (Billboard)	7
US Top Album Sales (Billboard)	60
US Indie Store Album Sales (Billboard)	5
US Vinyl Albums (Billboard)	8
