= FloriDada =

Single by Animal Collective

from the album Painting With
- Released: November 30, 2015
- Recorded: 2015
- Genre: Psychedelic pop
- Length: 4:05
- Label: Domino
- Songwriter: Animal Collective
- Producer: Animal Collective

Animal Collective singles chronology
"Applesauce" (2012)	"FloriDada" (2015)	"Lying in the Grass" (2016)

Music video
- "FloriDada" on YouTube

"FloriDada" is a song by Animal Collective, released as the first single from their 2016 album Painting With on November 30, 2015 by Domino Records.

== Background and composition ==
In an interview with Newsweek, bandmember Avey Tare stated that the song was "sort of inspired by hating on people from Florida". In another interview, the band told Rolling Stone that the record was intended to be "minimal", made of "short blasts", and "not soaked in the reverb the band had built their woozy sound on".

The composition of the song is described as "giddy", "goofy", and "harmony-soaked", with "high-pitched vocals" countering "crunchy electronics". The chorus goes off measure. Jon Dolan of Rolling Stone described the song as "Pet Sounds sped up to Ramones velocity".

== Music video ==
A music video for the song was released on January 8, 2016, representing "this borderline-nonsensical, relentlessly playful spirit." It was produced and directed by the Brooklyn, New York artist collective PFFR. The video had its television premiere on Adult Swim's Toonami block on January 9, 2016.
