= Panda Bear Meets the Grim Reaper =

Studio album by Panda Bear
- Released: January 9, 2015
- Recorded: 2013–2014
- Studio: Miosotis Garage (Almada, Portugal); Estudio Namouche (Lisbon, Portugal)
- Genre: Psychedelia; electro-pop
- Length: 51:10
- Label: Domino
- Producer: Panda Bear; Sonic Boom

Panda Bear chronology
Mr Noah (2014)	Panda Bear Meets the Grim Reaper (2015)	Crosswords (2015)

Singles from Panda Bear Meets the Grim Reaper
- 1. "Boys Latin" Released: December 15, 2014

Panda Bear Meets the Grim Reaper is the fifth studio album by American recording artist Panda Bear (aka Noah Lennox). Coproduced by Sonic Boom of Spacemen 3, it was released on January 9, 2015, by the Domino Recording Company. Panda Bear Meets the Grim Reaper was preceded by the digital release of an extended play, Mr Noah, and two singles, "Mr Noah" and "Boys Latin". It was followed by the extended play Crosswords.

== Background and development ==
Having recorded his bleaker previous album Tomboy (2011) in a basement, Lennox wanted to go into the opposite direction on Panda Bear Meets the Grim Reaper, aiming for a more "lively" and "busy" sound. He began working on the album while recording Animal Collective's Centipede Hz (2012) in Texas.

Sonic Boom, who mixed and mastered Panda Bear's previous album Tomboy, co-produced the album. The two spent two weeks in November 2013 refining demo recordings Panda Bear had made at home and spent five weeks, beginning in January 2014, finishing the album. Sonic Boom mixed the album on the Balearic island of Menorca. About the album title, Lennox said "It's about presenting something that we don't have an easy time dealing with in a costume that's just a little bit more clown-y." It was also inspired by the titles of 1970s dub collaboration albums such as Augustus Pablo Meets Lee Perry and the Wailers Band and King Tubbys Meets Rockers Uptown.

We’re constantly forced through experiences that allow us to become something new—to create a new identity. Moving [to Portugal] was something like that for me. I had this vision of a future for myself as a person that lived in America, and then all of a sudden it was completely demolished.

—Panda Bear on the use of death as a metaphor on the album

== Composition ==
In conversation with The Quietus, Lennox called the LP "my hip-hop album" due to its extensive use of sampled breakbeats, many of them commonly used. Lennox cited Dust Brothers, Q-Tip, A Tribe Called Quest, Pete Rock, DJ Premier, 9th Wonder, and J Dilla as influences. The lyrical themes of the album center around personal growth, although Lennox wanted to discuss issues on a larger scale because he wanted to avoid "self-obsession or narcissism".

The opening track, "Sequential Circuits", is a piece of neo-psychedelia that was described as "swirling" and "pure as a babbling brook". "Tropic of Cancer" contains a harp sample from the Nutcracker suite and its lyrics concern the death of Panda Bear's father. His vocal harmonies on the song were compared to those of The Beach Boys.

== Release and promotion ==
In March 2014, Lennox announced a North American tour for May during which he would be performing tracks from the new album. From July through September, he toured Europe and North America. On January 11, 2015, Lennox played a Boiler Room set at MoMA PS1. Three days later, he performed "Boys Latin" on The Tonight Show Starring Jimmy Fallon. Lennox toured his show throughout Europe in March 2015. He performed at the Coachella Valley Music and Arts Festival on April 12 and 19 and gave seven more North American performances across April and early May. Lennox performed at festivals for the rest of May and mid-June, including Shaky Knees Festival in Atlanta, Lightning in a Bottle Festival in Bradley, California, Primavera Sound Festival in Barcelona and Pitchfork Music Festival in Chicago.

Lennox released a mixtape called PB vs. GR on September 11, 2014. On October 23, Lennox released the EP Mr Noah and made Panda Bear Meets the Grim Reaper available for pre-order. That day also saw the release of the album's first single, "Mr Noah", and a music video directed by AB/CD/CD. A teaser video for the album, directed by Danny Perez, was released on October 29. The second single, "Boys Latin", was released on December 15, and was accompanied by a music video directed by Isaiah Saxon and Sean Hellfritsch. The music video had its premiere on Adult Swim. A "Boys Latin" remix by Andy Stott was released on March 2, 2015. A music video for the track "Tropic of Cancer" was directed by fellow Animal Collective member Dave Portner and released on April 8.

On January 4, 2015, Lennox began his global radio campaign to premiere nine new tracks from the album. Various radio stations from around the world each premiered different tracks. Two days later, he launched an interactive website including music by him and Sonic Boom, videos by Danny Perez, as well as graphics by Marco Papiro, Patakk, and Hugo Oliveira. A short documentary detailing the creation, Panda Bear Meets the Grim Reaper, directed by Sam Fleischner, was released on January 29.

== Critical reception ==
Professional ratings
Aggregate scores
Source	Rating
AnyDecentMusic?	7.9/10
Metacritic	82/100
Review scores
Source	Rating
AllMusic	4.5/5 stars
The A.V. Club	B−
Consequence	B
The Guardian	4/5 stars
Mojo	4/5 stars
The Observer	4/5 stars
Pitchfork	8.7/10
Q	4/5 stars
Slant	7/10
Spin	8/10

Panda Bear Meets the Grim Reaper was praised by contemporary music critics. At Metacritic, which assigns a normalized rating out of 100 to reviews from critics, the album received an average score of 82, based on 34 reviews, indicating "universal acclaim".

Writing for Consequence, Adam Kivel lauded the "multivalent" production of the album but criticized Panda Bear's choice not to deviate from his signature sound. Matthew Ritchie of Exclaim! commended the "pure breadth of his beat-making, his ear for expansive and deeply resonating melodies and his lyrics, which urge you to not go so gently into that good night." Pitchfork wrote that "Grim Reaper achieves just the right balance of skull-splitting drone and head-noddin’ drive. In contrast to the unpredictably amorphous song structures that defined previous Panda Bear records, many of the songs on Grim Reaper lock into a looped beat and rarely waver course." In a mixed review, Chris Mincher of The A.V. Club stated that the album "isn't too interested in taking on big challenges. Rather, Lennox distills the results of his electro-psychedelic experiments into simpler elements that pair well with (relatively) straightforward melodies and throwback hip-hop techniques", concluding that the album "doesn’t push boundaries so much as it delineates the contours of Lennox’s comfort zone."

=== Accolades ===
Accolades for Panda Bear Meets the Grim Reaper
Publication	Accolade	Year	Rank
Pitchfork	The 50 Best Albums of 2015	2015	22
Pitchfork	Readers' Top 50 Albums	2015	19

== Track listing ==
All tracks are written by Noah Lennox, except "Davy Jones' Locker" and "Shadow of the Colossus", by Peter Kember.

Panda Bear Meets the Grim Reaper – Standard edition
No.	Title	Length
1.	"Sequential Circuits"	3:35
2.	"Mr Noah"	4:13
3.	"Davy Jones' Locker"	0:35
4.	"Crosswords"	3:30
5.	"Butcher Baker Candlestick Maker"	3:07
6.	"Boys Latin"	4:12
7.	"Come to Your Senses"	7:23
8.	"Tropic of Cancer"	6:12
9.	"Shadow of the Colossus"	0:17
10.	"Lonely Wanderer"	4:19
11.	"Principe Real"	4:54
12.	"Selfish Gene"	5:05
13.	"Acid Wash"	3:42
Total length:		51:10

Panda Bear Meets the Grim Reaper – iTunes Store Bonus Mr Noah EP edition
No.	Title	Length
1.	"Mr Noah"	4:13
2.	"Faces in the Crowd"	4:08
3.	"Untying the Knot"	3:10
4.	"This Side of Paradise"	4:34
Total length:		1:07:15

Sample credits

- "Crosswords" contains a sample of "Ashley's Roachclip", performed by The Soul Searchers.
- "Tropic of Cancer" contains samples of "Fragments of the ballet "The Nutcracker" Pas de Deux".
- "Lonely Wanderer" contains a sample of "Arabesque No. 1" in E major, composed by Claude Debussy, and performed by François-Joël Thiollier.

== Personnel ==
Credits adapted from the liner notes of Panda Bear Meets the Grim Reaper.

- Noah Lennox – JoMoX Xbase 999, Yamaha TX81Z, Moog Voyager, Elektron DPS-1, vocals, piano, effects, percussion, production, art direction
- Rob Carmichael – layout
- Simon Davey – mastering
- Joaquim Monte – engineering
- Hugo Oliveira – interior illustration
- Marco Papiro – cover illustrations
- Seen – art direction, layout
- Pedro Silve – assistant engineering
- Sonic Boom – EMS Synthi AKS, Fenix II Modular, Moog Voyager, vocoder, effects, production, mixing, art direction

== Charts ==
Chart performance for Panda Bear Meets the Grim Reaper
Chart (2015)	Peak position
Belgian Albums (Ultratop Flanders)	73
Belgian Albums (Ultratop Wallonia)	136
Dutch Albums (Album Top 100)	88
Scottish Albums (OCC)	66
UK Albums (OCC)	49
UK Independent Albums (OCC)	4
US Billboard 200	34
US Independent Albums (Billboard)	2
US Indie Store Album Sales (Billboard)	1
US Top Alternative Albums (Billboard)	3
US Top Rock Albums (Billboard)	4

== Release history ==
Release history and formats for Panda Bear Meets the Grim Reaper
Country	Date	Format(s)	Label	Ref.
Germany	January 9, 2015	Digital download; CD; LP	Domino	
France	January 12, 2015	Digital download; CD; LP	Domino	
Japan	January 12, 2015	Digital download	Domino	
Spain	January 12, 2015	Digital download	Domino	
United Kingdom	January 12, 2015	Digital download; CD	Domino	
Italy	January 13, 2015	Digital download; CD; LP	Domino	
Spain	January 13, 2015	CD; LP	Domino	
United States	January 13, 2015	Digital download; CD; LP	Domino	
