= Peter Kember =

English musician and record producer (born 1965)

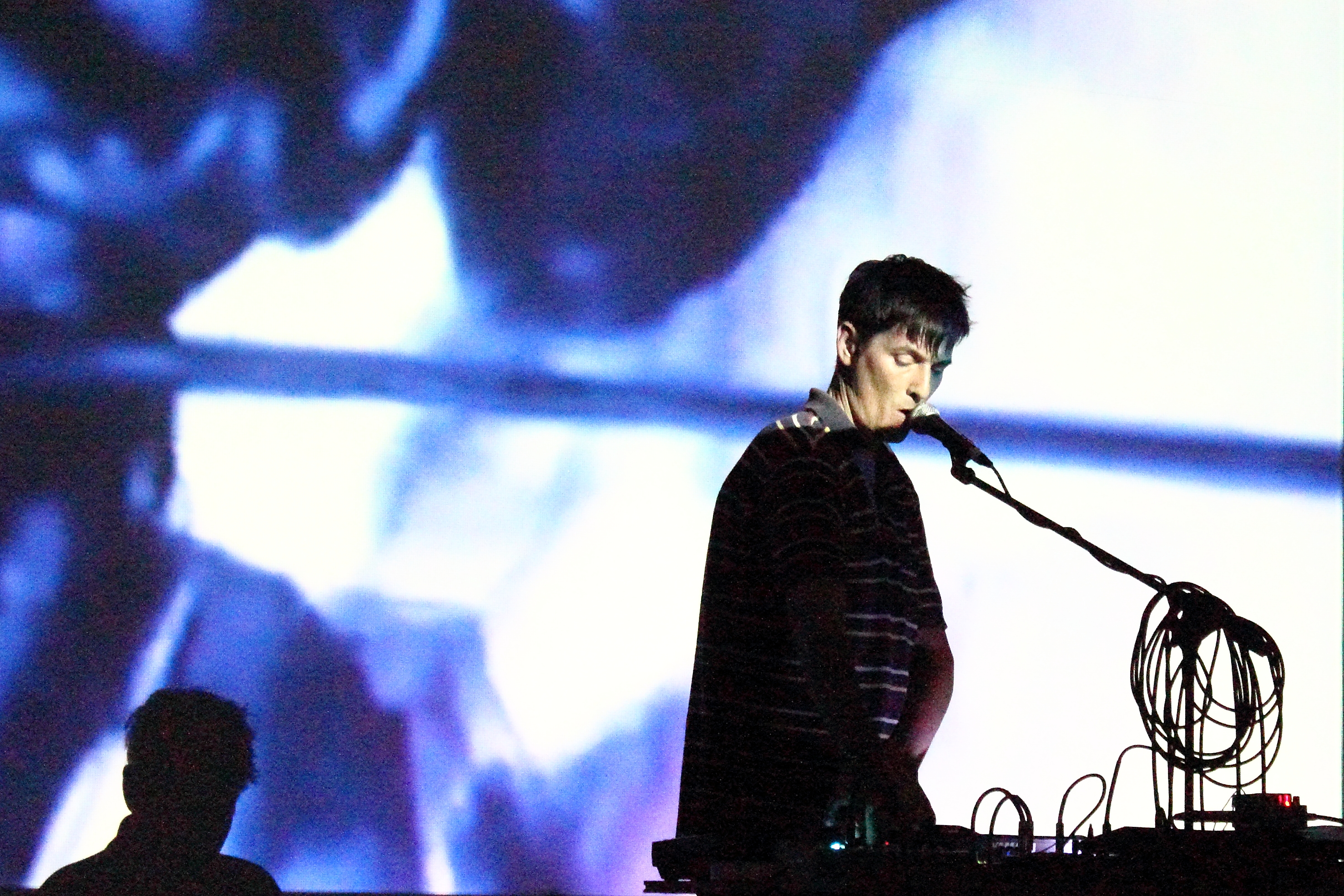
- Kember performing in 2013

Background information
- Also known as: Sonic Boom; Spectrum; E.A.R. (Experimental Audio Research)
- Born: 19 November 1965 (age 60); Rugby, England
- Genres: Alternative rock; drone; electronic; experimental; space rock
- Occupations: Singer; record producer; songwriter
- Instruments: Electric guitar; analogue synthesizer; keyboards
- Years active: 1982–present
- Label: SpaceAge

Peter Kember (born 19 November 1965), also known by his stage name Sonic Boom, is an English singer-songwriter, composer and record producer. He was a founding member, vocalist, guitarist and keyboardist of neo-psychedelic band Spacemen 3, lasting from 1982 until the band's dissolution in 1991. He is now based in Sintra, Portugal.

Kember has also led the musical projects Spectrum and E.A.R. (Experimental Audio Research), sometimes as the only member. He has played and collaborated with a number of artists, including Stereolab, Panda Bear, Yo La Tengo, and Sinner DC. He contributed production work on MGMT's second album Congratulations, Panda Bear's albums Tomboy and Panda Bear Meets the Grim Reaper, and Beach House's album 7.

== Early life and education ==
Kember lived in Dunchurch during his childhood, and attended Rugby School until he was 16. He later attended Rugby Art College where he met Jason Pierce.

== Music career ==
=== Influences ===
In discussing music that was important to him, Kember mentioned Kraftwerk, Sam Cooke, Laurie Anderson, Pierre Henry & Michel Colombier, Bo Diddley, the Sandpipers, Orchestral Manoeuvres in the Dark and George Faith.

=== Spacemen 3 ===
Kember initially came to prominence as a member of the outfit Spacemen 3.

=== Sonic Boom ===
Kember's first solo album, Spectrum, was recorded in 1989 while Spacemen 3 were still a going concern, and featured the other members of the group. A second album, All Things Being Equal, was released in 2020. A collaborative album with Sinner DC, Maps, was released in 2025 on Mental Groove Records.

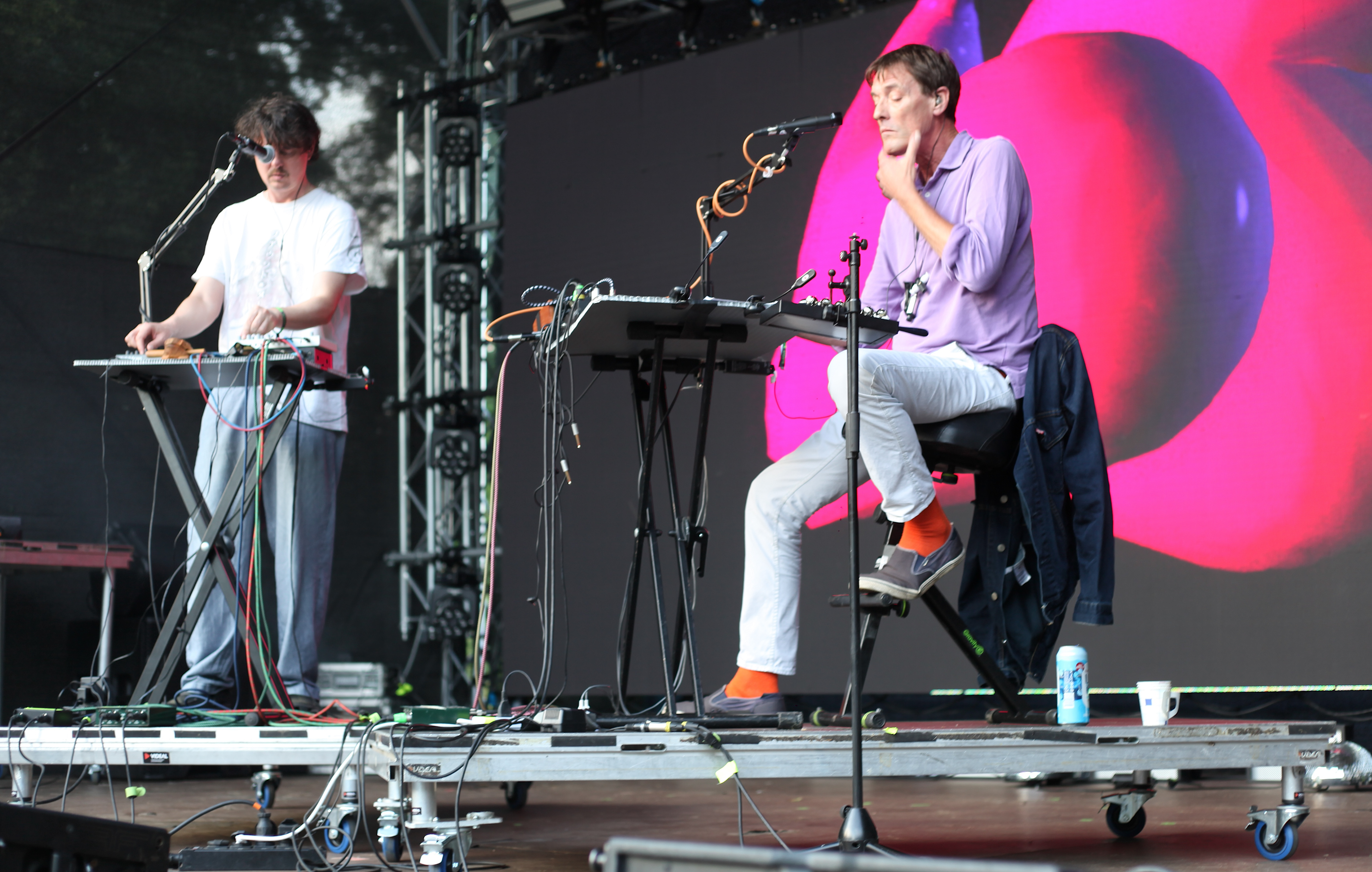
Panda Bear (Noah Benjamin Lennox, left) and Sonic Boom (Peter Kember, right) performing at KiKuMu festival in Jäneda, Estonia (July 2026)

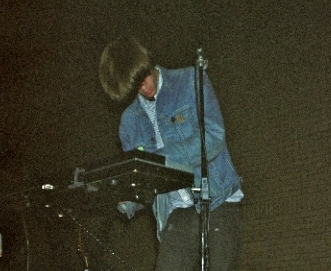
Kember playing as part of Spacemen 3 in 1989

=== Spectrum ===
Kember recruited new musicians Richard Formby, who had previously contributed guitar and keyboards to Sonic Boom's side of the final Spacemen 3 album Recurring, and Mike Stout for the group Spectrum in 1991. Initial Spectrum releases carried on from the sound of late-period Spacemen 3, featuring conventional songs and a regular band. First single "How You Satisfy Me" was an original composition by Kember and Formby reminiscent of 1960s garage bands, based as it was upon the Chip Taylor-penned pop hit "I Can't Let Go". 1992's Soul Kiss (Glide Divine) album was split between songs and longer experimental pieces featuring drones and repetition. Another single from the album, a cover version of Daniel Johnston's "True Love Will Find You in the End" reached number 70 on the UK singles charts. Formby departed the band as soon as the album was released and Stout left not long after. Highs, Lows and Heavenly Blows (1994) featured a new line-up, primarily Scott Riley (guitar/vocals) and Alf Hardy (engineer), but also including former Spacemen 3 bass player Pete Bassman (Pete Bain), was also mainly song-oriented with Scott co-writing and taking lead on Take Your Time. Kember has occasionally collaborated with Jessamine and Silver Apples under the Spectrum name.

Since 1996 the Spectrum name has been used for Kember's solo work, sometimes with Bain and recording engineer/musician Alf Hardy. The music made with Bain and Hardy was often in the same vein as E.A.R., reflecting an increased interest in vintage analogue synthesizers, especially those made by EMS. After issuing 1997's Forever Alien album, there were no further releases of new material under the Spectrum moniker until 2008's Indian Giver collaboration with Jim Dickinson. Kember has also worked with Füxa's Randall Nieman.

During 2008–11, a four-piece Spectrum toured extensively in America and Europe. This included providing main support for the 2008 reformation tour of My Bloody Valentine, and a performance at the All Tomorrow's Parties festival in May 2011. An EP, War Sucks, was released in 2009.

=== Experimental Audio Research ===
Kember formed the collective Experimental Audio Research, also known as E.A.R. Although the first E.A.R. album to be released (Mesmerised, 1994) was Kember on his own, the initial intention of E.A.R. was to record experimental "soundscape" music with collaborators. The second album, Beyond the Pale (1996), which was actually the first to be recorded, in 1992, included Kevin Shields of My Bloody Valentine, Kevin Martin and AMM's Eddie Prévost. The album was remixed by German musician Thomas Köner in 1997, and released as The Köner Experiment. Prévost also appeared on Phenomena 256 (1996) and Millennium Music (1998), both of which included a larger group of musicians. Data Rape (1998) was recorded solely by Kember, using the technique of circuit bending, which he continued to use on the Vibrations EP (2000) and Continuum album (2001). The latter two releases were made with assistance from Delia Derbyshire, formerly of the BBC Radiophonic Workshop, who also had a track named after her on the Spectrum album Forever Alien. The most recent E.A.R. release is Worn to a Shadow (2005).

=== Other musical collaborations ===
Kember has also played and collaborated with Birmingham band Magnétophone, performing with them live on European tours between 2006 & 2007 (he also managed them during this period). He has also played with The Field Trip, Stereolab, Yo La Tengo, Britta Phillips and Dean Wareham, Cheval Sombre, Cloudland Canyon, and Pat Fish of The Jazz Butcher, The Fields of Hay and with the Italian band Julie's Haircut.

2006 saw Kember mentor The Flowers of Hell through the creation of their self-titled debut, mixing and performing on a track and returning to do the same on the group's 2009 Come Hell or High Water album.

In 2022, Kember collaborated with Black Market Karma on a track The Sour Truth released in 2023. The single is produced by Kember and features him on synth and percussion.

=== Work as a producer ===
Kember produced Blair 1523's debut album, Beautiful Debris. He remixed Britta Phillips and Dean Wareham's L'Avventura album, releasing Sonic Souvenirs in 2003. In 2010, Kember undertook superervisory production on MGMT's second album, titled Congratulations. In 2011, he mixed and mastered Panda Bear's fourth album, Tomboy. In 2012 he produced TEEN's record In Limbo. In 2015, he co-produced Panda Bear's fifth album, Panda Bear Meets the Grim Reaper. He also did mixing work on Deakin's first solo work, Sleep Cycle, in 2016. Kember collaborated in the production of 7, the Beach House album released on 11 May 2018. He mixed Moon Duo's 2019 album, Stars Are the Light

== Packaging and formats ==
Spectrum and E.A.R. releases have often featured elaborate packaging, unusual formats, or limited editions. The LP version of the Sonic Boom album Spectrum came with a revolving "Op art" sleeve. 2000 copies came with a slip allowing purchasers to also buy a limited 10" coloured vinyl EP. The EP contained experimental drone recordings, with instructions to play at 16, 33, 45 or 78 RPM. The group Spectrum's first album Soul Kiss (Glide Divine) was originally released in a transparent PVC sleeve, with a blue oil and water mixture contained within it. (These notoriously burst when being shipped to record store). The LP was pressed on transparent vinyl. E.A.R.'s first single release was Pocket Symphony, a 5" vinyl record with cover art by Anthony Ausgang. E.A.R.'s "Sub Aqua / Tidal / Lunar" (1995) was an 8" vinyl release, a picture disc with a locked groove at the end of the second side. "Sputnik" (1997), a split single with Thurston Moore and Don Fleming on the other side, was pressed on glittery 7" vinyl. Another 7" single, "Data Rape (Part 9)" has a drawing by artist Savage Pencil scratched onto the B-side instead of music. 1998's "Death of a Robot" is pressed on 9" clear vinyl.

== Discography ==
=== As Sonic Boom ===
Albums:

- Spectrum (1990)
- All Things Being Equal (2020)
- Reset (2022; collaboration with Panda Bear)
- Maps (2025; collaboration with Sinner DC)
- A ? Of WHEN (2026; collaboration with Panda Bear)

Singles/EPs:

- Angel (1989)
- Octaves/Tremolos (1990)
- Drone Dream (1991)
- Mechanical Man (1994)
- The Sundowner (2000)
- The Sour Truth (2023) (with Black Market Karma)

=== As Spectrum ===
Albums:

- Soul Kiss (Glide Divine) (1992)
- Highs, Lows and Heavenly Blows (1994)
- Forever Alien (1997)
- A Lake of Teardrops [Spectrum & Silver Apples LP] (1999) (with Silver Apples)

Compilations and special releases:

- What Came Before After (1994) [compilation]
- A Lake of Teardrops (1999)
- Live Chronicles Vol. 1 (2001) [live recordings]
- Live Chronicles Vol. 2 (2001) [live recordings]
- Refractions: Thru the Rhythms of Time 1989–1997 (2004) [compilation]
- Indian Giver: Spectrum meets Cpt. Memphis (2008) [with Jim Dickinson]

Singles/EPs:

- How You Satisfy Me (1992)
- True Love Will Find You in the End (1992)
- Super Sympathy Spectrum Stocking Stuffer (1992) [split EP with The Field Trip]
- Indian Summer (1993)
- Undo the Taboo (1994)
- California Lullabye (1994)
- Songs for Owsley [EP] (1996)
- A Pox on You [Spectrum and Jessamine EP] (1996) [with Jessamine]
- Feels Like I'm Slipping Away (1997)
- Interface/Come Out to Play (1999) [split EP with Imajinery Friends]
- War Sucks [EP] (2009)

=== As E.A.R. (Experimental Audio Research) ===
Albums, etc.:

- Mesmerised (1994)
- Beyond the Pale (1996, recorded 1992) [with Kevin Shields]
- Phenomena 256 (1996)
- The Köner Experiment (1997)
- Millennium Music (1998)
- Data Rape (1998)
- Living Sound [E.A.R. & Jessamine] (1999)
- Pestrepeller (1999) (Limited to 1900 copies)
- Vibrations (2000)
- Continuum (2001)
- Worn to a Shadow (2005)

=== Remixes ===
- The Sonic Boom Mixes EP – Sinner DC (Mental Groove, 2013)
