= King Gizzard & the Lizard Wizard discography =

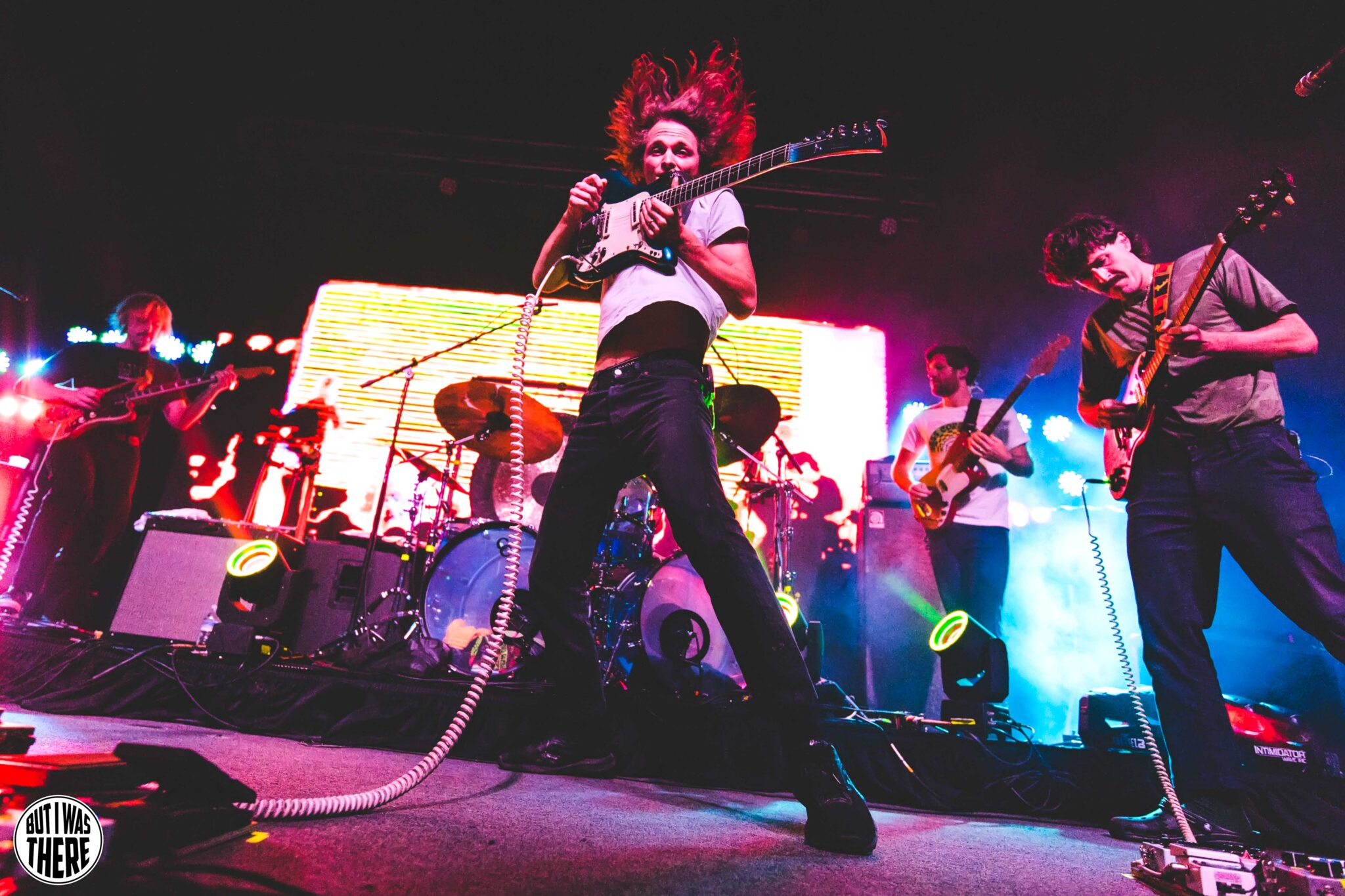
- King Gizzard & the Lizard Wizard performing in Rochester in 2022
- Studio albums: 28
- EPs: 3
- Live albums: 77
- Compilation albums: 5
- Singles: 72
- Music videos: 70
- Remix albums: 1

The discography of Australian psychedelic rock band King Gizzard & the Lizard Wizard consists of 28 studio albums, 77 live albums (all but two of which were initially released exclusively to Bandcamp), five compilation albums, one remix album, three extended plays, 72 singles, and 70 music videos.

The band released their first album, 12 Bar Bruise, in 2012. Over the next four years, they followed with seven more studio albums: Eyes Like the Sky and Float Along – Fill Your Lungs in 2013, Oddments and I'm in Your Mind Fuzz in 2014, Quarters! and Paper Mâché Dream Balloon in 2015, and Nonagon Infinity in 2016. Nonagon Infinity was their first album to reach the top 20 in their home country, peaking at number 19 on the Australia Albums Chart. In 2017 they released five studio albums: Flying Microtonal Banana in February; Murder of the Universe in June; Sketches of Brunswick East, a collaboration with Mild High Club (a music project of Alex Brettin), in August; Polygondwanaland, which was released into the public domain, in November; and Gumboot Soup, released on 31 December.

After an uncharacteristically long interval, the band released their next two albums in 2019: Fishing for Fishies in April and Infest the Rats' Nest in August. Over the course of 2020, with their touring schedule disrupted by the worldwide COVID-19 pandemic, they released seven live albums and two compilation albums, most of these through their bootlegger program. In November 2020, they released their 16th studio album, K.G., followed by the companion album, L.W., the following February. After two Australian "micro" tours in February and April 2021, they released two more live albums. On 11 June 2021 they released their 18th studio album, Butterfly 3000. After a number of vinyl copies were accidentally sent early to record stores in Europe, their 19th studio album, Made in Timeland, was officially released on 5 March 2022. Three days later, their 20th studio album, Omnium Gatherum, was announced. On 7 September 2022, the band announced three new albums to be released in October – Ice, Death, Planets, Lungs, Mushrooms and Lava, Laminated Denim and Changes – and the release of a single, "Ice V". Preorders for the three albums were announced on the website Gizzverse. Their 24th studio album, whose name is shortened to PetroDragonic Apocalypse, released on 16 June 2023. On 27 September of the same year, they officially announced their 25th studio album, The Silver Cord, released on 27 October. In July of 2024, they announced their 26th album, Flight b741, released 9 August of that year. On 29 October 2024, the first single for their 27th album Phantom Island would be released, with the album itself releasing on 13 June 2025. Their 28th album was released on 14 August 2026, and is titled Alien Metal. It is a "techno" sound album with heavy use of synths.

== Albums ==
=== Studio albums ===
Title	Details	Peak chart positions									
Title	Details	AUS	BEL (FL)	BEL (WA)	FRA	GER	NLD	SCO	SWI	UK	US
12 Bar Bruise	Released: 7 September 2012; Label: Flightless (FLT001); Formats: CD, LP, cassette, digital	14 (Note: 12 Bar Bruise did not enter the ARIA charts upon release, but did chart when re-released on vinyl in November 2018.)	—	—	—	—	—	—	—	—	—
Eyes Like the Sky (with Broderick Smith)	Released: 22 February 2013; Label: Flightless (FLT005); Formats: CD, LP, digital	10 (Note: Eyes Like the Sky did not enter the ARIA charts upon release, but did chart when re-released on vinyl in November 2018.)	—	—	—	—	—	—	—	—	—
Float Along – Fill Your Lungs	Released: 27 September 2013; Label: Flightless (FLT006), Dot Dash (DASH024CD); Formats: LP, CD, digital	12 (Note: Float Along – Fill Your Lungs did not enter the ARIA charts upon release, but did chart when re-released on vinyl in November 2018.)	—	—	—	—	—	—	—	—	—
Oddments	Released: 7 March 2014; Label: Flightless (FLT009); Formats: CD, LP, digital	13 (Note: Oddments did not enter the ARIA charts upon release, but did chart when re-released on vinyl in November 2018.)	—	—	—	—	—	—	—	—	—
I'm in Your Mind Fuzz	Released: 31 October 2014; Label: Flightless (FLT012), Heavenly (HVNLP109CD); Formats: CD, LP, digital	85	—	—	—	—	—	—	—	— (Note: I'm in Your Mind Fuzz did not enter the UK Albums Chart but peaked at number 23 on the UK Record Store Chart.)	—
Quarters!	Released: 1 May 2015; Label: Flightless (FLT015), Heavenly (HVNLP114); Formats: CD, LP, digital	99	—	—	—	—	—	—	—	— (Note: Quarters! did not enter the UK Albums Chart but peaked at number 28 on the UK Record Store Chart.)	—
Paper Mâché Dream Balloon	Released: 13 November 2015; Label: Flightless (FLT023CD), Heavenly (HVNLP124); Formats: CD, LP, cassette, digital	89	—	—	—	—	—	—	—	— (Note: Paper Mâché Dream Balloon did not enter the UK Albums Chart but peaked at number 26 on the UK Vinyl Album Chart.)	— (Note: Paper Mâché Dream Balloon did not enter the US Billboard 200 but did peak at number 71 on the Top Album Sales chart.)
Nonagon Infinity	Released: 29 April 2016 (Note: As of March 2024, King Gizzard & the Lizard Wizard's official website lists the release date as 29 May. However, Bandcamp and relevant press coverage list the release date as 29 April.); Label: Flightless (FLT025CD), Heavenly (HVNLP127) ATO (AT00301); Formats: CD, LP, digital	19	152	92	—	—	—	—	—	— (Note: Nonagon Infinity did not enter the UK Albums Chart but peaked at number 76 on the UK Album Sales Chart.)	— (Note: Nonagon Infinity did not enter the US Billboard 200 but did peak at number 96 on the Top Album Sales chart.)
Flying Microtonal Banana	Released: 24 February 2017; Label: Flightless, Heavenly, ATO; Formats: CD, LP, digital	2	87	60	—	—	79	66	—	100	170
Murder of the Universe (with Leah Senior)	Released: 23 June 2017; Label: Flightless, Heavenly, ATO; Formats: CD, LP, digital	3	139	115	—	—	108	58	—	94	106
Sketches of Brunswick East (with Mild High Club)	Released: 18 August 2017; Label: Flightless, Heavenly, ATO; Formats: CD, LP, cassette, digital	4	—	183	—	—	—	—	—	—	— (Note: Sketches of Brunswick East did not enter the US Billboard 200 but did peak at number seven on the Heatseekers Albums chart.)
Polygondwanaland	Released: 17 November 2017; Label: Self-released; Formats: Free digital download, LP, CD, cassette, 8-track cartridge, reel-to-reel, lathe cut, Floppy disk (MP3 8 Kbps), MiniDisc, Microcassette	—	—	—	—	—	—	—	—	— (Note: Polygondwanaland did not enter the UK Albums Chart but peaked at number 27 on the UK Record Store Chart.)	— (Note: Polygondwanaland did not enter the US Billboard 200 but did peak at number 17 on the Heatseekers Albums chart.)
Gumboot Soup	Released: 31 December 2017; Label: Flightless; Formats: CD, LP, digital	6	154	—	159	—	—	—	—	— (Note: Gumboot Soup did not enter the UK Albums Chart but peaked at number 61 on the UK Album Sales Chart.)	— (Note: Gumboot Soup did not enter the US Billboard 200 but did peak at number 76 on the Top Album Sales chart.)
Fishing for Fishies	Released: 26 April 2019; Label: Flightless; Formats: CD, LP, digital	4	142	92	178	—	— (Note: Fishing for Fishies did not enter the Dutch Album Top 100, but entered the Dutch Vinyl 33 chart at number 10.)	40	—	89	— (Note: Fishing for Fishies did not enter the US Billboard 200 but did peak at number 34 on the Top Album Sales chart.)
Infest the Rats' Nest	Released: 16 August 2019; Label: Flightless; Formats: CD, LP, digital	2	85	66	—	69	— (Note: Infest the Rats' Nest did not enter the Dutch Album Top 100, but entered the Dutch Vinyl 33 chart at number nine.)	35	—	— (Note: Infest the Rats' Nest did not enter the UK Albums Chart but peaked at number 52 on the UK Album Downloads Chart.)	64
K.G.	Released: 20 November 2020; Label: Flightless; Formats: CD, LP, digital	9	—	76	—	59	— (Note: K.G. did not enter the Dutch Album Top 100, but entered the Dutch Vinyl 33 chart at number 12.)	11	—	80	— (Note: K.G. did not enter the US Billboard 200 but did peak at number 40 on the Top Album Sales chart.)
L.W.	Released: 26 February 2021; Label: Flightless; Formats: CD, LP, digital	4	—	119	—	—	— (Note: L.W. did not enter the Dutch Album Top 100, but entered the Dutch Vinyl 33 chart at number 31.)	12	37	— (Note: L.W. did not enter the UK Albums Chart but peaked at number 50 on the UK Album Downloads Chart.)	— (Note: L.W. did not enter the US Billboard 200 but did peak at number 35 on the Top Album Sales chart.)
Butterfly 3000	Released: 11 June 2021; Label: KGLW; Formats: CD, LP, digital	2	—	114	—	—	—	—	—	— (Note: Butterfly 3000 did not enter the UK Albums Chart but peaked at number 96 on the UK Album Downloads Chart.)	— (Note: Butterfly 3000 did not enter the US Billboard 200 but did peak at number 11 on the Top Album Sales chart.)
Made in Timeland	Released: 5 March 2022; Label: Flightless; Formats: LP, digital	65	—	—	—	—	—	39	—	— (Note: Made in Timeland did not enter the UK Albums Chart but peaked at number 44 on the UK Album Sales Chart.)	— (Note: Made in Timeland did not enter the US Billboard 200, but peaked at number 43 on the Top Album Sales chart.)
Omnium Gatherum	Released: 22 April 2022; Label: KGLW; Formats: 2×LP, digital	4	—	—	—	—	—	—	—	— (Note: Omnium Gatherum did not enter the UK Albums Chart but peaked at number 12 on the UK Album Downloads Chart.)	— (Note: Omnium Gatherum did not enter the US Billboard 200, but peaked at number eight on the Top Album Sales chart.)
Ice, Death, Planets, Lungs, Mushrooms and Lava	Released: 7 October 2022; Label: KGLW; Formats: LP, digital	6	—	—	—	—	—	—	—	— (Note: Ice, Death, Planets, Lungs, Mushrooms and Lava did not enter the UK Albums Chart but peaked at number 66 on the UK Album Downloads Chart.)	— (Note: Ice, Death, Planets, Lungs, Mushrooms and Lava did not enter the US Billboard 200 but did peak at number 93 on the Top Album Sales chart.)
Laminated Denim	Released: 12 October 2022; Label: KGLW; Formats: LP, digital	11	—	—	—	—	—	—	—	—	— (Note: Laminated Denim did not enter the US Billboard 200 but did peak at number 93 on the Top Album Sales chart.)
Changes	Released: 28 October 2022; Label: KGLW; Formats: LP, digital	4	—	—	—	—	—	—	—	— (Note: Changes did not enter the UK Albums Chart but peaked at number 79 on the UK Album Downloads Chart.)	— (Note: Changes did not enter the US Billboard 200 but did peak at number 44 on the Top Album Sales chart.)
PetroDragonic Apocalypse; or, Dawn of Eternal Night: An Annihilation of Planet Earth and the Beginning of Merciless Damnation	Released: 16 June 2023; Label: KGLW; Formats: CD, 2×LP, digital	2	—	195	—	78	— (Note: PetroDragonic Apocalypse; or, Dawn of Eternal Night: An Annihilation of Planet Earth and the Beginning of Merciless Damnation did not enter the Dutch Album Top 100, but entered the Dutch Vinyl 33 chart at number 13.)	53	—	— (Note: PetroDragonic Apocalypse did not enter the UK Albums Chart but peaked at number 36 on the UK Album Downloads Chart.)	85
The Silver Cord	Released: 27 October 2023; Label: KGLW; Formats: LP, digital	5	—	—	—	—	—	—	—	— (Note: The Silver Cord did not enter the UK Albums Chart but peaked at number 30 on the UK Album Downloads Chart.)	—
Flight b741	Released: 9 August 2024; Label: p(doom); Formats: CD, LP, digital, Blu-ray, DVD (Dolby Atmos Mix)	8	—	—	—	—	—	66	—	— (Note: Flight b741 did not enter the UK Albums Chart but peaked at number 25 on the UK Album Sales Chart.)	118
Phantom Island	Released: 13 June 2025; Label: p(doom); Formats: CD, LP, digital, Blu-ray, DVD (Dolby Atmos Mix)	5	188	—	— (Note: Phantom Island did not enter the France Albums Chart but peaked at number 103 on the French Physical Albums Chart.)	—	—	34	—	— (Note: Phantom Island did not enter the UK Albums Chart but peaked at number 33 on the UK Album Sales Chart.)	85
Alien Metal	Released: 13 August 2026; Label: p(doom); Formats: CD, LP, digital, cassette	26	—	—	—	—	—	—	—	—	—
Entropy	To be released: 4 December 2026; Label: p(doom)	To be released									
"—" denotes a recording that did not chart or was not released in that territory.

=== Official remix albums ===
Title	Details	Peak chart positions	
Title	Details	US Dance	US Sales
Butterfly 3001	Released: 21 January 2022; Label: KGLW; Formats: LP, digital	6	41

=== Official live albums ===
Title	Details	Peak chart positions								
Title	Details	AUS	NLD Vinyl	SCO	UK Sales	UK Indie	UK Rock	US Indie	US OST	US Indie
Chunky Shrapnel	Released: 24 April 2020; Label: Flightless; Formats: CD, LP, digital	2	27	38	46	14	6	48	14	11
Live in San Francisco '16	Released: 20 November 2020; Label: Flightless; Formats: CD, LP, digital	—	—	—	— (Note: Live in San Francisco '16 did not enter the UK Album Sales Chart but peaked at number seven on the UK Record Store Chart.)	45	—	—	—	75
"—" denotes a recording that did not chart or was not released in that territory.

=== Bootleg live albums ===
Title	Details	Peak chart positions			
Title	Details	AUS	UK Rec.	UK Indie Brk.	US Current
Live in Paris '19	Released: 10 January 2020; Label: Self-released, Gizz's Picks, Fuzz Club; Formats: Digital (Bandcamp), LP, CD	9	—	—	—
Live in Adelaide '19	Released: 10 January 2020; Label: Self-released, Fuzz Club; Formats: Digital (Bandcamp), LP, CD	6	—	—	—
Live in Brussels '19	Released: 15 January 2020; Label: Self-released, Gizz's Pick, Fuzz Club; Formats: Digital (Bandcamp), LP, CD	34	—	—	—
Live in Asheville '19	Released: 1 October 2020; Label: Self-released, Fuzz Club, Diggers Factory; Formats: Digital (Bandcamp), LP, CD	30	—	—	—
Live in London '19	Released: 25 December 2020; Label: Self-released, Gizz's Picks, Strong Island, Diggers Factory, Fuzz Club; Formats: Digital (Bandcamp), LP, cassette, CD	—	37	13	—
Live in Melbourne '21	Released: 19 March 2021; Label: Self-released, Diggers Factory, Fuzz Club, Audio Vaults, Stolen Body; Formats: Digital (Bandcamp), LP, CD	—	—	—	—
Live in Sydney '21	Released: 30 May 2021; Label: Self-released, Diggers Factory; Formats: Digital (Bandcamp), LP, CD	—	—	—	—
Live in Milwaukee '19	Released: 1 October 2021; Label: Self-released, Diggers Factory; Formats: Digital (Bandcamp), LP, CD	—	—	—	—
Live at Levitation '14	Released: 11 December 2021; Label: Self-released, Diggers Factory, The Reverberation Appreciation Society; Formats: Digital (Bandcamp), LP, CD	—	—	—	—
Live at Levitation '16	Released: 11 December 2021; Label: Self-released, Diggers Factory, The Reverberation Appreciation Society; Formats: Digital (Bandcamp), LP, CD	—	—	—	—
Live in Brisbane '21	Released: 28 January 2022; Label: Self-released; Formats: Digital (Bandcamp), CD	—	—	—	—
Live at Bonnaroo '22	Released: 12 August 2022; Label: Self-released; Formats: Digital (Bandcamp), CD	—	—	—	—
Live at Red Rocks '22	Released: 25 January 2023; Label: Self-released; Formats: Digital (Bandcamp), LP, CD	—	—	—	69
Live in Chicago '23	Released: 31 August 2023; Label: Self-released; Formats: Digital (Bandcamp), LP, CD	—	—	—	—
Live in D.C. '24	Released: 4 September 2024; Label: Self-released; Formats: Digital (Bandcamp)	—	—	—	—
Live in New York City '24 (Night 1)	Released: 4 September 2024; Label: Self-released; Formats: Digital (Bandcamp)	—	—	—	—
Live in New York City '24 (Night 2)	Released: 4 September 2024; Label: Self-released; Formats: Digital (Bandcamp)	—	—	—	—
Live in Boston '24	Released: 4 September 2024; Label: Self-released; Formats: Digital (Bandcamp)	—	—	—	—
Live in Maine '24	Released: 4 September 2024; Label: Self-released; Formats: Digital (Bandcamp)	—	—	—	—
Live in Toronto '24	Released: 4 September 2024; Label: Self-released; Formats: Digital (Bandcamp)	—	—	—	—
Live in Detroit '24	Released: 4 September 2024; Label: Self-released; Formats: Digital (Bandcamp)	—	—	—	—
Live in Cleveland '24	Released: 4 September 2024; Label: Self-released; Formats: Digital (Bandcamp)	—	—	—	—
Live in Kentucky '24	Released: 4 September 2024; Label: Self-released; Formats: Digital (Bandcamp)	—	—	—	—
Live in Philadelphia '24	Released: 4 September 2024; Label: Self-released; Formats: Digital (Bandcamp)	—	—	—	—
Live in Richmond '24	Released: 4 September 2024; Label: Self-released; Formats: Digital (Bandcamp)	—	—	—	—
Live in Asheville '24	Released: 4 September 2024; Label: Self-released; Formats: Digital (Bandcamp)	—	—	—	—
Live in Nashville '24	Released: 4 September 2024; Label: Self-released; Formats: Digital (Bandcamp)	—	—	—	—
Live in Chicago '24	Released: 4 September 2024; Label: Self-released; Formats: Digital (Bandcamp)	—	—	—	—
Live in Minneapolis '24	Released: 6 September 2024; Label: Self-released; Formats: Digital (Bandcamp)	—	—	—	—
Live in Milwaukee '24	Released: 7 September 2024; Label: Self-released; Formats: Digital (Bandcamp)	—	—	—	—
Live in St. Louis '24	Released: 8 September 2024; Label: Self-released; Formats: Digital (Bandcamp)	—	—	—	—
Live in Omaha '24	Released: 10 September 2024; Label: Self-released; Formats: Digital (Bandcamp)	—	—	—	—
Live at Red Rocks '24 (Night 1)	Released: 13 September 2024; Label: Self-released; Formats: Digital (Bandcamp)	—	—	—	—
Live at Red Rocks '24 (Day)	Released: 13 September 2024; Label: Self-released; Formats: Digital (Bandcamp)	—	—	—	—
Live at Red Rocks '24 (Night 2)	Released: 13 September 2024; Label: Self-released; Formats: Digital (Bandcamp)	—	—	—	—
Live in Oregon '24	Released: 15 September 2024; Label: Self-released; Formats: Digital (Bandcamp)	—	—	—	—
Live in Vancouver '24	Released: 15 September 2024; Label: Self-released; Formats: Digital (Bandcamp)	—	—	—	—
Live at the Gorge '24	Released: 17 September 2024; Label: Self-released; Formats: Digital (Bandcamp)	—	—	—	—
Live in Los Angeles '24	Released: 3 November 2024; Label: Self-released; Formats: Digital (Bandcamp)	—	—	—	—
Live in San Diego '24	Released: 3 November 2024; Label: Self-released; Formats: Digital (Bandcamp)	—	—	—	—
Live in Paso Robles '24	Released: 5 November 2024; Label: Self-released; Formats: Digital (Bandcamp)	—	—	—	—
Live in Stanford '24	Released: 10 November 2024; Label: Self-released; Formats: Digital (Bandcamp)	—	—	—	—
Live in San Francisco '24	Released: 11 November 2024; Label: Self-released; Formats: Digital (Bandcamp)	—	—	—	—
Live in Las Vegas '24	Released: 11 November 2024; Label: Self-released; Formats: Digital (Bandcamp)	—	—	—	—
Live in Phoenix '24	Released: 11 November 2024; Label: Self-released; Formats: Digital (Bandcamp)	—	—	—	—
Live in Albuquerque '24	Released: 12 November 2024; Label: Self-released; Formats: Digital (Bandcamp)	—	—	—	—
Live in Oklahoma City '24	Released: 15 November 2024; Label: Self-released; Formats: Digital (Bandcamp)	—	—	—	—
Live in Arkansas '24	Released: 16 November 2024; Label: Self-released; Formats: Digital (Bandcamp)	—	—	—	—
Live in Austin '24	Released: 18 November 2024; Label: Self-released; Formats: Digital (Bandcamp)	—	—	—	—
Live in Houston '24	Released: 20 November 2024; Label: Self-released; Formats: Digital (Bandcamp)	—	—	—	—
Live in New Orleans '24	Released: 20 November 2024; Label: Self-released; Formats: Digital (Bandcamp)	—	—	—	—
Live in Atlanta '24	Released: 24 November 2024; Label: Self-released; Formats: Digital (Bandcamp)	—	—	—	—
Live in St. Augustine '24	Released: 24 November 2024; Label: Self-released; Formats: Digital (Bandcamp)	—	—	—	—
Live in Miami '24	Released: 24 November 2024; Label: Self-released; Formats: Digital (Bandcamp)	—	—	—	—
Live in Lisbon '25	Released: 23 May 2025; Label: Self-released; Formats: Digital (Bandcamp)	—	—	—	—
Live in Barcelona '25	Released: 29 May 2025; Label: Self-released; Formats: Digital (Bandcamp)	—	—	—	—
Live at The Caverns '23	Released: 1 June 2025; Label: Self-released; Formats: Digital (Bandcamp)	—	—	—	—
Live in Lithuania '25	Released: 4 June 2025; Label: Self-released; Formats: Digital (Bandcamp)	—	—	—	—
Live in Athens '25	Released: 10 June 2025; Label: Self-released; Formats: Digital (Bandcamp)	—	—	—	—
Live in Bulgaria '25	Released: 13 June 2025; Label: Self-released; Formats: Digital (Bandcamp)	—	—	—	—
Live in New York City '25 [Rock Night]	Released: 8 August 2025; Label: Self-released; Formats: Digital (Bandcamp)	—	—	—	—
Live at Field of Vision '25	Released: 4 September 2025; Label: Self-released; Formats: Digital (Bandcamp)	—	—	—	—
Live at Red Rocks '23	Released: 19 September 2025; Label: Self-released; Formats: Digital (Bandcamp)	—	—	—	—
Live at Remlinger Farms '23	Released: 24 September 2025; Label: Self-released; Formats: Digital (Bandcamp)	—	—	—	—
Ravin' in Melbourne '25	Released: 17 November 2025; Label: Self-released; Formats: Digital (Bandcamp)	—	—	—	—
Live in Tilburg '25	Released: 17 November 2025; Label: Self-released; Formats: Digital (Bandcamp)	—	—	—	—
Live in Manchester '25	Released: 17 November 2025; Label: Self-released; Formats: Digital (Bandcamp)	—	—	—	—
Live in London '25	Released: 17 November 2025; Label: Self-released; Formats: Digital (Bandcamp)	—	—	—	—
Live in Berlin '25	Released: 17 November 2025; Label: Self-released; Formats: Digital (Bandcamp)	—	—	—	—
Live in Prague '25	Released: 17 November 2025; Label: Self-released; Formats: Digital (Bandcamp)	—	—	—	—
Live in Vienna '25	Released: 24 November 2025; Label: Self-released; Formats: Digital (Bandcamp)	—	—	—	—
Live in Copenhagen '25	Released: 25 November 2025; Label: Self-released; Formats: Digital (Bandcamp)	—	—	—	—
Live in Gothenburg '25	Released: 2 December 2025; Label: Self-released; Formats: Digital (Bandcamp)	—	—	—	—
Live at Field of Vision II '26	Released: 8 October 2026; Label: Self-released; Formats: Digital (Bandcamp)	—	—	—	—
Rockin' in Melbourne '25	Released: 8 October 2026; Label: Self-released; Formats: Digital (Bandcamp)	—	—	—	—
Live in Brisbane '25	Released: 8 October 2026; Label: Self-released; Formats: Digital (Bandcamp)	—	—	—	—
Live in Sydney '25	Released: 8 October 2026; Label: Self-released; Formats: Digital (Bandcamp)	—	—	—	—

=== Bootleg compilation albums ===
Title	Details	Peak chart positions					
Title	Details	AUS	NLD Vinyl	SCO	UK Rec.	UK Indie	US Current
Demos Vol. 1 + Vol. 2 (Music to Kill Bad People To + Music to Eat Bananas To)	Released: 1 October 2020; Label: Self-released; Formats: LP, digital (Bandcamp), CD	14	—	—	—	—	91
Teenage Gizzard	Released: 25 December 2020; Label: Self-released, ATO, Vinyl Religion, Fuzz Club; Formats: Digital (Bandcamp), LP, CD	—	31	53	25	48	38
Demos Vol. 3 + Vol. 4 (Music to Eat Pond Scum To + Music to Die To)	Released: 15 July 2022; Label: Self-released; Formats: Digital (Bandcamp), CD, LP	—	—	—	—	—	—
Demos Vol. 5 + Vol. 6 (Music to Think Existentially To + Music to Burn Money To)	Released: 31 August 2023; Label: Self-released; Formats: Digital (Bandcamp), CD, LP	—	—	—	—	—	—
Demos Vol. 7 + Vol. 8 (Music to Worship Satan To + Music to Change To)	Released: 25 July 2025; Label: Self-released; Formats: Digital (Bandcamp)	—	—	—	—	—	—
Mango Sticky Rice	Released: 2 December 2025; Label: Self-released; Formats: Digital (Bandcamp)	—	—	—	—	—	—
"—" denotes a recording that did not chart or was not released in that territory.

== Extended plays ==
Title	Details	Peak chart positions	
Title	Details	AUS	UK Sales
Anglesea	Released: 18 March 2011; Label: Self-released; Formats: CD, DL	—	—
Willoughby's Beach	Released: 21 October 2011; Label: Self-released; Formats: CD, DL, 10" vinyl, LP, Digital	15	—
Satanic Slumber Party (with Tropical Fuck Storm)	Released: 14 March 2022; Label: Joyful Noise; Formats: Digital, LP	—	77

== Singles ==
=== As lead artist ===
List of singles, with selected chart positions, showing year released and album name
Title	Year	Peak chart positions								Album
Title	Year	AUS Digi.	BEL (FL) Tip	BEL (WA) Tip	MEX Air.	UK Phys.	UK Vinyl	US Alt. Dig.	US Rock Dig.	Album
"Hey There" / "Ants & Bats"	2010	—	—	—	—	—	—	—	—	Non-album single
"Sleep" / "Summer!"	2010	—	—	—	—	—	—	—	—	Non-album single
"Black Tooth" / "Willoughby's Beach"	2011	—	—	—	—	—	—	—	—	Willoughby's Beach
"Bloody Ripper" / "Sam Cherry's Last Shot"	2012	—	—	—	—	—	—	—	—	12 Bar Bruise
"Head On/Pill"	2014	—	—	—	—	4	4	—	—	Float Along – Fill Your Lungs
"Vegemite"	2014	—	—	—	—	—	—	—	—	Oddments
"Cellophane" / "The Wholly Ghost"	2014	—	—	—	—	27	—	—	—	I'm in Your Mind Fuzz
"Slow Jam 1"	2015	—	—	—	—	—	—	—	—	I'm in Your Mind Fuzz
"The River"	2015	—	—	—	—	—	—	—	—	Quarters!
"Paper Mâché Dream Balloon"	2015	—	—	—	—	—	—	—	—	Paper Mâché Dream Balloon
"Trapdoor"	2015	—	—	—	—	—	—	—	—	Paper Mâché Dream Balloon
"Bone"	2016	—	— (Note: "Bone" did not enter the Flanders Ultratop 50, but did appeared on the Ultratip "extra tips" chart.)	—	—	—	—	—	—	Paper Mâché Dream Balloon
"Gamma Knife"	2016	—	—	—	—	—	—	—	—	Nonagon Infinity
"People Vultures"	2016	—	—	—	—	—	—	—	—	Nonagon Infinity
"Mr. Beat"	2016	—	—	—	—	—	—	—	—	Nonagon Infinity
"Rattlesnake"	2016	—	—	—	—	—	—	—	—	Flying Microtonal Banana
"Nuclear Fusion"	2016	—	—	—	41	—	—	—	—	Flying Microtonal Banana
"Sleep Drifter"	2017	—	—	—	—	—	—	—	—	Flying Microtonal Banana
"Han-Tyumi and the Murder of the Universe" (Note: The "Han-Tyumi and the Murder of the Universe" single was released as a suite composed of the individual movements of "Welcome to an Altered Future", "Digital Black", "Han-Tyumi, the Confused Cyborg", "Soy-Protein Munt Machine", "Vomit Coffin", and "Murder of the Universe".)	2017	—	—	—	—	—	—	—	—	Murder of the Universe
"The Lord of Lightning vs Balrog" (Note: The single "The Lord of Lightning vs Balrog" was released as a suite composed of the individual movements of "Some Context", "The Reticent Raconteur", "The Lord of Lightning", "The Balrog", "The Floating Fire", and "The Acrid Corpse".)	2017	—	—	—	—	—	—	—	—	Murder of the Universe
"Invisible Face"	2017	—	—	—	—	—	—	—	—	Nonagon Infinity
"Countdown"	2017	—	—	—	—	—	—	—	—	Sketches of Brunswick East
"Crumbling Castle"	2017	—	—	—	—	—	—	—	—	Polygondwanaland
"All Is Known"	2017	—	—	—	—	—	—	—	—	Gumboot Soup
"Beginner's Luck"	2017	—	—	—	—	—	—	—	—	Gumboot Soup
"Greenhouse Heat Death"	2017	—	—	—	—	—	—	—	—	Gumboot Soup
"The Last Oasis"	2017	—	—	—	—	—	—	—	—	Gumboot Soup
"Rolling Stoned"	2018	—	—	—	—	—	—	—	—	Sketches of Brunswick East
"Cyboogie" / "Acarine"	2019	—	— (Note: "Cyboogie" did not enter the Flanders Ultratop 50, but did appeared on the Ultratip "extra tips" chart.)	—	—	2	2	—	—	Fishing for Fishies
"Fishing for Fishies"	2019	—	33	— (Note: "Bone" did not enter the Wallonie Ultratop 50, but did appeared on the Ultratip "extra tips" chart.)	—	—	—	—	—	Fishing for Fishies
"Boogieman Sam"	2019	—	—	—	—	—	—	—	—	Fishing for Fishies
"Planet B"	2019	—	—	—	—	—	—	—	—	Infest the Rats' Nest
"The Bird Song"	2019	—	—	—	—	—	—	—	—	Fishing for Fishies
"Self-Immolate"	2019	—	—	—	—	—	—	—	—	Infest the Rats' Nest
"Organ Farmer"	2019	—	—	—	—	—	—	—	—	Infest the Rats' Nest
"Honey"	2020	—	—	—	—	—	—	—	—	K.G.
"Some of Us"	2020	—	—	—	—	—	—	—	—	K.G.
"Straws in the Wind"	2020	—	—	—	—	—	—	—	—	K.G.
"Automation"	2020	—	—	—	—	—	—	—	—	K.G.
"Evil Death Roll (Live in San Francisco / 2016)"	2020	—	—	—	—	—	—	—	—	Live in San Francisco '16
"Intrasport"	2020	—	—	—	—	—	—	—	—	K.G.
"If Not Now, Then When?"	2020	—	—	—	—	—	—	—	—	L.W.
"O.N.E."	2021	—	—	—	—	—	—	—	—	L.W.
"Pleura"	2021	—	—	—	—	—	—	—	—	L.W.
"Shanghai Dub by The Scientist"	2021	—	—	—	—	—	—	—	—	Butterfly 3001
"Neu Butterfly 3000 Remix - Peaches"	2021	—	—	—	—	—	—	—	—	Butterfly 3001
"Black Hot Soup (DJ Shadow 'My Own Reality' Re-Write)"	2022	—	—	—	—	—	—	—	—	Butterfly 3001
"The Dripping Tap"	2022	33	—	—	—	—	—	11	11	Omnium Gatherum
"Magenta Mountain"	2022	—	—	—	—	—	—	—	—	Omnium Gatherum
"Kepler-22b"	2022	—	—	—	—	—	—	—	—	Omnium Gatherum
"Gaia" / "Presumptuous"	2022	—	—	—	—	—	—	—	—	Omnium Gatherum
"Ice V"	2022	—	—	—	—	—	—	—	—	Ice, Death, Planets, Lungs, Mushrooms and Lava
"Iron Lung"	2022	—	—	—	—	—	—	—	—	Ice, Death, Planets, Lungs, Mushrooms and Lava
"Hate Dancin'"	2022	—	—	—	—	—	—	—	—	Changes
"No Body" / "Exploding Suns"	2023	—	—	—	—	—	—	—	—	Changes
"Gila Monster"	2023	—	—	—	—	—	—	—	—	PetroDragonic Apocalypse
"Dragon"	2023	—	—	—	—	—	—	—	—	PetroDragonic Apocalypse
"Supercell" / "Converge"	2023	—	—	—	—	—	—	—	—	PetroDragonic Apocalypse
"Theia" / "The Silver Cord" / "Set"	2023	—	—	—	—	—	—	—	—	The Silver Cord
"Swan Song" / "Extinction"	2024	—	—	—	—	—	—	—	—	The Silver Cord
"Le Risque"	2024	—	—	—	—	—	—	—	—	Flight b741
"Hog Calling Contest"	2024	—	—	—	—	—	—	—	—	Flight b741
"Field of Vision"	2024	—	—	—	—	—	—	—	—	Flight b741
"Set" / "Gilgamesh"	2024	—	—	—	—	—	—	—	—	The Silver Cord
"Raw Feel" / "Flight b741"	2024	—	—	—	—	—	—	—	—	Flight b741
"Phantom Island"	2024	—	—	—	—	—	—	—	—	Phantom Island
"Antarctica" / "Sad Pilot"	2024	—	—	—	—	—	—	—	—	Flight b741
"Deadstick"	2025	—	—	—	—	—	—	—	—	Phantom Island
"Grow Wings and Fly"	2025	—	—	—	—	—	—	—	—	Phantom Island
"Level 5"	2026	—	—	—	—	—	—	—	—	Alien Metal
"Alien Metal"	2026	—	—	—	—	—	—	—	—	Alien Metal
"Kill for the Steel"	2026	—	—	—	—	—	—	—	—	Alien Metal
"—" denotes a recording that did not chart or was not released in that territory.

=== As featured artist ===
List of singles as featured artist, with selected chart positions, showing year released and album name
Title	Year	Peak chart positions										Album
Title	Year	AUS	AUT	GER	IRE	NLD	NOR	SWE	SWI	UK	US	Album
"Flower in a Hurricane" (Justice featuring Tame Impala, SZA and King Gizzard & the Lizard Wizard)	2026	17	17	7	16	18	33	43	5	9	62	Grand Theft Auto VI: The Album

== Music videos ==
List of music videos, showing year released and director
Title	Year	Director(s)	Ref.
"Trench Foot"	2011	Stu Mackenzie	
"Black Tooth"	2011	Eric Moore	
"Dead-Beat"	2011	Syd Row	
"Danger $$$"	2011	Careful Stranger(s) Productions	
"Bloody Ripper"	2012	Jason Galea; Greg Holden	
"Sam Cherry's Last Shot"	2012	Jason Galea; Greg Holden	
"Muckraker"	2012	Jason Galea; Greg Holden	
"Nein"	2012	Jason Galea; Greg Holden	
"Head On/Pill"	2013	Syd Row	
"30 Past 7"	2013	Jason Galea	
"I'm Not a Man Unless I Have a Woman"	2013	Jason Galea	
"Vegemite"	2014	Jason Galea	
"Hot Wax"	2014	Jason Galea	
"Cellophane"	2014	Jason Galea	
"Satan Speeds Up"	2014	Jason Galea; Peter Burr	
"Slow Jam 1"	2015	Jamie Wdziekonski; Jason Galea	
"The River"	2015	Jason Galea	
"Trapdoor"	2015	Jason Galea	
"Gamma Knife"	2016	Danny Cohen; Jason Galea	
"People-Vultures"	2016	Danny Cohen; Jason Galea	
"Robot Stop"	2016	Jason Galea	
"Rattlesnake"	2016	Jason Galea	
"Han-Tyumi & the Murder of the Universe"	2017	Jason Galea	
"The Lord of Lightning vs Balrog"	2017	Jason Galea; Ben Jones	
"Invisible Face"	2017	Jason Galea; Joel Melrose	
"Countdown"	2017	Jason Galea	
"Crumbling Castle"	2017	Jason Galea	
"Cyboogie"	2019	Jason Galea	
"Fishing For Fishies"	2019	Jason Galea; John Angus Stewart	
"Planet B"	2019	John Angus Stewart	
"Self-Immolate"	2019	John Angus Stewart	
"Organ Farmer"	2019	John Angus Stewart	
"Honey"	2020	John Angus Stewart	
"Some of Us"	2020	John Angus Stewart	
"Straws in the Wind"	2020	Jason Galea; Ambrose Kenny-Smith	
"Automation"	2020	Various (Note: The band released the raw video files of the music video for fans to edit and make a version of their own.)	
"Intrasport"	2020	John Angus Stewart	
"If Not Now, Then When?"	2020	Dr. D Foothead	
"O.N.E."	2021	Alex McLaren	
"Pleura"	2021	John Angus Stewart	
"Yours"	2021	John Angus Stewart	
"Shanghai"	2021	Amanda Bonaiuto	
"Dreams"	2021	Jamie Wolfe	
"Blue Morpho"	2021	Jamie Wolfe	
"Interior People"	2021	Ivan Dixon	
"Catching Smoke"	2021	Danny Cohen	
"2.02 Killer Year"	2021	Sophie Koko	
"Black Hot Soup"	2021	Guy Tyzack	
"Ya Love"	2021	Jason Galea	
"Butterfly 3000"	2021	Jason Galea	
"Black Hot Soup (DJ Shadow “My Own Reality” Re-Write)"	2022	John Angus Stewart	
"Satanic Slumber Party Part 2 (Midnight In Sodom)" (with Tropical Fuck Storm)	2022	Nina Renee; Tropical Fuck Storm	
"Magenta Mountain (Live From Timeland)"	2022	John Angus Stewart	
"Kepler-22b"	2022	Alex McLaren; Sean McAnulty	
"Blame It On The Weather (Live at County Line)"	2022	Jason Galea	
"Ice V"	2022	Danny Cohen	
"Iron Lung"	2022	SPOD	
"Timeland"	2022	Jason Galea	
"Smoke & Mirrors"	2022	Jason Galea	
"The Land Before Timeland"	2022	Jason Galea	
"Hypertension"	2022	Jason Galea	
"Hate Dancin'"	2022	John Angus Stewart	
"Astroturf"	2023	Jason Galea	
"Gila Monster"	2023	SPOD	
"Dragon"	2023	Jason Galea	
"Theia" / "The Silver Cord" / "Set"	2023	Jason Galea	
"Le Risque"	2024	Guy Tyzack	
"Deadstick"	2025	Guy Tyzack	
"Grow Wings and Fly"	2025	Hayden Somerville	
"Level 5"	2026	Hayden Somerville	

== Other appearances ==
Year	Album	Song	Ref.
2012	New Centre Of The Universe, Vol. 1	"Trench Foot"	
2012	Nuggets: Antipodean Interpolations Of The First Psychedelic Era	"Open My Eyes"	
2015	Rough Trade Shops: Heavenly 25	"The River (Edit)"	
2022	Good Music To Ensure Safe Abortion Access To All	"Ice V (Demo)"	
2023	Woman Life Freedom – Music For Iran, Volume 2	"Real's Not Real (Demo)"	
2024	Cardinals At The Window – A Benefit for Flood Relief in Western North Carolina	"Change (Demo 4)"	
2025	Super Bloom: A Benefit for Fire Relief in Los Angeles	"Exploding Suns (Demo 2)"	
2025	Good Music to Lift Los Angeles	"Exploding Suns (Demo 1)"	
2026	Forever Young by War Child Australia	"Phantom Island"	
