= Demos Vol. 1 + Vol. 2 =

Compilation album by King Gizzard & the Lizard Wizard
- Released: 29 September 2020
- Recorded: 2011–2020
- Genre: Psychedelic rock; garage rock
- Length: 90:00
- Label: Self-released; Various
- Producer: Stu Mackenzie

King Gizzard & the Lizard Wizard chronology
Chunky Shrapnel (2020)	Demos Vol. 1 + Vol. 2 (2020)	Live in Asheville '19 (2020)

Demos Vol. 1 + Vol. 2 is a compilation album released by King Gizzard & the Lizard Wizard on 29 September 2020, exclusively through Bandcamp and vinyl. It compiles demos and unreleased tracks ranging from the band's entire career. It was originally released as two separate albums (Vol. 1 Music to Kill Bad People To and Vol. 2 Music to Eat Bananas To) but was eventually compiled into one.

== Track listing ==
Vol. 1: Music to Kill Bad People To
No.	Title	Length
1.	"Music to Kill Bad People To"	4:19
2.	"Evil Death Roll (Demo)"	4:32
3.	"Dirt (Demo)"	3:16
4.	"Bit Bit Bit Bit Bit Bit Bit"	2:11
5.	"Sketches of Brunswick East (Demo)"	4:30
6.	"Demo No. 79"	2:07
7.	"Planet B (Demo)"	3:57
8.	"The Bird Song (Demo 1)"	3:15
9.	"Muddy Water (Demo)"	2:01
10.	"Mars for the Rich (Demo 1)"	2:04
11.	"Footy Footy (Demo)"	1:38
12.	"Stevie Ray Horn"	3:19
13.	"Automation (Demo)"	2:56
14.	"Fishing for Fishies (Demo)"	4:23
Total length:		44:28

Vol. 2: Music to Eat Bananas To
No.	Title	Length
1.	"Music to Eat Bananas To"	3:12
2.	"The Spider and Me (Demo)"	2:43
3.	"Most of What I Like (Demo)"	4:04
4.	"9 Tet"	2:17
5.	"Demo No. 67"	2:14
6.	"Danger $$$ (Demo)"	1:35
7.	"Horology (Demo)"	1:35
8.	"Honey (Demo 1)"	4:27
9.	"The 10th Boogie"	3:58
10.	"Let It Bleed (Demo)"	2:37
11.	"Tezeta (Demo)"	2:13
12.	"Scared of Christmas"	2:12
13.	"Sleepwalker (Demo)"	2:40
14.	"Straws in the Wind (Demo)"	11:20
Total length:		45:32

== Charts ==
Chart performance for Demos Vol. 1 + Vol. 2
Chart (2020)	Peak position
Australian Albums (ARIA)	14
US Top Current Albums (Billboard)	91
