= Live in London '19 =

Live In London'19

Live album by King Gizzard & the Lizard Wizard
- Released: 24 December 2020
- Recorded: 5 October 2019
- Genres: Psychedelic rock; thrash rock
- Length: 89:52
- Labels: Self-released; Various
- Producer: Stu Mackenzie

King Gizzard & the Lizard Wizard chronology
Teenage Gizzard (2020)	Live In London'19 (2020)	L.W. (2020)

Live in London '19 is a live album released by Australian rock band King Gizzard and the Lizard Wizard, recorded during their then largest show at Alexandra Palace, London, England on 5 October 2019. The album was released alongside Teenage Gizzard during a hiatus between albums.

== Recordings ==
Released alongside Teenage Gizzard, the concert was part of a promotion of the then newly released album Infest the Rats' Nest. The album was released on the King Gizzard bandcamp for free for anyone to download as part of the band's official bootlegger program. Most of the album consists of Infest the Rats' Nest more heavier thrash metal songs as well as the "Mind Fuzz Suite" consisting of I'm In your Mind, I'm Not In Your Mind, and Cellophane.

== Reception ==
The concert that was recorded to make the album was the largest concert in King Gizzard's history at the time, selling out the 10,000 person capacity Alexandra Palace. Parts of the concert were also used in the Chunky Shrapnel album.

== Track listing ==
The albums were recorded by Sam Joseph, Stacey Wilson, and Gaspard De Meulemeester with cover art by Jason Galea.

Live in London '19 track listing
No.	Title	Length
1.	"Evil Star"	2:12
2.	"Self-Immolate"	5:54
3.	"Mars for the Rich"	4:03
4.	"I'm in Your Mind"	3:37
5.	"I'm Not in Your Mind"	1:58
6.	"Cellophane"	3:36
7.	"The Great Chain of Being"	4:38
8.	"Plastic Boogie"	3:37
9.	"Crumbling Castle"	10:22
10.	"This Thing"	6:19
11.	"Boogieman Sam"	6:15
12.	"Mr Beat"	4:39
13.	"Evil Death Roll"	8:07
14.	"Venusian 2"	3:59
15.	"Planet B"	4:21
16.	"Rattlesnake"	6:49
17.	"Float Along – Fill Your Lungs"	9:26
Total length:		89:52

== Personnel ==
- Stu Mackenzie – lead vocals, guitar, keyboards
- Ambroses Kenny-Smith – vocals, harmonica, percussion, synthesizers
- Joey Walker – guitar, vocals, keyboards
- Cook Craig – guitar, keyboards
- Lucas Harwood – bass
- Michael Cavanagh – drums
- Eric Moore – drums
