= Live at Red Rocks '22 =

Live album by King Gizzard & the Lizard Wizard
- Released: 24 January 2023
- Recorded: 10 October – 2 November 2022
- Venues: Red Rocks Amphitheater, Morrison, Colorado
- Length: 512:33
- Label: Self-released

King Gizzard & the Lizard Wizard chronology
Changes (2022)	Live at Red Rocks '22 (2023)	PetroDragonic Apocalypse (2023)

Live at Red Rocks '22 is a live album by Australian rock band King Gizzard & the Lizard Wizard, released digitally on 24 January 2023 on Bandcamp. It compiles the band's three three-hour marathon shows at the Red Rocks Amphitheatre in Morrison, Colorado throughout late 2022. The album overall contains 86 tracks from throughout the band's entire career, clocking in at eight and a half hours, with each set being around three hours.

Similar to other live and compilation albums by the band, it was released officially through their bootlegging platform with an encouragement to be pressed by independent labels.

Folk musician Leah Senior also makes a guest appearance on the record; she was featured heavily on the band's 2017 studio albums Murder of the Universe and Polygondwanaland

== Track listing ==
October 10, 2022
No.	Title	From	Length
1.	"Mars for the Rich"	Infest the Rats' Nest, 2019	5:23
2.	"Hell"	Infest the Rats' Nest	3:39
3.	"Magenta Mountain"	Omnium Gatherum, 2022	9:40
4.	"Inner Cell"	Polygondwanaland, 2017	4:12
5.	"Loyalty"	Polygondwanaland	3:40
6.	"Horology"	Polygondwanaland	2:34
7.	"O.N.E."	L.W., 2021	4:50
8.	"Nuclear Fusion"	Flying Microtonal Banana, 2017	5:42
9.	"All Is Known"	Gumboot Soup, 2017	3:33
10.	"Straws in the Wind"	K.G., 2020	11:53
11.	"The Garden Goblin"	Omnium Gatherum	3:25
12.	"The River"	Quarters!, 2015	19:13
13.	"Magma"	Ice, Death, Planets, Lungs, Mushrooms and Lava, 2022	10:38
14.	"Rattlesnake"	Flying Microtonal Banana	14:41
15.	"Automation"	K.G.	3:34
16.	"Honey"	K.G.	8:20
17.	"Sleep Drifter"	Flying Microtonal Banana	3:05
18.	"Ataraxia"	L.W.	5:27
19.	"Evil Death Roll"	Nonagon Infinity, 2016	10:42
20.	"Ice V"	Ice, Death, Planets, Lungs, Mushrooms and Lava	10:26
21.	"The Reticent Raconteur" (with Leah Senior)	Murder of the Universe, 2017	1:55
22.	"The Lord of Lightning" (with Leah Senior)	Murder of the Universe	5:36
23.	"The Balrog" (with Leah Senior)	Murder of the Universe	5:26
24.	"Trapdoor"	Paper Mâché Dream Balloon, 2015	4:15
25.	"Hot Water"	I'm in Your Mind Fuzz, 2014	7:35
26.	"The Grim Reaper"	Omnium Gatherum	4:42
27.	"Planet B"	Infest the Rats' Nest	4:34

October 11, 2022
No.	Title	From	Length
28.	"The Dripping Tap"	Omnium Gatherum	16:22
29.	"Gaia"	Omnium Gatherum	10:03
30.	"Predator X"	Omnium Gatherum	4:07
31.	"Organ Farmer"	Infest the Rats' Nest	2:59
32.	"Pleura"	L.W.	4:21
33.	"Oddlife"	K.G.	5:30
34.	"Doom City"	Flying Microtonal Banana	2:45
35.	"K.G.L.W."	L.W.	10:07
36.	"Boogieman Sam"	Fishing for Fishies, 2019	11:32
37.	"Sleepwalker"	Oddments, 2014	4:36
38.	"Sea of Trees"	12 Bar Bruise, 2012	9:52
39.	"The Bitter Boogie"	Paper Mâché Dream Balloon	10:41
40.	"Perihelion"	Infest the Rats' Nest	2:56
41.	"I'm in Your Mind"	I'm in Your Mind Fuzz	3:35
42.	"I'm Not in Your Mind"	I'm in Your Mind Fuzz	3:11
43.	"Cellophane"	I'm in Your Mind Fuzz	3:06
44.	"I'm in Your Mind Fuzz"	I'm in Your Mind Fuzz	2:51
45.	"Tezeta"	Sketches of Brunswick East, 2017	4:38
46.	"A New World" (with Leah Senior)	Murder of the Universe	1:08
47.	"Altered Beast I" (with Leah Senior)	Murder of the Universe	2:21
48.	"Alter Me I" (with Leah Senior)	Murder of the Universe	0:54
49.	"Altered Beast II" (with Leah Senior)	Murder of the Universe	4:34
50.	"Alter Me II" (with Leah Senior)	Murder of the Universe	0:53
51.	"Altered Beast III" (with Leah Senior)	Murder of the Universe	2:54
52.	"Ambergris"	Omnium Gatherum	5:23
53.	"Muddy Water"	Gumboot Soup	6:54
54.	"Iron Lung"	Ice, Death, Planets, Lungs, Mushrooms and Lava	10:16
55.	"Robot Stop"	Nonagon Infinity	7:19
56.	"Gamma Knife"	Nonagon Infinity	5:01
57.	"People-Vultures"	Nonagon Infinity	5:46
58.	"Mr. Beat"	Nonagon Infinity	6:59

November 2, 2022
No.	Title	From	Length
59.	"Digital Black"	Murder of the Universe	2:48
60.	"Han-Tyumi, the Confused Cyborg"	Murder of the Universe	2:30
61.	"Soy Protein Munt Machine"	Murder of the Universe	0:29
62.	"Vomit Coffin"	Murder of the Universe	2:09
63.	"Murder of the Universe"	Murder of the Universe	5:10
64.	"Blame It on the Weather"	Omnium Gatherum	3:14
65.	"Work This Time"	Oddments	8:25
66.	"Lava"	Ice, Death, Planets, Lungs, Mushrooms and Lava	8:25
67.	"Cut Throat Boogie"	12 Bar Bruise	3:01
68.	"Wah Wah"	Nonagon Infinity	5:49
69.	"Road Train"	Nonagon Infinity	3:17
70.	"Sadie Sorceress"	Omnium Gatherum	4:32
71.	"Self-Immolate"	Infest the Rats' Nest	6:42
72.	"Her and I (Slow Jam II)"	I'm in Your Mind Fuzz	18:23
73.	"Hot Wax"	Oddments	4:22
74.	"Crumbling Castle"	Polygondwanaland	9:08
75.	"The Fourth Colour"	Polygondwanaland	3:44
76.	"Head On/Pill"	Float Along - Fill Your Lungs, 2013	13:41
77.	"Am I In Heaven?"	I'm in Your Mind Fuzz	9:31
78.	"Venusian 1"	Infest the Rats' Nest	3:16
79.	"Venusian 2"	Infest the Rats' Nest	4:28
80.	"Billabong Valley"	Flying Microtonal Banana	5:43
81.	"Minimum Brain Size"	K.G.	4:16
82.	"Static Electricity"	L.W.	8:00
83.	"Let Me Mend the Past"	Float Along - Fill Your Lungs	3:16
84.	"Alter Me III" (with Leah Senior)	Murder of the Universe	0:50
85.	"Altered Beast IV" (with Leah Senior)	Murder of the Universe	6:05
86.	"Float Along - Fill Your Lungs"	Float Along - Fill Your Lungs	9:14

== Personnel ==
King Gizzard & the Lizard Wizard

- Stu Mackenzie – guitars, vocals, flute, keyboard, mixing
- Cook Craig – guitars, keyboard, vocals, synthesizer
- Ambrose Kenny-Smith – harmonica, keyboard, vocals, saxophone, percussion
- Lucas Harwood – bass
- Joey Walker – guitars, vocals, synthesizer
- Michael Cavanagh – drums

Other musicians

- Leah Senior – spoken word on tracks 21–23, 46–51, and 84–85

Technical

- Sam Joseph – recording
- Nico Wilson – recording
- Gaspard Demulemeester – recording
- Gabe Nardin – recording

Design

- Jason Galea – cover design
- Maclay Heriot – photography

== Charts ==
Chart performance for Live at Red Rocks '22
Chart (2023)	Peak position
US Top Current Albums (Billboard)	69
