= Ad Libitum (disambiguation) =

Ad libitum, often shortened to "ad lib", denotes improvisation in various performing arts.

Ad Libitum may refer to:

- Ad Libitum Corporation, a 2020 Russian thriller film
- Productions Ad Libitum, a Canadian record label founded by Bernard Lachance
- Ensemble Ad Libitum, a musical ensemble, a music band founded by Wellington E. Alves
- Ad Libitum, a 2000 album by Bernard Lachance
- Ad Libitum, a 2004 album by Bruno Sanfilippo
- Ad Libitum, a club at the Philippine Science High School – Northern Mindanao Campus in Lanao del Norte
- Ad Libitum, a fictional organization from the role-playing game Tales of the World: Radiant Mythology

== See also ==
- Ad lib (disambiguation)
- Ad (disambiguation)
