= Ad lib (disambiguation) =

Ad libitum, often shortened to "ad lib", denotes improvisation in various performing arts.

Ad Lib may also refer to:

- Ad Lib (album), a 1959 album by Jimmy Giuffre
- Ad Lib, Inc., a sound card manufacturer
  - AdLib Music Synthesizer Card, the AdLib sound card and AdLib sound card standard from Ad Lib, Inc.
- Ad Lib (typeface), a typeface by Freeman Craw
- The Ad Libs, an American band
- Ad Lib (TV series), American music television series
- Ad Lib (comedy show), a British comedy show
- Ad Lib Club, Soho, London, England, UK; a nightclub

== See also ==
- Ad Libitum (disambiguation)
- Ad (disambiguation)
- Lib (disambiguation)
