= LIB =

LIB may refer to:

== Places ==
- Lebanon, by former IOC country code (1964–2016; now LBN)
- Libya, by UNDP country code

== Computing and electronics ==
- Label Information Base, a software table in networking routers that support Multiprotocol Label Switching (MPLS)
- Library (computing), a collection of programming resources
- Lithium-ion battery, a type of electricity storage

== Other uses ==
- Movement for Integration and Unification (Albanian: Lëvizja Kombëtare për Integrim dhe Bashkim), a political party in Kosovo
- Lightning in a Bottle, a music festival in Central Valley region, California, US
- Long Island Bus, former name of a transit service in Nassau County, New York, US
- International School of Boston (French: Lycée International de Boston), a bilingual private school in Cambridge, Massachusetts, US

== See also ==
- Lib (disambiguation)
- Let It Be (disambiguation), various musical and cinematic works
- Let It Bleed (disambiguation), various works
