= Chunky Shrapnel =

2020 psychedelic rock album

- Theatrical release poster
- Directed by: John Angus Stewart
- Written by: John Angus Stewart; King Gizzard & the Lizard Wizard
- Produced by: Max Coles
- Starring: Stu Mackenzie; Ambrose Kenny-Smith; Joey Walker; Cook Craig; Lucas Harwood; Michael Cavanagh; Eric Moore
- Cinematography: John Angus Stewart
- Edited by: John Angus Stewart
- Music by: Stu Mackenzie
- Release date: 17 April 2020
- Running time: 98 minutes
- Country: Australia

Chunky Shrapnel is a 2020 concert film and live album by Australian psychedelic rock band King Gizzard & the Lizard Wizard. The film follows the band on their 2019 tour of Europe in support of the album Infest the Rats' Nest.

The concert film was first announced by the band on social media on 6 March 2020 and was set to be screened at the Astor Theatre, Melbourne on 3 and 4 April. However, because of the COVID-19 pandemic, the original screenings were cancelled. Instead, the film was digitally premiered on Vimeo on-demand for 24 hours on 17 April 2020, and again on 24 April 2020 (due to popular demand) and was then later given a theatrical premier at the Astor Theatre, Melbourne on 8 May 2021. The live double album of the same name was released alongside the film's second screening.

The film was described as "literally bringing the audience onto the stage" and a "uniquely immersive experience never before captured on film. A musical road movie dipped in turpentine." The film was shot and directed by John Angus Stewart and also features an "eerie" score by band frontman Stu Mackenzie.

== Soundtrack live album ==
Chunky Shrapnel

Live album by King Gizzard & the Lizard Wizard
- Released: 24 April 2020
- Length: 76:13
- Label: Flightless

King Gizzard & the Lizard Wizard chronology
Live in Brussels '19 (2020)	Chunky Shrapnel (2020)	Demos Vol. 1 + Vol. 2 (2020)

A live double album was released in tandem with the second Vimeo premiere of the film on 24 April 2020. It is the fourth live album by the band.

The album features all full song performances from the film, including transitions between live songs, along with sections of frontman Stu Mackenzie's score for the film in the form of the tracks "Anamnesis", "Evil Star" and "Quarantine".

=== Track listing ===
No.	Title	Live date, location	Length
1.	"Evil Star"		2:09
2.	"The River"	13 October 2019, Esch-sur-Alzette, Luxembourg	9:38
3.	"Wah Wah"	18 October 2019, Madrid, Spain	3:24
4.	"Road Train"	3 October 2019, Manchester, England	3:39
5.	"Murder of the Universe"	7 October 2019, Utrecht, Netherlands	5:04
6.	"Quarantine"		2:00
7.	"Planet B"	5 October 2019, London	6:02
8.	"Parking"	8 October 2019, Brussels, Belgium	2:02
9.	"Venusian 2"	15 October 2019, Milan, Italy	3:11
10.	"Hell"	15 October 2019, Milan	3:37
11.	"Let Me Mend the Past"	18 October 2019, Madrid	2:58
12.	"Anamnesis"		3:10
13.	"Inner Cell"	6 October 2019, Utrecht	3:49
14.	"Loyalty"	6 October 2019, Utrecht	3:52
15.	"Horology"	6 October 2019, Utrecht	2:35
16.	"A Brief History of Planet Earth"	5 October 19, London / 12 October 2019, Berlin, Germany / 7 October 2019, Utrecht / 19 October 2019, Barcelona, Spain	19:03
Total length:			76:13

Vinyl release

- Side A: tracks 1–4
- Side B: tracks 5–10
- Side C: tracks 11–15
- Side D: track 16

Chart

Chart performance of Chunky Shrapnel
Chart (2020)	Peak position
Australian Albums (ARIA)	2
Belgian Albums (Ultratop Flanders)	118
US Top Album Sales (Billboard)	11
US Independent Albums (Billboard)	47
US Soundtrack Albums (Billboard)	14
