= Hey There / Ants & Bats =

Single by King Gizzard & the Lizard Wizard

from the album Teenage Gizzard
- A-side: "Hey There"
- B-side: "Ants & Bats"
- Released: 22 November 2010
- Genre: Psychedelic rock
- Length: 7:01: 3:50 ("Hey There"); 3:11 ("Ants & Bats")
- Label: Self-released
- Songwriter: Stu Mackenzie
- Producer: Stu Mackenzie

King Gizzard & the Lizard Wizard singles chronology
"Hey There / Ants & Bats" (2010)	"Sleep / Summer!" (2010)

"Hey There / Ants & Bats" was the debut single released by Australian rock band King Gizzard and the Lizard Wizard in 2010. Consisting of two songs, the A-side "Hey There" and the B-side "Ants & Bats".

== Composition ==
"Hey There" was described as having "simplistic lyrics" and a "groovy garage rock composition" while Ants & Bats was described as having "a descending chromatic bass line similar to Pink Floyd’s 1973 hit 'Money'".

== Release ==
The single was released on CD with a fold out sleeve. The single was released on SoundCloud on October 19th, 2010, however, the band refused to release the song officially though they had added it to the ASCAP ACE Repertory. The CD singles where exclusively produced for the personal friends of KGLW band mates and never saw wide circulation.

== Legacy ==
As the first ever King Gizzard and the Lizard Wizard song, and due to the low number of copies produced, Hey There / Ants & Bats became a highly sought after piece of King Gizzard physical media. The most well known performance of the single came in the form of the band's 2010 RMIT University final, where they performed the song live to their professor and classmates. King Gizzard had been formed for a school project, emerging from jam sessions in an off-campus apartment co-leased by various Melbourne based bans. The professor has gone on to say, in regards to Stu Mackenzie and the group passing the project that “Stu did very well from memory!! I remember thinking these guys are really good… my current students worship the gizz and i get much cred from saying they were in my class!!” The song, as well as most of the band's work before their EP Willoughby's Beach was presumed lost by the King Gizzard fanbase. However, on December 14, 2020, the band announced that it was seeking the individuals who had received a CD of the single to produce high quality FLACs. These FLACs were included in the 2021 release of Teenage Gizzard the first time that the recording was released digitally.
