= Gamma Knife (song) =

Single by King Gizzard & the Lizard Wizard

from the album Nonagon Infinity
- Released: 9 March 2016
- Studio: Daptone Studios, Brooklyn, New York
- Genre: Psychedelic rock; heavy metal; garage rock
- Length: 4:21
- Label: Heavenly
- Songwriter: Stu Mackenzie
- Producer: Stu Mackenzie

King Gizzard & the Lizard Wizard singles chronology
"Bone" (2016)	"Gamma Knife" (2016)	"People-Vultures" (2016)

Music video
- "Gamma Knife" on YouTube

"Gamma Knife" is a song by the Australian rock band King Gizzard & the Lizard Wizard, released on 9 March 2016 as the lead single for the band's eighth studio album Nonagon Infinity. The song gets its name from Gamma Knife surgery, a type of radiosurgery used to treat brain tumors by administering high-intensity gamma radiation therapy in a manner that concentrates the radiation over a small volume.

The song is one of the band's most played live and is featured on live albums such as Live in San Francisco '16, Live in Brussels '19, and Live at Red Rocks '22.

== Composition ==
"Gamma Knife" is a fast-paced rock song described by Uncut as having "hard-charging guitars, liberal use of effects pedals and a thrillingly frantic finale." The song alternates between 11/8 and 12/8 time. Guitarist Joey Walker has said it and "Robot Stop" were the first time the band had used odd time signatures "in a way that was at the core of what the album felt like, or was a thing that we were building the album around."

The song contains a drum solo in 11/8 time. Frontman Stu Mackenzie recounted drummer Michael Cavanagh's hesitancy to play the solo: "[He] is a brilliant drummer, but he's very modest. He's not an ego drummer who wants to do a big solo. [...] I think when this song came around, it's got that kind of like — maybe 11/8 or a bar of six and a bar of five in a row? — so, I think he had this thing where this guitar thing was happening where he could do like a drum solo or drum break that wasn't really self-indulgent. It took a bit of convincing, which I guess is a testament to his low ego."

== Critical reception ==
"Gamma Knife" has received positive reception and is considered a highlight among the band's discography. Consequence named it one of the band's best, saying "It's a major reason for why many fans consider Nonagon Infinity to be King Gizzard's best record. With its feisty momentum, trippy timbres, and raucous yet welcoming vocals, Gamma Knife strikes a fine balance between catchy accessibility and uninhibited trickiness. The multilayered multicultural breakdown near the end is downright hypnotic, too, bolstering the track as a classic not only for the band but for psychedelic garage rock as a whole."

The song landed at 61 on Triple J's Hottest 100 list of 2016. It was also shortlisted for Song of the Year at the APRA Music Awards of 2017.

In a 2017 interview with Triple J, director Edgar Wright named the track as his "standout" favourite from Nonagon Infinity, saying that he wanted to create a sequel to Baby Driver just to use the song in a car chase.

== Personnel ==
Credits taken from Apple Music.

King Gizzard & the Lizard Wizard

- Stu Mackenzie – vocals, synthesizer, electric guitar
- Ambrose Kenny-Smith – harmonica
- Cook Craig – synthesizer, electric guitar
- Lucas Skinner – bass
- Joey Walker – synthesizer, electric guitar
- Michael Cavanagh – drums
- Eric Moore – drums

== Use in other media ==
"Gamma Knife" has appeared in television shows such as Marvel's Runaways, The Rookie: Feds, and My Dad the Bounty Hunter.
