= Live in San Francisco '16 =

Live album by King Gizzard & the Lizard Wizard
- Released: 20 November 2020
- Recorded: 25 May 2016
- Venue: The Independent
- Length: 80:13
- Label: ATO
- Producer: Stu Mackenzie

King Gizzard & the Lizard Wizard chronology
Live in Asheville '19 (2020)	Live in San Francisco '16 (2020)	K.G. (2020)

Live in San Francisco '16 is a live album by Australian psychedelic rock band King Gizzard & the Lizard Wizard. The album was released on double vinyl and digital via Bandcamp on 20 November 2020. An accompanying concert film was also released, which premiered on Vimeo on 18 November 2020, and was later released on YouTube.

== Information ==
The album features a set by the band performed at The Independent on May 25, 2016, in San Francisco, California, US.

== Track listing ==
All tracks are written by Stu Mackenzie, except "Hot Water" by Joey Walker and Mackenzie.

No.	Title	Studio release	Length
1.	"Robot Stop"	Nonagon Infinity (2016)	4:21
2.	"Hot Water"	I'm in Your Mind Fuzz (2014)	3:40
3.	"Big Fig Wasp"	Nonagon Infinity	5:11
4.	"Gamma Knife"	Nonagon Infinity	4:01
5.	"People-Vultures"	Nonagon Infinity	5:21
6.	"Trapdoor"	Paper Mâché Dream Balloon (2015)	3:22
7.	"I'm in Your Mind"	I'm in Your Mind Fuzz	3:21
8.	"I'm Not in Your Mind"	I'm in Your Mind Fuzz	3:22
9.	"Cellophane"	I'm in Your Mind Fuzz	2:57
10.	"I'm in Your Mind Fuzz"	I'm in Your Mind Fuzz	2:58
11.	"The River"	Quarters! (2015)	10:57
12.	"Evil Death Roll"	Nonagon Infinity	8:12
13.	"Head On/Pill"	Float Along - Fill Your Lungs (2013)	22:30
Total length:			80:13

Vinyl release

- Side A: tracks 1–5
- Side B: tracks 6–10
- Side C: tracks 11–12
- Side D: track 13

== Personnel ==
King Gizzard & the Lizard Wizard

- Stu Mackenzie – lead vocals, guitar (1–5, 7–13), flute (2, 6, 13), producer, mixing
- Joey Walker – guitar, backing vocals
- Cook Craig – guitar, synthesizer
- Ambrose Kenny-Smith – harmonica, backing vocals, organ
- Lucas Harwood – bass
- Michael Cavanagh – drums
- Eric Moore – drums

Additional personnel

- Terry Yerves – live recording
- Marco Martin – live recording
- John Karr – live recording
- Jason Galea – layout editor
- Joesph Carra – mastering
- Ben Butcher – photography
- Jamie Wdziekonski – photography

== Charts ==
Sales chart performance for Live in San Francisco '16
Chart (2020)	Peak position
US Top Album Sales (Billboard)	75
