= Live in Asheville '19 =

Live album by King Gizzard & the Lizard Wizard
- Released: 1 October 2020
- Recorded: 1 September 2019
- Venue: New Belgium Brewing Company
- Length: 90:04
- Producer: Stu Mackenzie

King Gizzard & the Lizard Wizard chronology
Demos Vol. 1 + Vol. 2 (2020)	Live in Asheville '19 (2020)	Live in San Francisco '16 (2020)

Live in Asheville '19 is a live album by Australian psychedelic rock band King Gizzard & the Lizard Wizard, which was released digitally to Bandcamp on 1 October 2020. They also released the Demos Vol. 1 + Vol. 2 album on the same day.

== Track listing ==
Live in Asheville '19 track listing
No.	Title	Length
1.	"Evil Star"	2:13
2.	"Self Immolate"	5:31
3.	"Venusian 1"	3:24
4.	"Alter Me III"	0:56
5.	"Altered Beast IV"	4:54
6.	"People Vultures"	5:30
7.	"This Thing"	6:10
8.	"Beginner's Luck"	5:36
9.	"Rattlesnake"	6:58
10.	"Cyboogie"	4:15
11.	"Loyalty"	4:23
12.	"Horology"	2:48
13.	"Boogieman Sam"	7:23
14.	"Plastic Boogie"	3:01
15.	"Mars for the Rich"	4:13
16.	"Hell"	3:55
17.	"The Lord Of Lightning"	5:39
18.	"The Bitter Boogie"	13:15
Total length:		90:04

== Personal ==
- Stu Mackenzie – Lead Vocals, Guitar, Keyboards, Vocoder, Flute
- Ambrose Kenny-Smith - Vocals, Harmonica, Synthesizers, Percussion
- Joey Walker - Guitar, Vocals
- Cook Craig - Guitar, Keyboards
- Lucas Harwood – Bass
- Michael Cavanagh – Drums
- Eric Moore - Drums

== Charts ==
Sales chart performance for Live in Asheville '19
Chart (2020)	Peak position
Australian Albums (ARIA)	30
