= Live at Field of Vision '25 =

Live album by King Gizzard and the Lizard Wizard
- Released: 4 September 2025
- Recorded: 15–17 August 2025
- Venue: Field of Vision festival, Buena Vista, Colorado
- Genre: Psychedelic rock
- Length: 8:30:51
- Label: Self-released

King Gizzard and the Lizard Wizard chronology
Live in New York City '25 (2025)	Live at Field of Vision '25 (2025)	Live at Red Rocks '23 (2025)

Live at Field of Vision '25 is a live album and music festival by Australian jam band King Gizzard & the Lizard Wizard. The album is three, 3-hour-long sets performed at the group's festival "Field of Vision" (named for a track from their 2024 album Flight b741) which took place in Buena Vista, Colorado, at Meadow Creek between 15–17 August 2025. The album is part of the group's "Official Bootlegger" series.

The outer acts that played included Babe Rainbow, King Stringray, and Hannah Cohen.

The album is dedicated to Matt Gawiak, a fan in attendance on the first day of the festival who died during the band's performance of "Oddlife". Stu Mackenzie and Joey Walker stopped the song and cleared the crowd so an ambulance could get through. After being rushed to the hospital Gawiak was pronounced dead the next morning of cardiac arrest at the age of 36. King Gizzard dedicated the last two songs of the festival "Float Along - Fill Your Lungs" and "The Dripping Tap" to Gawiak, "Oddlife" was the only song the band played that did not make it onto the album.

== Festival acts ==
*Timeland Stage, & Not Streamed.

Day 1:

- 1:00pm - Shannon Lay*
- 2:00pm - Reverend Baron*
- 3:30pm - Dj Crenshaw
- 3:45pm - King Stingray*
- 4:20pm - Songs for Kids Band!
- 5:00pm - Dj Crenshaw
- 5:30pm - White Fence
- 6:10pm - Dj Crenshaw
- 6:50pm - Hannah Cohen
- 7:20pm - Dj Crenshaw
- 8:00pm - King Gizzard & the Lizard Wizard
- 11:30pm - SPELLLING*
- 12:30am - Gaye Su Akyol*

Day 2:

- 12:00pm - Buena Vista High School Red Hots Jazz Band*
- 1:00pm - Michael Rault*
- 2:00pm - Jess Cornelius*
- 3:00pm - Tim Presley*
- 3:30pm - Dj Crenshaw
- 4:20pm - The Mystery Lights
- 5:00pm - DJ Crenshaw
- 5:30pm - King Stingray
- 6:10pm - Dj Crenshaw
- 6:40pm - Gaye Su Akyol
- 7:20pm - DJ Crenshaw
- 8:00pm - King Gizzard & the Lizard Wizard
- 11:30pm - Babe Rainbow*
- 12:30am - Ryley Walker*

Day 3:

- 12:00pm - Jello Biafra*
- 1:00pm - Babe Rainbow*
- 2:00pm - Jay Weinberg & Argus*
- 2:30pm - Jello Biafra
- 3:20pm - Pearl Charles
- 4:00pm - Jello Biafra*
- 4:30pm - Memo PST
- 5:10pm - Jello Biafra
- 5:40pm - Babe Rainbow
- 6:45pm - Yvie Oddly
- 7:00pm - King Gizzard & the Lizard Wizard
- 10:30pm - Pearl Charles*
- 11:30pm - King Stingray*

== Track listing ==
Night 1
No.	Title	Length
1.	"Gamma Knife"	7:15
2.	"People-Vultures"	6:55
3.	"Mr. Beat"	6:10
4.	"Field Of Vision"	3:51
5.	"Antarctica"	9:38
6.	"Nuclear Fusion"	6:16
7.	"Intrasport"	3:57
8.	"Superposition"	8:09
9.	"Kepler-22b"	8:36
10.	"Gilgamesh"	10:29
11.	"Extinction"	9:32
12.	"I'm In Your Mind"	3:17
13.	"I'm Not In Your Mind"	2:35
14.	"Cellophane"	3:35
15.	"I'm In Your Mind Fuzz"	3:30
16.	"Inner Cell"	3:48
17.	"Loyalty"	3:48
18.	"Horology"	3:29
19.	"Venusian 2"	4:29
20.	"Converge"	6:14
21.	"Witchcraft"	6:12
22.	"Gaia"	17:05
23.	"Police Truck" (featuring Jello Biafra)	5:36
24.	"Evil Death Roll"	14:59

Note: In between "Nuclear Fusion" and "Intrasport" they played "Oddlife", which was not on the album due to the collapse and later death of a fan named Matt Gawiak, to whom the album is dedicated.

Night 2
No.	Title	Length
1.	"Gila Monster"	4:54
2.	"Flamethrower"	5:07
3.	"Planet B"	4:44
4.	"Slow Jam 1"	10:18
5.	"Empty"	5:11
6.	"Hot Wax"	5:13
7.	"Superbug"	6:45
8.	"Magenta Mountain"	11:05
9.	"The Grim Reaper"	7:38
10.	"Flamethrower" (Outro)	6:10
11.	"Swan Song"	16:17
12.	"Welcome to an Altered Future"	0:51
13.	"Digital Black"	2:44
14.	"Han-Tyumi, The Confused Cyborg"	2:21
15.	"Soy-Protein Munt Machine"	0:29
16.	"Vomit Coffin"	2:01
17.	"Murder Of The Universe"	5:45
18.	"Le Risqué" (featuring Jay Weinberg)	5:20
19.	"Ice V"	13:01
20.	"Raw Feel"	6:22
21.	"Hot Water"	12:46
22.	"Boogieman Sam"	9:12
23.	"Straws In The Wind"	9:51
24.	"Pleura"	4:37
25.	"All Is Known"	5:47
26.	"Rattlesnake" (featuring King Stingray)	10:58

Night 3
No.	Title	Length
1.	"Theia" (Acoustic)	4:54
2.	"Sad Pilot" (Acoustic)	6:45
3.	"Most Of What I Like" (Acoustic)	4:42
4.	"Aerodynamic" (Acoustic)	6:10
5.	"Supercell"	5:18
6.	"Perihelion"	3:52
7.	"Venusian 1"	4:26
8.	"Her And I (Slow Jam 2)"	21:24
9.	"Motor Spirit"	12:03
10.	"O.N.E"	4:40
11.	"Billabong Valley"	8:50
12.	"K.G.L.W"	10:39
13.	"Sense"	13:53
14.	"Set"	14:33
15.	"The Silver Cord"	12:26
16.	"The Garden Goblin"	4:15
17.	"Daily Blues"	9:19
18.	"Float Along - Fill Your Lungs"	11:53
19.	"The Dripping Tap"	11:13

Note: The band performed set in drag.

== Personnel ==
King Gizzard and the Lizard Wizard

- Stu Mackenzie – lead vocals, electric guitar, acoustic guitar, keyboards, synthesizers, flute
- Ambrose Kenny-Smith – vocals, harmonica, synthesizers, percussion, saxophone
- Joey Walker – guitar, vocals, synthesizers, keyboards, acoustic guitar
- Cook Craig – guitar, keyboards, synthesizers, vocals
- Lucas Harwood – bass
- Michael Cavanagh – drums, percussion, e-drums

Additional musicians

- Jello Biafra – vocals (on "Police truck")
- Jay Weinberg – drums (on "Le Risqué")
- Dimathaya Burarrwanga – Yidaki (on "Rattlesnake")
- Yimila Gurruwiwi – Yidaki (on "Rattlesnake")
