= Let It Bleed (disambiguation) =

Let It Bleed is an album by the Rolling Stones.

Let It Bleed may also refer to:

- "Let It Bleed" (song), title track of the Rolling Stones album
- "Let It Bleed", a song by King Gizzard & the Lizard Wizard from Willoughby's Beach
- "Let It Bleed", a song by Goat from their 2012 album World Music
- Let It Bleed (novel), by Ian Rankin
- "Let It Bleed" (Heroes), an episode of the American science fiction drama series Heroes
- "Let It Bleed" (CSI), an episode of the American crime drama CSI: Crime Scene Investigation
- "Let It Bleed" (Rebus), an episode of the British detective drama Rebus
- "Let It Bleed", an episode of the American TV series Supernatural
