= Sophie Koko Gate =

Sophie Koko Gate is an artist, animation director, and writer in London.

== Biography ==
Gate grew up in Bath, England. She graduated with a degree in Animation from the Royal College of Art in 2014.

== Career ==
Her films have been exhibited at festivals around the globe, including the Edinburgh Film Festival, Sundance Film Festival, BFI London Film Festival, Sydney Film Festival, London International Animation Festival and SXSW. Her short film "Slug Life" won the Special Jury Award at the 2019 SXSW Film Festival. She was shortlisted for the Film London Jarman Award 2023.

== Filmography ==
- Half-Wet (2014)
- Slug Life (2019)
- Hotel Kalura (2021)
- Milk Bath 1 & 2 (2024)
