= Teenage Gizzard =

Compilation album by King Gizzard & the Lizard Wizard
- Released: 24 December 2020
- Recorded: 2010–2011
- Genre: Surf rock
- Length: 29:27
- Label: Self-released; ATO; Vinyl Religion; Fuzz Club
- Producer: Stu Mackenzie

King Gizzard & the Lizard Wizard chronology
K.G. (2020)	Teenage Gizzard (2020)	Live in London '19 (2020)

Teenage Gizzard is a compilation album by King Gizzard & the Lizard Wizard released on 24 December 2020. It compiles the earliest known recordings by the band from 2010 and 2011. This is also the first official release of their debut EP Anglesea as well as their first two singles ("Hey There / Ants & Bats" and "Sleep" / "Summer!") and an unreleased song. The album was exclusively released as a bootleg on Bandcamp and on vinyl.

== Background ==
King Gizzard & the Lizard Wizard started off as an informal jam band, with the eventual lineup becoming Mackenzie, Walker, Moore, Kenny-Smith, Cavanagh, Craig and Harwood. Ambrose Kenny-Smith entered the band in 2011, and is absent from most of the early recordings. The band's first releases were two singles in 2010 – "Hey There / Ants & Bats" and "Sleep" / "Summer!" – and both were self-released. The band's next release, 2011's Anglesea, was released as a four-track EP on CD. It is named after Anglesea, the coastal town where Mackenzie grew up (as well as the town where they lost a battle of the bands to punk rockers Hole in the Shoe). These early releases did not become available digitally until the inclusion of their tracks on the Teenage Gizzard compilation.

== Reception ==
A review on ThePsychRock praised the album giving it a score of 8.6/10. The review describes the album as "a banger with high energy rock the whole way through. The music feels wholesome and joyful with creative songs". It notes the stripped back and basic songwriting, compared to later releases, and describes the album as "surfy", "psyched out", and "lo-fi".

== Track listing ==
Tracks 1–8 recorded at Anglesea, Victoria, Tracks 9–10 were recorded at Carlton, Victoria
No.	Title	Notes	Length
1.	"Hey There"	First released as a non-album single	3:50
2.	"Ants and Bats"	B-side to Hey There	3:11
3.	"Sleep"	First released as a non-album single	3:36
4.	"Summer!"	B-side to Sleep	2:46
5.	"Eddie Cousin"	First released on Anglesea EP	2:38
6.	"Fried"	First released on Anglesea EP	3:10
7.	"Good to Me"	First released on Anglesea EP	2:23
8.	"Tomb/Beach"	First released on Anglesea EP	3:47
9.	"Trench Foot"	First released as a non-album single, also included in the New Centre of the Universe Vol #1 compilation	1:55
10.	"Life Is Cool"	Previously unreleased	2:11
Total length:			29:27

== Charts ==
Chart performance for Teenage Gizzard
Chart (2021)	Peak position
Scottish Albums (OCC)	53
UK Independent Albums (OCC)	48
US Top Current Album Sales (Billboard)	38
