= Bernard Lachance =

Canadian singer-songwriter (1974–2021)

- Born: 23 June 1974; Lévis, Quebec, Canada
- Died: 11 May 2021 (aged 46)
- Occupation: Singer-Songwriter

Bernard Lachance (23 June 1974 – 11 May 2021) was a Canadian singer-songwriter.

== Biography ==
Lachance had a great interest in music during his youth, starting with piano. He began studying at the Conservatoire de musique du Québec à Québec in 1989 before leaving Quebec City for Montreal to work in show business. He notably performed at the Capitole de Québec and the Molson Centre. In 1997, he founded the production labels Phénix Productions and Prospectart alongside Serge Paré. He then released his first album, Seul, with composer Jean-Paul Dréau and engineer Bernard Torelli. It was released in 1998 and received immediate success. However, his production studios closed soon afterwards and he severed ties with Paré.

In 2000, Lachance founded the record label Productions Ad Libitum, with Sylvain Gagné as his sole investor. He then released his second album, Ad Libitum, which sold over 100,000 copies. In 2005, he nearly signed with Universal Music Group, although the partnership did not come to fruition. He then released another album, titled While I Remember You.

In 2003, Lachance performed a solo concert at the Bell Centre, selling 4000 tickets. In 2007, he performed at Massey Hall in Toronto and at Radio City Music Hall in New York City in 2008. The following year, he signed with the record label Isba.

In 2020, Lachance appeared on Denis Lévesque's program on Le Canal Nouvelles, he alleged that AIDS is a "fraudulent, criminal and also scripted by the same actors and the same institutions as those involved in the COVID-19 pandemic". Lévesque did not broadcast the interview. Lachance then published a paper on the internet on HIV/AIDS denialism. Afterwards, he was invited to Alexis Cossette-Trudel's YouTube channel to discuss the parallels between AIDS and the COVID-19 pandemic.

On 8 January 2024, Bernard’s sister Marie‑Claude Lachance, a technician in a university research setting, appeared on the French‑Canadian podcast Dérives (OHdio) to discuss his life and views on AIDS. She stated that he had stopped taking his HIV medication years earlier, relying instead on natural products, and described his weight loss and systemic illness before his death. The same podcast discussed the alignment between Bernard’s views and those of biologist Peter Duesberg, a well‑known HIV/AIDS denialist.

Bernard Lachance died on 11 May 2021, at the age of 46. On January 7, 2022, following a coroner's inquiry, it was demonstrated that Bernard Lachance died of HIV-AIDS related sepsis.

== Discography ==
- Seul (1998)
- Ad Libitum (2000)
- While I Remember You (2005)
