= Wellington E. Alves =

Brazilian flautist and composer

Wellington Eleutério Alves
- Origin: Maringá, Brazil
- Genres: Contemporary, classical
- Occupations: Musician, flautist, composer
- Instrument: Flute
- Member of: Ensemble Ad Libitum; Orquestra Filarmônica Cesumar; Orquestra Sinfônica da Uem; Coral de Flautas da Uem

Wellington Eleutério Alves is a Brazilian flautist and composer.

He studied flute at the Universidade Estadual de Maringá. He currently plays with Orquestra Filarmônica Cesumar, Orquestra Sinfônica da Uem, Coral de Flautas da Uem. He is also the founding member of the Ensemble Ad Libitum, a group dedicated to contemporary music. Alves studied composition with Rael Toffolo at the Universidade Estadual de Maringá. His chamber music has been performed by several ensembles e.g. Ensemble Ad Libitum and Coral de Flautas.

== Repertoire Selections ==
=== With Orquestra Filarmônica Cesumar ===
- Camargo Guarnieri: Dança Brasileira
- Dorival Caymmi: Suíte dos Pescadores
- Ary Barroso: Aquarela do Brasil
- Hans Zimmer: Hedvigs Theme

=== With Ensemble Ad Libitum ===
- Renato Segati de Moraes: Trio No. 1 (2010)
- Renato Segati de Moraes: Atirei o Pau no Gato (2011)
- Tauan Gonzalez Sposito: Fermáta, Op. 1 (2010)
- Tauan Gonzalez Sposito: Correspondências, Op. 2 (2011)

=== Compositions ===
- No Fun. No 1
- Trio No. 1
- Ictus
