= Ad Lib (comedy show) =

Comedy show

- Genre: Spontaneous conversation

Creative team
- Founder: Stuart Snaith
- Producer: Dan Schreiber

Ad Lib is a comedy show consisting of ad lib conversations, usually between famous writers and comedians, each with a mutual interest.

== History ==
Ad Lib is the brainchild of Stuart Snaith, formerly Director of Comedy at BBC Worldwide and MD of 2entertain, and was launched on 21 August 2013 at the Edinburgh Festival, produced by Dan Schreiber. The opening night featured TV writer Steven Moffat (Doctor Who, Sherlock) and comedian Frank Skinner, a Doctor Who fan, compered by Scottish comedian Fred MacAulay. Ad Lib ran at Edinburgh for a further four consecutive nights, featuring Terry Pratchett with John Lloyd, John Bishop with Jason Manford and Andrew Maxwell, Neil Gaiman with Phill Jupitus and Mitch Benn, and Sarah Millican with Hannah Gadsby and Susan Calman.

== In the news ==
The first Ad Lib event featuring Steven Moffat and Frank Skinner drew considerable media interest. for Moffat's comments on two subjects: Sherlock's fall in the last episode of the series and the appointment of Peter Capaldi as the new Doctor Who. Moffat conceded that the Doctor can only regenerate 12 times (Capaldi is the 12th) but did not reveal how, or if, he intended to get round this in future. He also stated that he would be surprised if Capaldi did not play the part in his native Scottish accent.

== The future ==
According to the website of Ad Lib founder Stuart Snaith, he is in discussions about developing the format for television, as well as taking it live to London and America, and returning to Edinburgh in 2014.
