= Lib =

Lib may refer to:

== Computing ==
- Library (computing)
  - .lib, a static library on Microsoft platforms
  - /lib, a directory on Unix-like systems
- Lib-80, a Microsoft Library Manager tool; see Microsoft MACRO-80

== People ==
- Lib, one of two Jaredite kings in the Book of Mormon
- Hypocorism for Elizabeth (given name)
- Lib Spry, Canadian theatre director and playwright

== Politics ==
- Lib Dems (Japan)
- Shorthand for Liberal
  - Supporters of the Liberal Party of Australia
- Liberation (disambiguation) (e.g. "women's lib")
- Libertarians

== Other uses ==
- Lib Island in the Marshall Islands
- Libra (constellation), astronomical abbreviation
- A library or institution housing books

== See also ==
- LIB (disambiguation)
