= Anglesea (EP) =

EP by King Gizzard & the Lizard Wizard
- Released: 18 March 2011
- Studio: A Secret Location Sound Recorders
- Genre: Garage rock; noise rock; lo-fi; surf rock
- Length: 11:59
- Label: Self released (Later re-released by Flightless in 2020 on Teenage Gizzard)
- Producer: Stu Mackenzie

King Gizzard & the Lizard Wizard chronology
Anglesea (2011)	Willoughby's Beach (2011)

Anglesea is the debut EP by Australian psychedelic rock band King Gizzard & the Lizard Wizard. It was released on 18 March 2011. The EP features the simple lyrical style and noisy arrangements found throughout many of King Gizzard's earliest songs. It was initially released on CD, and was not available digitally until the EPs inclusion on the Teenage Gizzard compilation, a collection of pre-Willoughby's Beach tracks.

== Background ==
King Gizzard & the Lizard Wizard started off as an informal jam band, playing shows to a small number of people around Melbourne and Geelong playing the few songs they had. During this time, at Stu Mackenzie's parents house, the band borrowed a bunch of microphones and set them up in the garage and recorded the few tracks they had been playing live. Mackenzie has stated that he does not believe the record counts, not being sure whether Cook Craig or Ambrose Kenny-Smith were in the band yet, saying nobody should listen to it.

== Title ==
It is named after Anglesea, the seaside surf village where Mackenzie grew up (also being the town where they lost a battle of the bands to punk rock band Hole in the Shoe).

== Track listing ==
Anglesea track listing
No.	Title	Length
1.	"Eddie Cousin"	2:38
2.	"Fried"	3:10
3.	"Good to Me"	2:23
4.	"Tomb/Beach"	3:47
Total length:		11:59

== Personnel ==
King Gizzard & the Lizard Wizard

- Michael Cavanagh – drums
- Lucas Skinner – bass, vocals
- Joey Walker – guitar, vocals
- Stu Mackenzie – vocals, guitar
- Eric Moore – drums

Production

- Artwork By [Cover Art] [Uncredited] – Katie Hagebols
- Mastered By – Alex Braithwaite
- Mixed By – Stu Mackenzie
- Recorded By [Uncredited] – King Gizzard*
