= Let It Be =

Let It Be most commonly refers to:

- Let It Be (album), the Beatles' final studio album, released in 1970
- "Let It Be" (song), the title song from the album

Let It Be may also refer to:

== Film and television ==
- Let It Be (1970 film), a documentary about the Beatles album
- Let It Be (2004 film), a Taiwanese documentary about peasant farmers
- "Let It Be" (Grey's Anatomy), a 2005 episode of Grey's Anatomy
- "Let It Be" (Instant Star), a 2007 episode of Instant Star

== Music ==
- Let It Be (musical), a West End musical using Beatles songs

=== Albums ===
- Let It Be (Bud Shank album), a 1970 jazz album featuring the Beatles song
- Let It Be (EP), a 1984 EP by Green Jellö
- Let It Be (Laibach album), a cover of the Beatles album
- Let It Be (The Replacements album), 1984

=== Songs ===
- "Let It Be" (Labrinth song), 2014
- "Let It Be", a 1996 song by Gotthard from G.
- "Let It Be", a 2003 song by Benny Benassi from Hypnotica
- "Let It Be", a 2006 song by Groove Coverage from 21st Century
- "Let It Be", a 2018 song by Hayley Kiyoko from Expectations

== See also ==
- "Let It Be", a storyline in the science fiction comedy webtoon series Live with Yourself!
- Let It Be... Naked, an alternative 2003 remix version of the Beatles album
- Let It Bee, an album by Voice of the Beehive
