= Planet B (song) =

Single by King Gizzard & the Lizard Wizard

from the album Infest the Rats' Nest
- Released: 8 April 2019
- Genre: Thrash metal
- Length: 3:56
- Label: Flightless; ATO
- Songwriter: Stu Mackenzie
- Producer: Stu Mackenzie

King Gizzard & the Lizard Wizard singles chronology
"Boogieman Sam" (2019)	"Planet B" (2019)	"The Bird Song" (2019)

Music video
- "Planet B" on YouTube

"Planet B" is a song by Australian rock band King Gizzard & the Lizard Wizard, first released on 8 April 2019 as the lead single for the band's fifteenth studio album Infest the Rats' Nest.

== Release ==
The track was released before the Infest the Rats' Nest announcement and before the bands fourteenth album, Fishing for Fishies came out. The song's notable switch into thrash metal and lack of inclusion on Fishing for Fishies started a rumor that a new album was on the way. This rumour was confirmed on 30 April 2019, on a Reddit question-and-answer, in which the album was revealed and that it would include "Planet B".

== Composition ==
The track has been described as having gruff vocals, shredding and squealing guitars, chugging riffs, and thundering drums throughout the track. Overall being considered a large departure from the bands typical psychedelic rock sound, it has been said to sound similar in vein to thrash metal bands such as Metallica and Megadeth.

Similar to the rest of the tracks on the album, the lyrics deal with the environment and its mistreatment, along with climate change, featuring the line "there is no planet B".

== Music video ==
The track was released alongside a music video, in which the seven members run around an empty highway in all orange "barking like dogs", "smiling demonically", and dancing until the ending in which a stranger shoots the members and lights them on fire. Many critics have described the video as violent, bizarre, and surreal.

== Personnel ==
King Gizzard & the Lizard Wizard

- Stu Mackenzie – lead vocals, guitar, recording, mixing
- Joey Walker – bass
- Michael Cavanagh – drums

Technical

- Michael Badger – recording
- Joe Carra – mastering
