= Willoughby's Beach =

EP by King Gizzard & the Lizard Wizard
- Released: 21 October 2011
- Studio: A Secret Location Sound Recorders
- Genre: Garage rock; noise rock; lo-fi; surf rock
- Length: 22:52
- Label: Self released (Later re-released by Flightless in 2018)

King Gizzard & the Lizard Wizard chronology
Anglesea (2011)	Willoughby's Beach (2011)	12 Bar Bruise (2012)

Singles from Willoughby's Beach
- 1. "Black Tooth" / "Willoughby's Beach" Released: 2011

Willoughby's Beach is the second EP by Australian psychedelic rock band King Gizzard & the Lizard Wizard. It was released on 21 October 2011. It peaked at No. 15 on the ARIA Albums Chart after being released on vinyl in November 2018.

The EP generally features a rawer and less refined sound compared to its successor 12 Bar Bruise. The album features the band's first use of unconventional and experimental instruments such as the theremin.

== Track listing ==
Vinyl releases have tracks 1–5 on Side A and tracks 6–9 on Side B.

All tracks are written by Stu Mackenzie.

Willoughby's Beach track listing
No.	Title	Length
1.	"Danger $$$"	1:45
2.	"Black Tooth"	2:30
3.	"Lunch Meat"	1:40
4.	"Crookedile"	2:30
5.	"Let It Bleed"	3:13
6.	"Dead-Beat"	3:01
7.	"Dustbin Fletcher"	3:09
8.	"Stoned Mullet"	2:11
9.	"Willoughby's Beach"	2:53
Total length:		22:52

== Personnel ==
Credits for Willoughby's Beach EP adapted from liner notes.

King Gizzard & the Lizard Wizard

- Michael Cavanagh – drums
- Lucas Skinner – bass, vocals
- Joey Walker – guitar, vocals
- Stu Mackenzie – vocals, guitar
- Ambrose Kenny-Smith – harmonica
- Cook Craig – guitar, vocals
- Eric Moore – drums, theremin

Production

- Paul Maybury – recording, mixing
- Joseph Carra – mastering
- Ican Harem – cover art
- Ben Butcher – insert photo

== Charts ==
Chart (2018)	Peak position
Australian Albums (ARIA)	15
