= Polygondwanaland =

2017 studio album by King Gizzard & the Lizard Wizard

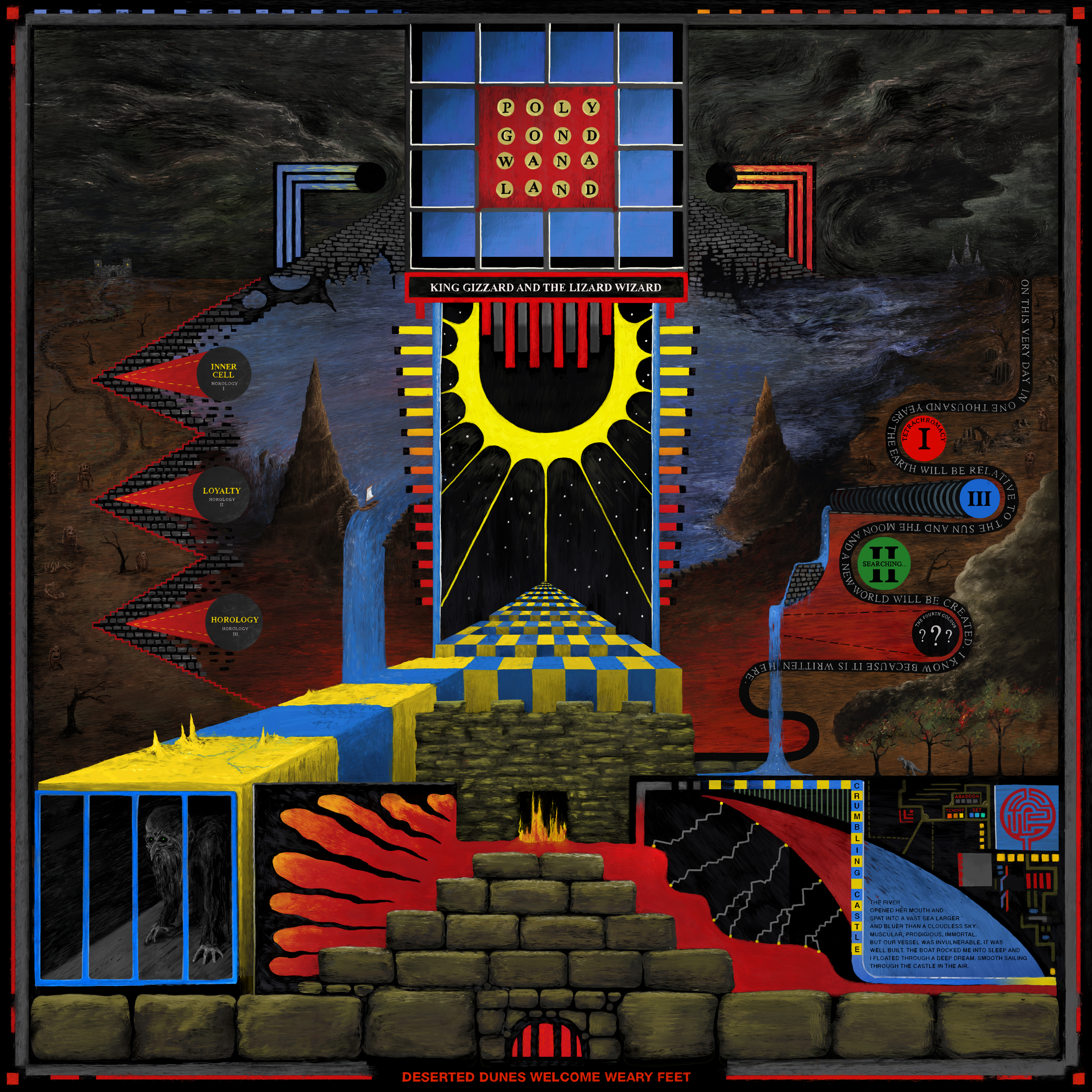

Studio album by King Gizzard & the Lizard Wizard
- Released: 17 November 2017
- Studios: Flightless HQ; Tender Trap Studios, Melbourne ("Crumbling Castle" and "The Fourth Colour")
- Genres: Progressive rock; psychedelic rock
- Length: 43:54
- Labels: Flightless; Various
- Producer: Stu Mackenzie

King Gizzard & the Lizard Wizard chronology
Sketches of Brunswick East (2017)	Polygondwanaland (2017)	Gumboot Soup (2017)

Singles from Polygondwanaland
- 1. "Crumbling Castle" Released: 18 October 2017

Polygondwanaland (/ˈpɒliɡɒndˌwɑːnəlænd/) is the twelfth studio album by Australian psychedelic rock band King Gizzard & the Lizard Wizard. The album was released under a Creative Commons Attribution-NoDerivatives license, allowing fans to make remixes. The band uploaded the master tapes online for anyone to freely use. The fourth of five albums released by the band in 2017, it was released on 17 November 2017.

== Background and conception ==
The album's title is a portmanteau of the words polygon and Gondwanaland.

Polygondwanaland first appeared as a partial leak on the band's demos for the album. The leak was uploaded to SoundCloud in April 2017, but was soon taken down. As a result, news of the album was scarce and mostly involved rumours, one of which stated that it would be the last of the five albums released in 2017.

The track "Crumbling Castle," which appeared on the demo, was performed live by the band as early as September 2016, albeit in a much shorter form. However, it lay dormant for many months during an especially prolific period for the band, leading to speculation that the track might have been scrapped. Both the track and the music video were finally released on 19 October 2017, exactly one year after the first performance of the song was uploaded to YouTube. The legitimacy of the demos were all but confirmed at this point, as not only did the track feature the album's name in the lyrics, but it also contained lengthy musical passages equal in duration to the demo.

== Release ==
Polygondwanaland was officially announced on the band's Facebook page on 14 November 2017. The release date and cover art were publicized by the band, who stated, "This album is FREE. Free as in, free," encouraging fans to make their own copies and bootlegs of the album. The band said that they would not be selling the album in any shape or form, even going so far as to put the master tapes online (including a vinyl master) for free use. The album was uploaded to streaming services such as Spotify and Apple Music on 18 November. Masters and artwork files can be downloaded from the band's website for personal use or for pressing CDs and vinyl.

On the day of the announcement, multiple labels announced they would be producing their own physical copies of the album. Among these were ATO Records, Blood Music, Needlejuice Records, Fuzz Cult Records and Greenway Records. Fans also started crowdfunding campaigns on sites like Facebook and Kickstarter to produce their own versions of the album. After being released by 88 labels worldwide in 188 different variants, they announced an 'official Flightless pressing' of Polygondwanaland. It has been called "the ultimate vinyl release" by Louder than Sound.

Versions of the album downloaded from the band's website are sometimes accompanied by a lyrics text file translated into Esperanto and an ASCII banner of the band's name at the top.

== Music ==
The album has been described as progressive rock and psychedelic rock. It contains extensive use of odd-meter polymeters, with no song written entirely in 4/4 time.

== Reception ==
Professional ratings
Aggregate scores
Source	Rating
Metacritic	78/100
Review scores
Source	Rating
AllMusic	4/5 stars
Loud and Quiet	9/10
Pitchfork	7.2/10

Polygondwanaland was generally well received by professional music critics upon its initial release. In a 4 out of 5 star review for AllMusic, writer Tim Sendra claimed "Hearing them incorporate all the different sonic flourishes they've employed in the past in pursuit of good songs and not some higher concept means the album may slip past unnoticed, but it will sound great to anyone not scared off by the lack of theatrics. Tracks like the spookily restrained "Searching," the rampaging "The Fourth Colour," the tribal "The Castle in the Air," or the thrumming title track are the work of a band in full command of their process and results."

Cultural theorist Benjamin Kirbach argues that, like Murder of the Universe (which also came out in 2017), the narrative of Polygondwanaland "adheres to a similarly mythopoetic three-act structure in which civilization is threatened by ecological calamity." According to Kirbach:

The ensuing political strife results in a failed coup, the mutilated survivors of which ("Having had his eyes gouged / He left without the gift of sight") cybernetically enhance themselves and ultimately regain power by colonizing the world of/as information. The album's name is a pun first of all on gondwanaland, a neoproterozoic supercontinent that would have included modern-day Australia, as well as "poly," which no doubt refers to the polyrhythmic composition of the music as well as indeed—in polysemic fashion—polygon, a multisided object which in this case could refer to the polygonal nature of computer graphics. The new supercontinent, polygondwanaland itself, is the terra incognita of digital information systems ("My body’s not a temple / It is a vessel / And a blank slate / An empty hard-drive"), and once human beings enter into it, they're able to see beyond the normal three-dimensions via a new "tetrachromatic" hodography of user-generated data ("Many fingers, many minds and / Many eyeballs puppet my feet"). After a final flare-up of fuzzed-out guitars, Polygondwanaland ends with [the cyborg] Han-Tyumi's familiar voice, intoning nothing more than the word "Hello." This is not Murder of the Universe, but Han-Tyumi's arrival is enough to link the two albums conceptually (if not diegetically). On the vinyl record, the needle then enters a locked groove, "Hello" repeating in an endless mechanical loop lest a human hand reach in to stop it.

Pitchfork gave the album a score of 7.2/10 and ranked it 17th in their list of the 20 best rock albums of 2017.

== Track listing ==
Vinyl releases have tracks 1–4 on Side A, and tracks 5–10 on Side B.
Track titles adapted from diymag.com. Writing credits from Flightless Records' LP label.

No.	Title	Writer(s)	Audio	Length
1.	"Crumbling Castle"	Stu Mackenzie	Crumbling Castle	10:46
2.	"Polygondwanaland"	Mackenzie	Polygondwanaland	3:33
3.	"The Castle in the Air"	Mackenzie; Joey Walker	The Castle in the Air	2:48
4.	"Deserted Dunes Welcome Weary Feet"	Mackenzie; Walker; Michael Cavanagh	Deserted Dunes Welcome Weary Feet	3:34
5.	"Inner Cell"	Walker; Mackenzie; Cavanagh	Inner Cell	3:56
6.	"Loyalty"	Walker; Mackenzie; Cavanagh	Loyalty	3:39
7.	"Horology"	Walker; Mackenzie; Cavanagh	Horology	2:52
8.	"Tetrachromacy"	Walker; Mackenzie; Cavanagh	Tetrachromacy	3:31
9.	"Searching..."	Mackenzie	Searching...	3:04
10.	"The Fourth Colour"	Mackenzie	The Fourth Colour	6:13
Total length:				43:54

== Personnel ==
Credits for Polygondwanaland from Bandcamp album credits.

King Gizzard & the Lizard Wizard

- Michael Cavanagh – drums (tracks 1–8), percussion (1, 2, 3, 8, 10), glass marimba (1)
- Cook Craig – electric guitar (1, 8, 10), synthesizers (9, 10)
- Ambrose Kenny-Smith – harmonica (1, 3, 8, 10), vocals (8, 10)
- Stu Mackenzie – vocals, synthesizers; electric guitar (1, 2, 4, 7, 8, 10), bass guitar (1, 3–7, 9), acoustic guitar (2, 4, 8–10), flute (1–3, 5–8), glass marimba (1), mellotron (2, 4), percussion (9)
- Eric Moore– management (all tracks)
- Lucas Skinner – bass guitar (10), synthesizer (7)
- Joey Walker – electric guitar (1, 3, 5–7, 10), acoustic guitar (3, 5), bass guitar (1, 2, 4, 8), synthesizers (5–7, 9, 10), vocals (1–8, 10), percussion (1–3, 5, 7, 8, 10)

Additional musicians

- Leah Senior – spoken word (3)

Production

- Casey Hartnett – recording (2–5, 7, 8)
- Stu Mackenzie – recording (6, 9), additional recording, production
- Ryan K. Brennan – recording (1, 10)
- Joey Walker – additional recording
- Sam Joseph – mixing
- Joe Carra – mastering
- Jason Galea – artwork and layout
- Eric Moore– management

== Charts ==
Chart performance for Polygondwanaland
Chart (2017)	Peak position
US Heatseekers Albums (Billboard)	17
US Independent Albums (Billboard)	45
