= Infest the Rats' Nest =

Studio album by King Gizzard & the Lizard Wizard
- Released: 16 August 2019
- Genres: Thrash metal; stoner rock; doom metal
- Length: 34:50
- Labels: Flightless; ATO
- Producer: Stu Mackenzie

King Gizzard & the Lizard Wizard chronology
Fishing for Fishies (2019)	Infest the Rats' Nest (2019)	K.G. (2020)

Full chronology
Fishing for Fishies (2019)	Infest the Rats' Nest (2019)	Live in Paris '19 (2020)

Singles from Infest the Rats' Nest
- 1. "Planet B" Released: 8 April 2019; 2. "Self-Immolate" Released: 28 May 2019; 3. "Organ Farmer" Released: 25 June 2019

Infest the Rats' Nest is the fifteenth studio album by Australian psychedelic rock band King Gizzard & the Lizard Wizard. It was released on 16 August 2019 by the band's record label, Flightless, and ATO Records. The album sees the band using a heavy metal and thrash metal style, which they had only briefly touched upon on previous albums. Its lyrics address environmental themes such as climate change and ecological disaster through a cli-fi narrative involving space colonization.

The album received generally positive reviews, with critics highlighting the performances and themes, and was nominated for the 2019 ARIA Award for Best Hard Rock or Heavy Metal Album. The album charted in several countries, including peaking at number 2 on the ARIA Charts and number 3 on US Independent Albums.

This is the band's last album with the drummer and manager Eric Moore (who for this album only contributed with the backing vocals), before his departure the following year

== Background and release ==
King Gizzard & the Lizard Wizard released five albums in 2017, concluding with Gumboot Soup in December. Following a brief hiatus, on 21 January 2019 the band teased their fourteenth studio album, which would later be announced as Fishing for Fishies. Prior to its full release on 26 April 2019, the band surprise-released single "Planet B" on 8 April alongside a music video. The song's exclusion from the album's track listing and distinct sound led to speculation that the band might release a second album in 2019.

During a question-and-answer on 30 April with fans on Reddit, the band confirmed the next album was at an early stage of production and would include "Planet B", but they had not decided if it would be released in 2019. The album was speculated to be titled Auto-Cremate, the band's username on their Reddit Q&A.

On 29 May, the band released the album's second single "Self-Immolate" with another accompanying music video a week after a teaser on social media. On 18 June, the band posted another teaser on social media which confirmed the album's title. The album was officially announced three days later with a release date of 16 August. On 25 June, the band released a third single, "Organ Farmer", along with a music video that included fans as extras. On August 13, the band released Mars For The Rich, a first-person shooter browser game named after and featuring the album's second track. The album was released on August 16 on Flightless and ATO Records.

== Composition ==
=== Music ===
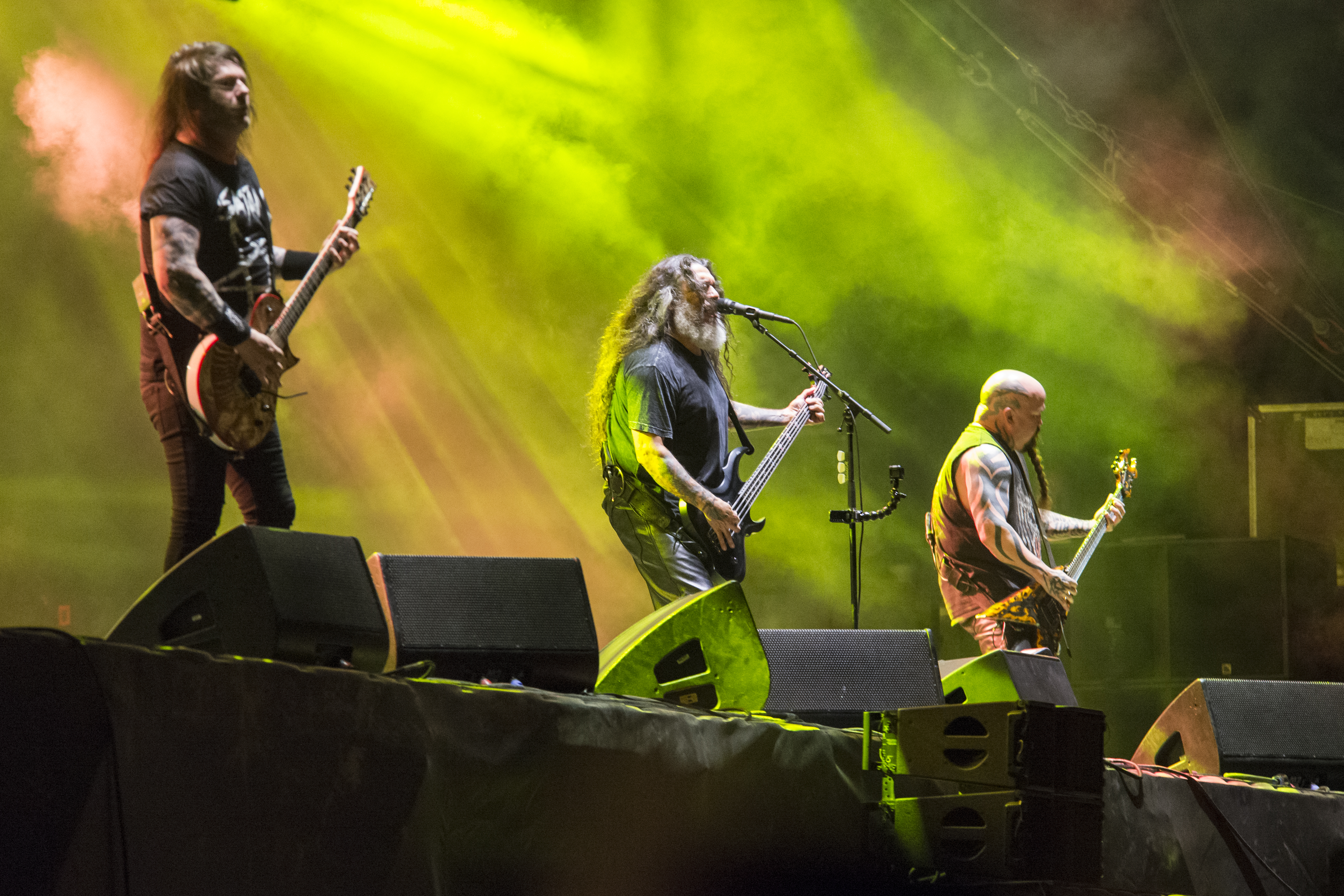
Heavy metal groups such as Slayer were an influence on the sound of Infest the Rats' Nest.

Infest the Rats' Nest was composed and recorded primarily with only three of the band's usual seven-man lineup. Stu Mackenzie and Joey Walker recorded all guitar and bass parts, with Michael Cavanagh playing the drums. The album showcases influences derived from heavy metal, mixing the band's signature garage rock guitar tones and psychedelic rock sounds with thrash metal and doom metal. The group had experimented with heavy music in previous releases such as Nonagon Infinity, but Infest the Rats' Nest marked a deeper exploration of the style. Beyond thrash metal, it has also been described as a stoner rock album.

Cavs and Joe and I grew up on a fair amount of heavy metal, and so the three of us just started jamming this heavy stuff which just turned into the record. It was very natural.

— Stu Mackenzie

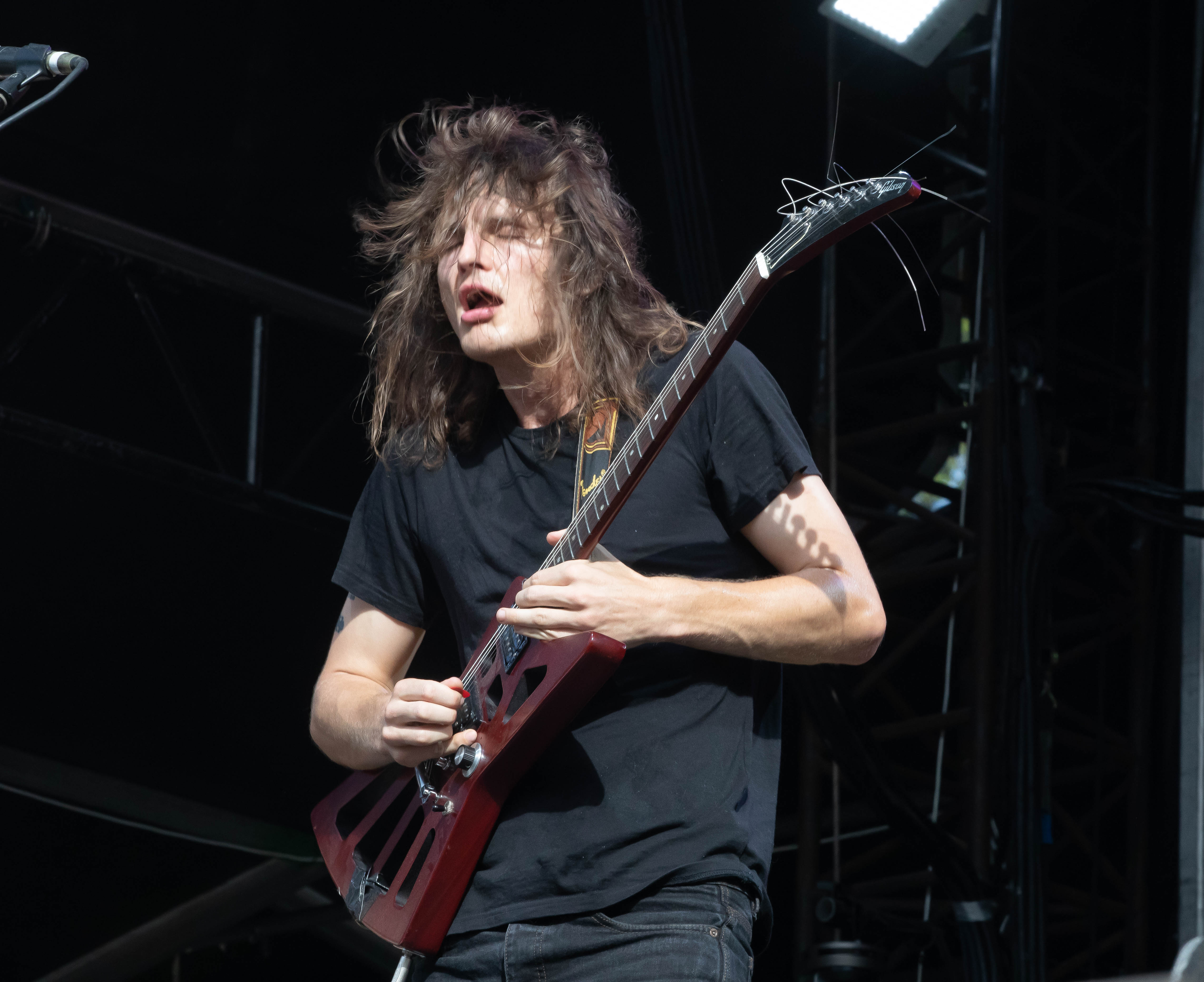
Stu Mackenzie used a Gibson Explorer on all songs on the album.

Mackenzie cited groups such as Motörhead, Metallica, Slayer, Exodus, Overkill, Sodom, Rammstein and Kreator as influences. On creating Infest the Rats' Nest, he said the band intended to "be more extreme and more intense – just to see how it would take shape". Mackenzie's acquisition of a Gibson Explorer was also said to have inspired the heavier sound, and was used on every song on the album. Heavy metal guitar techniques are used throughout, such as shredding and chugging, in addition to the wah-wah and delay effects more typical of the band's style. As with other releases, unusual time signatures are present. The album makes consistent use of double kick drumming and harsh vocal delivery. "Superbug" has been described as a more downtempo stoner rock or sludge metal song than the rest of the track listing, and has been compared to the work of Sleep or Melvins. "Mars for the Rich" was compared by some reviewers to Black Sabbath, and "Perihelion" has been likened to power metal.

=== Lyrics ===
On the album's lyrical themes, frontman Stu Mackenzie explained that the A-side is about contemporary issues such as ecological disaster and climate change and is set in the near future, and the B-side follows a group of rebels attempting to colonise Venus after being forced to leave Earth. In this "cli-fi" narrative, the group eventually die and enter Hell. Mackenzie said on the lyrics: "We've got a lot of things to fear... I spend a lot of time thinking about the future of humanity and the future of Planet Earth".

"Planet B" opens the album, featuring the refrain "there is no Planet B". "Mars for the Rich" criticises inequality in the context of climate change, with the wealthy exploiting Mars, while the poor survive on a degraded Earth. "Organ Farmer" addresses intensive farming and beef production. "Superbug" discusses a disease outbreak that causes a mass extinction. "Perihelion", "Venusian 1" and "Venusian 2" begins the science fiction narrative, addressing ozone depletion. "Self-Immolate" uses self-immolation as a metaphor for the self-destruction of the human race, with "Hell" closing the album and its narrative.

== Critical reception ==
Professional ratings
Aggregate scores
Source	Rating
Metacritic	77/100
Review scores
Source	Rating
AllMusic	4.5/5 stars
Clash	7/10
Classic Rock	3.5/5 stars
Exclaim!	8/10
NME	3/5 stars
Pitchfork	6.7/10
Under the Radar	6.5/10 stars

Infest the Rats' Nest was well received by music critics upon its release. On the review aggregator website Metacritic, the album has a score of 77 out of 100 based on 14 reviews, indicating "generally favorable reviews". In his review for AllMusic, writer Tim Sendra concluded that "King Gizzard aren't sugarcoating anything, either musically or thematically, and that makes for their most timely and political album yet. It's also one of their most musically compelling and impressive, too, and that's saying a lot." Stuart Berman in Pitchfork commended the album as the band's "most succinct and single-minded statement to date" and its themes and heavy metal performances, but also said that it was "lacking both the unpredictable detours of their biggest rock-outs and the insidious melodies of their more pop-focused work." A three out of five star NME review by Danii Leivers highlighted "Planet B" as a standout and compared it to Master of Puppets-era Metallica, but noted "as the album reaches its mid-section, the material does start to wear thin" and that not all of the tracks were memorable or cohesive.

In PopMatters, Callum Bains described Infest the Rats' Nest as "a brutal, fear-inducing harbinger of our impending existential doom as the band steps on the soapbox to paint the apocalyptic horror of the climate emergency". In Consequence, William Ruben Helms praised the musical performances and dark lyrical themes, and concluded that "while it feels like a minor misstep in comparison to much of their catalog, it finds the band crafting forceful and ferocious, mosh pit-friendly rippers that are politically and socially relevant."

=== Accolades ===
At the ARIA Music Awards of 2019, the album was nominated for ARIA Award for Best Hard Rock or Heavy Metal Album, losing to Northlane for Alien. AllMusic also listed Infest the Rats' Nest as one of the "favorite metal albums" of 2019.

List of appearances on year-end lists
Publication	List	Rank	Ref.
Rolling Stone	10 Best Metal Albums of 2019	6	
Gigwise	51 Best Albums of 2019	23	
Mojo	75 Best Albums of 2019	35	

== Track listing ==
Vinyl releases have tracks 1–4 on Side A, and tracks 5–9 on Side B.

Infest the Rats' Nest track listing
No.	Title	Writer(s)	Length
1.	"Planet B"	Stu Mackenzie	3:56
2.	"Mars for the Rich"	Mackenzie; Joey Walker; Michael Cavanagh	4:11
3.	"Organ Farmer"	Mackenzie; Walker; Cavanagh	2:39
4.	"Superbug"	Mackenzie	6:43
5.	"Venusian 1"	Mackenzie	3:20
6.	"Perihelion"	Mackenzie; Walker; Cavanagh	3:11
7.	"Venusian 2"	Mackenzie; Walker; Cavanagh	2:44
8.	"Self-Immolate"	Mackenzie; Walker; Cavanagh	4:28
9.	"Hell"	Mackenzie; Walker; Cavanagh	3:38
Total length:			34:50

== Personnel ==
- Stu Mackenzie – lead vocals, guitar (all tracks); bass (tracks 6, 8, 9), recording, mixing
- Cook Craig – guitar (tracks 2, 4–6, 9), backing vocals (tracks 5–9)
- Joey Walker – bass (tracks 1–5, 7, 8), backing vocals (tracks 3, 5–9), guitar (tracks 6, 9)
- Michael Cavanagh – drums (all tracks); backing vocals (tracks 7–9)
- Ambrose Kenny-Smith – backing vocals (tracks 4–9), harmonica (tracks 2, 6, 9)
- Eric Moore – backing vocals (tracks 8, 9)

Additional personnel

- Michael Badger – recording
- Joe Carra – mastering

== Charts ==
Chart performance for Infest the Rats' Nest
Chart (2019)	Peak position
Australian Albums (ARIA)	2
Belgian Albums (Ultratop Flanders)	85
Belgian Albums (Ultratop Wallonia)	66
Canadian Albums (Billboard)	51
German Albums (Offizielle Top 100)	69
Scottish Albums (Official Charts)	35
UK Independent Albums (Official Charts)	7
US Billboard 200	64
US Top Alternative Albums (Billboard)	5
US Independent Albums (Billboard)	3
US Top Rock Albums (Billboard)	8

== See also ==
- Climate change in popular culture
- Environmentalism in music
- Australian thrash metal
