= Stu Mackenzie =

Australian musician (born 1990)

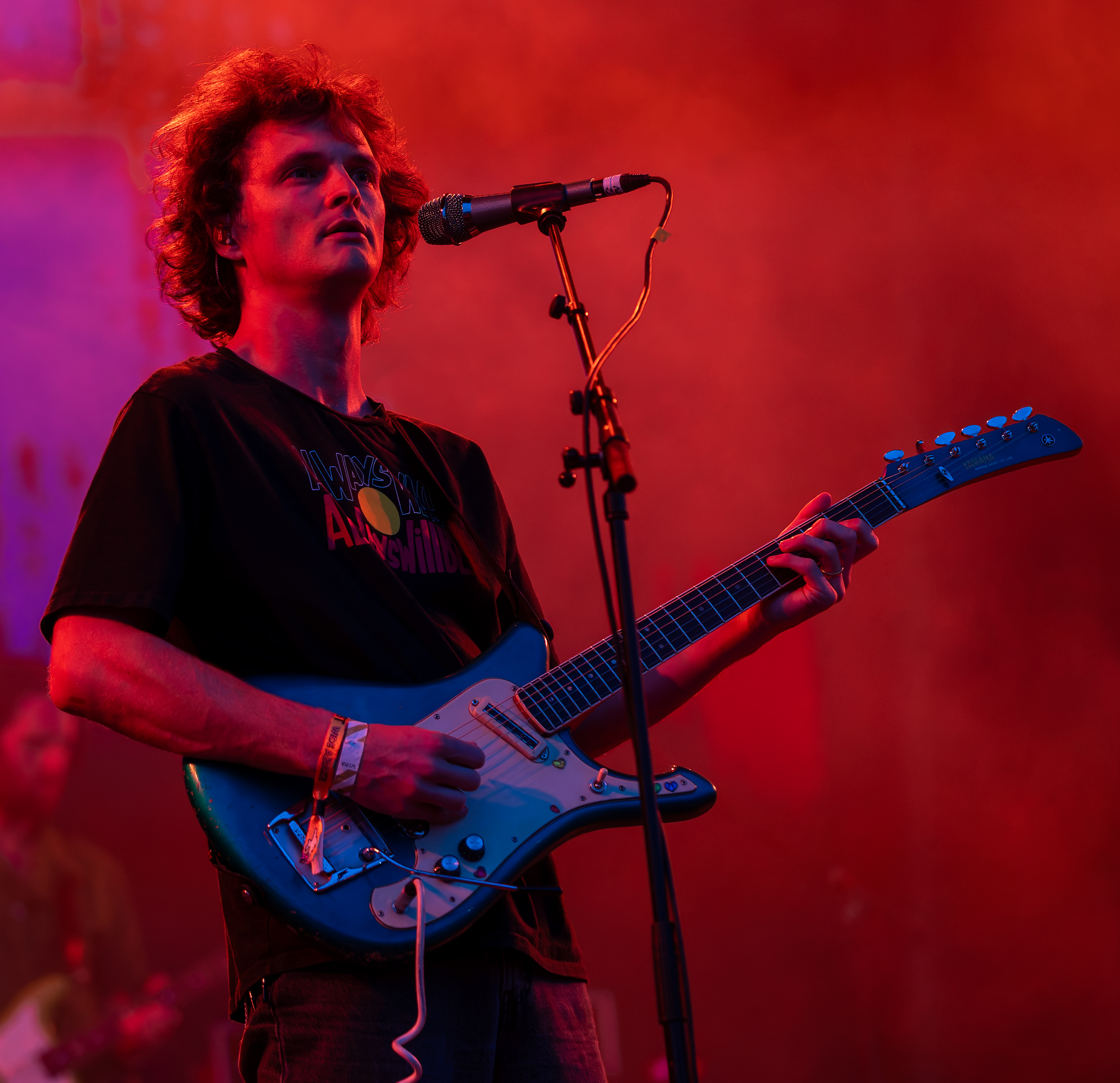
- Mackenzie in 2024
- Born: Stuart Douglas Mackenzie; 26 October 1990 (age 36); Melbourne, Victoria, Australia
- Occupations: Musician; singer; songwriter; record producer
- Years active: 2005–present
- Spouse: Philippa Gleeson (m. 2019)
- Children: 3
- Musical career
- Genres: Psychedelic rock; garage rock; psychedelic pop
- Instruments: Guitar; vocals; bass guitar; keyboards; sitar; flute; drums
- Member of: King Gizzard & the Lizard Wizard

Stuart Douglas Mackenzie (born 26 October 1990) is an Australian musician best known as the frontman of rock band King Gizzard & the Lizard Wizard. He serves as singer, guitarist and multi-instrumentalist for the band and is recognized as its leader, a role he has filled since its formation in 2010.

Mackenzie formed King Gizzard & the Lizard Wizard as a casual band for his friends in the Melbourne music scene to play together in without needing to rehearse or practice. They have since recorded 28 studio albums.

Under his leadership, they have become considered an important band of their generation, attributed to their cultivation of a devoted following through touring and releases.

== Early life ==
Stuart Douglas Mackenzie, was born on 26 October 1990, in Victoria. His mother is a nurse, and his father had worked in environmental policy and local government. The family moved frequently during his childhood, and he spent portions of his childhood in Anglesea and Wangaratta. He was an aspiring Australian rules footballer as a child, and captained a juniors side in Anglesea that included future professional player Patrick Dangerfield. An ACL injury curtailed Mackenzie's playing career.

Mackenzie's first exposures to music came early in life, as his father played songs by Neil Young and Paul Simon on guitar and sang him and his younger brother to sleep. Although that had influence on him, Mackenzie was a "hyperactive, ratty kid" who was more interested in heavy metal. As such, through its association to his father, he found guitar "uncool". It wasn't until seeing videos of AC/DC playing live that he took interest in the instrument, and began playing at the age of 15. A lot of Mackenzie's friends already played instruments, and he felt a drive to "catch up" to his peers so he could join in on their jam sessions.

Around that time, his family moved to Geelong. In his high school years there, Mackenzie joined and formed several bands in the Melbourne music scene, some of which included future King Gizzard members Michael Cavanagh, Lucas Harwood and Cook Craig.

== Career ==
We were not long out of school, and to me, it was starting to get annoyingly serious. I was like, 'Come on, guys - we shouldn't know what we're supposed to be doing now. Let's just make the easiest music possible and have fun and jam'.

— Stu Mackenzie

It was in studying together at RMIT University in Geelong that Mackenzie met guitarist Joey Walker and drummer Eric Moore. The band started off with a fluid lineup of members, but the lineup eventually became Mackenzie, Walker, Moore, Cavanagh, Craig, Harwood, and a final member, Ambrose Kenny-Smith - who was the last to join the band in 2011. Legend has it that the band's name came from a mix of Jim Morrison's nickname "Lizard King", and Mackenzie's suggestion, "Gizzard Gizzard", but Mackenzie has denied this.

The band's first releases were two singles in 2010, both self-released: "Sleep / Summer!" and "Hey There / Ants & Bats". The band's next release, 2011's Anglesea was released as a four-track EP on CD. These releases did not become available digitally until the Teenage Gizzard compilation in 2020. Willoughby's Beach was released by Shock Records on 21 October.

The band's first full-length album, 12 Bar Bruise, was released on 7 September 2012. The 12-track garage rock album was self-recorded, and several tracks used unconventional recording methods; for example, the vocals for the album's title track were recorded through four iPhones placed around a room while Mackenzie sang into one of them.

The band's second full-length album, Eyes Like the Sky, was released on 22 February 2013. Described as a "cult western audio book", the album is narrated by Broderick Smith and tells the story of outlaws, Native Americans, and other figures of the American frontier. It was written collaboratively by Smith and Stu Mackenzie. Mackenzie said the album was inspired by Western films and Red Dead Redemption, as well as "evil guitars".

The band's third full-length album, Float Along – Fill Your Lungs, was released on 27 September 2013. King Gizzard shifted from garage rock to a more mellow folk and psychedelic sound on the eight-track album. It also saw Eric Moore start playing drums after previously playing theremin and keyboards.

Float Along – Fill Your Lungs was followed by Oddments, released on 7 March 2014. Over the course of the 12-track album, the band takes a more melodic approach, and Mackenzie's vocals are more prominent. The album's mixing style led to it being described as "recorded through a woollen sock in an adjacent room".

The band's fifth full-length album, I'm in Your Mind Fuzz, was released on 31 October 2014. The 10-track album touches on elements of fantasy, and lyrically delves into the concept of mind control. This was the first time the band took a "traditional" approach to writing and recording an album: the songs were written, the band rehearsed together, and they recorded the songs "as a band" in the studio. Pitchfork described the album as "open[ing] with a sprint" and ending "with some of their best slow jams".

=== 2015–2016: Quarters!, Paper Mâché Dream Balloon, and Nonagon Infinity ===
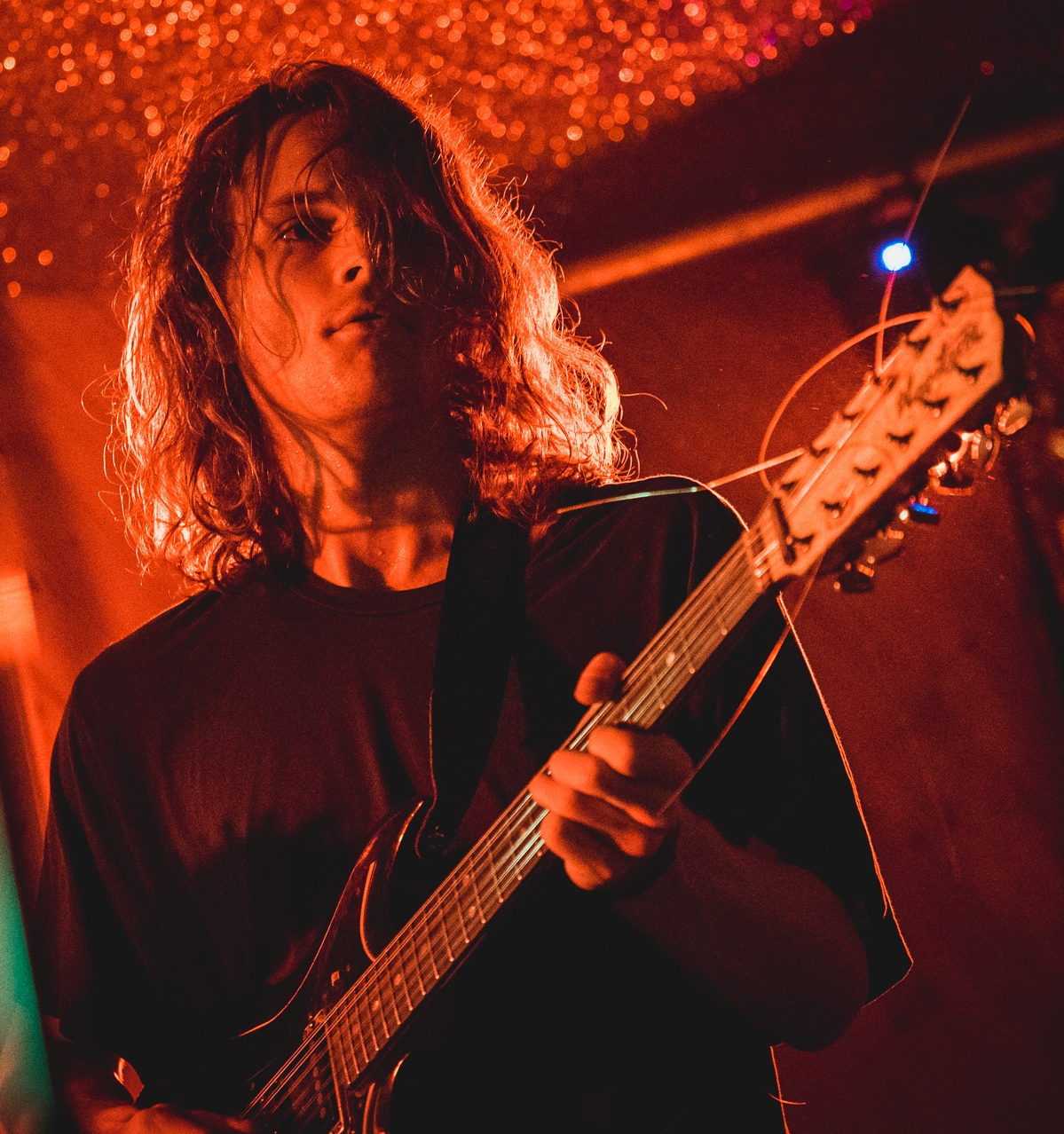
Mackenzie performing in 2016

Quarters!, King Gizzard's sixth full-length album, was released on 1 May 2015. The album features four songs, each running for 10 minutes and 10 seconds, making each song a quarter of the album. Drawing upon jazz fusion and acid rock, the album's more laid-back sound was described as "unlike anything they've released before" by Tonedeaf magazine.

On 17 August, King Gizzard released the title track "Paper Mâché Dream Balloon" as the lead single for the album with the same name. The second single, "Trapdoor", had a music video released on 10 November. On 13 November, the band released its seventh full-length album, Paper Mâché Dream Balloon. It features only acoustic instruments and was recorded on Mackenzie's parents' farm in rural Victoria.

The band's eighth full-length album, Nonagon Infinity, was released worldwide on 29 April 2016. Described by Mackenzie as a "never-ending album", it features nine songs connected by musical motifs that flow "seamlessly" into each other, with the last track "linking straight back into the top of the opener".

=== 2017: Five albums in one year ===
We had this random batch of songs. It was not a cohesive record at all. So we thought we'd split it up and split again until it became five. We worked on Nonagon Infinity pretty intensely in 2015 and 2016. We came close to burning ourselves out, or at least wringing each other's necks. We took a break, and then all these random, disparate song ideas came out of that void of not recording for a little while. Then we worked on everything, one album at a time.

— Stu Mackenzie, November 2017

The band's ninth full-length album, Flying Microtonal Banana, was recorded in the band's own studio and released on 24 February 2017. The album was recorded using custom instruments adhering to 24 TET. The music video for "Rattlesnake", directed by Jason Galea, was described by Happy Mag's Luke Saunders as "a masterclass in hypnotism".

Another full-length album, Murder of the Universe, was released on 23 June. It is a concept album divided into three chapters: The Tale of the Altered Beast and The Lord of Lightning vs. Balrog (released on 30 May), and Han-Tyumi and the Murder of the Universe (11 April). Spill Magazine explained that the album "describes the impeding doom of the world in a dark fantasy genre kind of way". It is narrated by Leah Senior for the first two chapters, and a text-to-speech program for the final chapter. The band made their international television debut on 17 April, performing "The Lord of Lightning" on Conan on TBS in the United States.

The album Sketches of Brunswick East was released on 18 August 2017. It is a collaboration with Alex Brettin's psychedelic jazz project, Mild High Club. Taking inspiration from Miles Davis' 1960 album Sketches of Spain, as well as the band's base recording location of Brunswick East in Melbourne, it is a jazz improvisational album. Mackenzie described the record as relating to the constant changes in their neighborhood, and trying to finding beauty in the location.

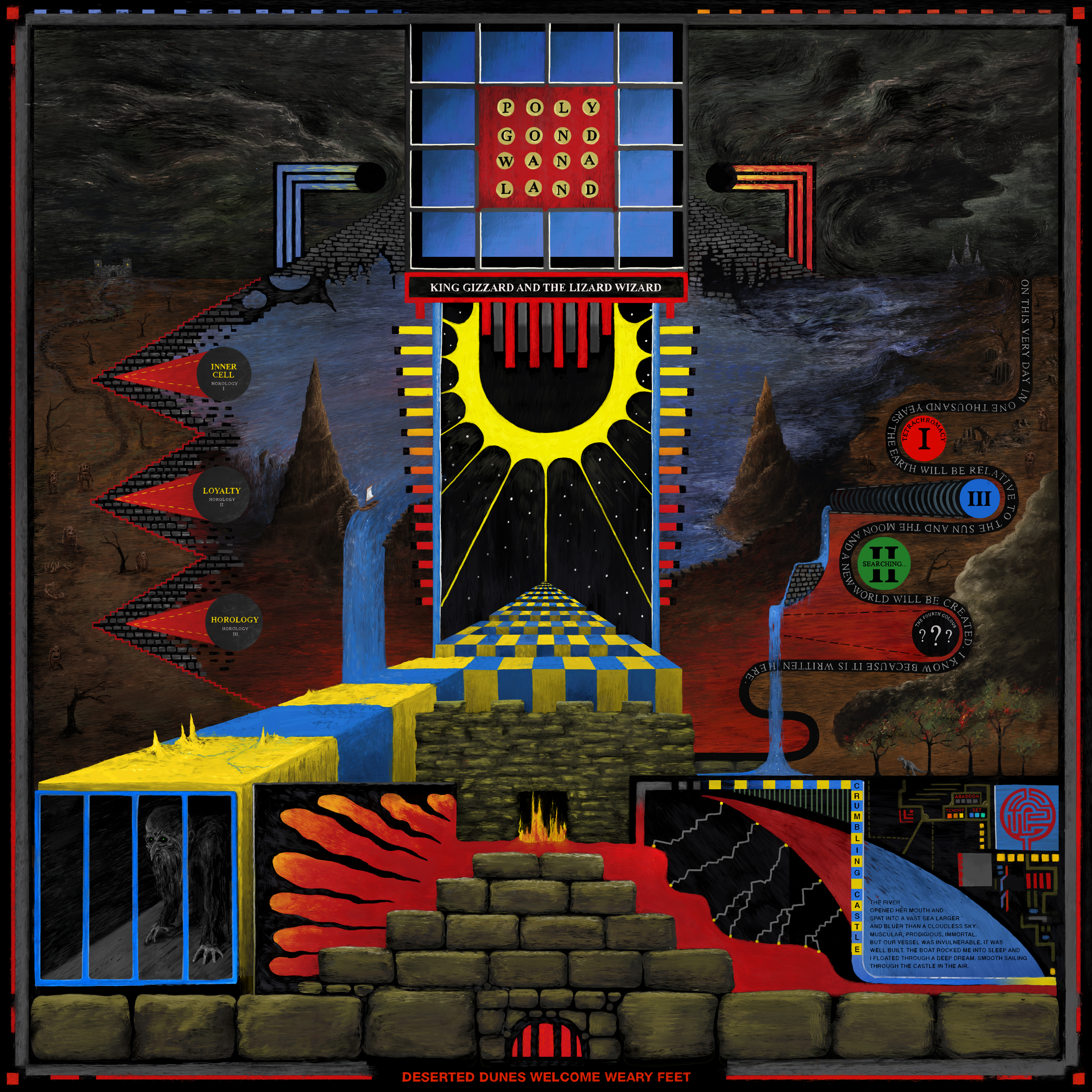
Polygondwanaland, the fourth of the band's five 2017 albums, was released into the public domain, inspiring many independent labels throughout the world to issue unique versions of it.

The album Polygondwanaland was released as a free download on 17 November. The band encouraged fans and independent record labels to create their own pressings of the album, stating that it was "free to download and if you wish, free to make copies".

In December, the band announced a new album, and two singles were released digitally: "All Is Known", which had previously been performed live, and "Beginner's Luck", an entirely new song. These singles were followed by two more: "The Last Oasis" and "Greenhouse Heat Death" on the 20th. Gumboot Soup was released on 31 December. Mackenzie explained in an interview that the songs on the album were songs that didn't work in, or came after, the other 2017 records, but that they were not b-sides.

=== 2018–2019: Fishing for Fishies and Infest the Rats' Nest ===
In March, the band announced the album Fishing for Fishies, with a release date of 26 April. A day later, the band officially released a music video for the title track on YouTube. Later that month, the band released another single from the album, "Boogieman Sam", and on 24 April, the band dropped a final single, "The Bird Song". Two days later, the album was released. Mackenzie has stated that the album was "strangely one of the hardest records to make – that we've ever made. The songs would just keep on changing, over and over and over and over again. They were stitched together, mashed together, stretched, warped… Just bizarre things."

On 9 April, the band released a music video for their new song, "Planet B". On the 30th, Mackenzie confirmed that the band's next album (featuring "Planet B") was in the works, and had no release date yet. The album was later revealed to be titled Infest the Rats' Nest. Mackenzie also announced that Gizzfest would be held outside of Australia for the first time that year. Infest the Rats' Nest, which was released on 16 August, featured an entirely different style – thrash metal.

=== 2020: K.G. and L.W. ===
In April, the band stated that during the COVID-19 lockdown, they had worked on new material for upcoming albums. Mackenzie reported that one will be "chill", another "kind of jazzy", and some of it microtonal. The band was also experimenting with electronic music and polymetres. When asked about more live recordings, Mackenzie said that the band had recorded almost every show they played in 2019, and may release them in a similar fashion to Pearl Jam's official live bootlegs.

On 20 October, the band teased the release of their 16th studio album, K.G. (Explorations into Microtonal Tuning, Volume 2). The album released on November 20th, 2020, alongside the fourth single from K.G., "Automation", which was for free on their website. In addition to the raw audio files for the song as a whole, the band also included the files for the separate stems within the song. They also released the video files for its music video, and asked fans to create their own video with them. All of these files require a torrent client to be installed on the user's device.

The album L.W. (Explorations into Microtonal Tuning, Volume 3), was released on February 25th, 2021. It is "both a standalone work and a companion piece to" K.G. On 19 March, the band released Live in Melbourne '21, recorded from one of their first shows since the pandemic. It also was released as bootleg files.

=== 2021–2022: Butterfly 3000, Omnium Gatherum, and Gizztober ===
The album Butterfly 3000, was announced on 11 May, saying it would release on 11 June without promotion by singles. They announced five concerts at Sydney's Carriageworks, which would have different, pre-planned setlists themed around a different style of music. Butterfly 3000 received generally positive reviews; reviewers commending the album on its "sonic adventurism" and "pop-oriented additions [that] are a perfect pairing to their existing sound", while another said its "formulaic approach lacks surprise". The album had 10 tracks, and was built around modular synthesizer loops. The album art by Jason Galea featured a "cross-eyed" autostereogram.

In February, the band announced a three-hour marathon set in Melbourne on 5 March, named Return of the Curse of Timeland. It coincided with the release of the album Made in Timeland. On 8 March, they released the 18-minute track "The Dripping Tap" as a single from the album Omnium Gatherum, released on 22 April.

In August, they cancelled the remaining 13 dates of their summer European tour so Stu Mackenzie could return to Australia for treatment in his battle with Crohn's disease.

On 1 September, the band announced that they planned to release three studio albums in October 2022. A music video for one of their new songs, "Ice V", premiered on the 7th, alongside the reveal of the titles, cover artwork, and release dates for the albums. They all released in October: Ice, Death, Planets, Lungs, Mushrooms and Lava on the 7th, Laminated Denim on the 12th, and Changes on the 28th. Fans labeled the month "Gizztober".

=== 2023–present: PetroDragonic Apocalypse, The Silver Cord, p(doom), Flight b741 and Phantom Island ===
In May, the band announced the album PetroDragonic Apocalypse; or, Dawn of Eternal Night: An Annihilation of Planet Earth and the Beginning of Merciless Damnation Lucas Harwood said the album would be one of two upcoming releases exploring a "Yin and Yang" concept. They would sound much different from each other, but complement each other. The album's first single, "Gila Monster", was released alongside a music video on 16 May, and the second single, "Dragon", was released on 6 June with its music video. The band then went on tour throughout the United States to promote the album. PetroDragonic Apocalypse was released on 16 June.

In July, the band confirmed that they had been uploading albums from their bootlegger program onto streaming services under the name "bootleg gizzard". In September, they announced a series of marathon tours in the U.S. for 2024, and said that the album accompanying PetroDragonic Apocalypse is "synth-y". In September, they announced the album was named The Silver Cord. On 3 October, they premiered three of its singles ("Theia", "The Silver Cord", and "Set"), and a music video on YouTube. The album was released on the 27th. On 6 May 2024, the band announced their new label, p(doom) Records, which they named after the artificial intelligence concept of P(doom). On 1 July 2024, the band announced that their 26th studio album, Flight b741, will be released on 9 August 2024. It was their first album released on the p(doom) label. They released their 27th album, Phantom Island, on June 13th, 2025, as their second album on the label.

On December 2, 2025, Mackenzie released a solo album under King Gizzard's name through the band's bootlegger program, titled Mango Sticky Rice. The album consists of an hour and a half of ambient electronic music created by Mackenzie using generative synthesisers, following on the band's increasing use of modular synths. The music was used throughout November in the pre-roll intros to the band's livestreamed performances on their 2025 rave tour before being released on Bandcamp.

== Artistry ==
I love Stu's whole approach to writing. It feels so loose and all about the hang, which is the way I came into music—jamming with friends, trying things out and not getting precious. I always just wanted to be with my friends jamming, and I get that same vibe from King Gizz. I immediately loved them and could relate.

— Trey Anastasio

Mackenzie is often noted for his work ethic. He is credited for the band's fast-paced release schedule; further, since the band's beginning, he has been treated as its "director". He attributes this to a need to always be creating, saying "It's hard to stop, but I also realize it's a problem I have. When I go on holiday and decide not to write, I'll do something like 500 sudokus. I have to be filling my brain with something."

He deliberately avoids perfectionism, and does not try to better himself as he feels he would be too scared to start. He said: "I've never tried to say I'm going to make the best record I've ever made. I've never tried to say I'm going to write the best song I've ever written because I will do nothing. If I say that to myself, I will go hide under my bed and cry."

== Personal life ==
Mackenzie confirmed in a Reddit AMA that he is vegan, which inspired some of the songs on the album Fishing for Fishies. He has also stated in an AMA that he does not believe in a God. Mackenzie married model Philippa Gleeson in 2019. They have two children and live in Melbourne.

In 2022, Mackenzie announced that he suffers from Crohn's disease, and that the remainder of King Gizzard's European summer tour would be cancelled due to him seeking treatment amidst a "personal health crisis".
