= List of songs recorded by King Gizzard & the Lizard Wizard =

The following is a list of songs by King Gizzard and the Lizard Wizard.

== Songs ==
Title	Year	Album	Length	Writer(s)
12 Bar Bruise	2012	12 Bar Bruise	3:47	Stu Mackenzie
2.02 Killer Year	2021	Butterfly 3000	3:19	Ambrose Kenny-Smith, Stu Mackenzie
30 Past 7	2013	Float Along - Fill Your Lungs	3:43	Stu Mackenzie
A Brief History of Planet Earth	2020	Chunky Shrapnel	19:03	Stu Mackenzie, Ambrose Kenny-Smith, Joey Walker, Michael Cavanagh, Cook Craig, Lucas Harwood, Cal Shortal, Amy Findlay, Hannah Findlay, Holly Findlay, Sarah Findlay, Daff Gravolin, Jamie Harmer, Zak Olsen, Eric Moore
A Journey to S(Hell)	2017	Sketches of Brunswick East	2:16	Joey Walker, Stu Mackenzie
A New World	2017	Murder of the Universe	0:57	Stu Mackenzie
ABABCd.	2014	Oddments	0:17	Joey Walker
Acarine	2019	Fishing for Fishies	5:24	Joey Walker, Stu Mackenzie
Aerodynamic	2025	Phantom Island	4:47	Michael Cavanagh, Cook Craig, Lucas Harwood, Ambrose Kenny-Smith, Stu Mackenzie, Joey Walker
Alien Metal	2026	Alien Metal	5:08	Stu Mackenzie, Ambrose Kenny-Smith, Joey Walker
All Is Known	2017	Gumboot Soup	3:34	Stu Mackenzie
Alluda Majaka	2014	Oddments	3:34	Stu Mackenzie
Alter Me I	2017	Murder of the Universe	0:45	Stu Mackenzie
Alter Me II	2017	Murder of the Universe	1:25	Stu Mackenzie
Alter Me III	2017	Murder of the Universe	1:26	Stu Mackenzie
Altered Beast I	2017	Murder of the Universe	2:23	Stu Mackenzie
Altered Beast II	2017	Murder of the Universe	4:28	Stu Mackenzie
Altered Beast III	2017	Murder of the Universe	2:14	Stu Mackenzie
Altered Beast IV	2017	Murder of the Universe	5:10	Stu Mackenzie
Am I in Heaven	2014	I'm in Your Mind Fuzz	7:06	Stu Mackenzie
Ambergris	2022	Omnium Gatherum	4:27	Joey Walker
Anamnesis	2020	Chunky Shrapnel	3:10	Stu Mackenzie
Anoxia	2017	Flying Microtonal Banana	3:04	Joey Walker
Antarctica	2024	Flight b741	4:32	Joey Walker, Michael Cavanagh, Lucas Harwood, Cook Craig, Stu Mackenzie, Ambrose Kenny-Smith
Ants and Bats	2010	Teenage Gizzard	3:11	Stu Mackenzie
Astroturf	2022	Changes	7:33	Michael Cavanagh, Stu Mackenzie
Ataraxia	2021	L.W.	5:18	Joey Walker
Atomic Collapse	2026	Alien Metal	6:29	Stu Mackenzie, Ambrose Kenny-Smith, Joey Walker
Automation	2020	K.G.	3:30	Stu Mackenzie
Barefoot Desert	2017	Gumboot Soup	3:43	Ambrose Kenny-Smith, Cook Craig, Stu Mackenzie
Beginner's Luck	2017	Gumboot Soup	4:25	Ambrose Kenny-Smith, Stu Mackenzie
Big Fig Wasp	2016	Nonagon Infinity	4:54	Stu Mackenzie
Billabong Valley	2017	Flying Microtonal Banana	3:34	Ambrose Kenny-Smith, Stu Mackenzie
Black Hot Soup	2021	Butterfly 3000	5:12	Stu Mackenzie
Black Tooth	2011	Willoughby's Beach	2:30	Stu Mackenzie
Blame It On The Weather	2022	Omnium Gatherum	2:31	Ambrose Kenny-Smith, Joey Walker, Michael Cavanagh, Stu Mackenzie
Bloody Ripper	2012	12 Bar Bruise	2:13	Stu Mackenzie
Blue Morpho	2021	Butterfly 3000	3:51	Stu Mackenzie
Bone	2015	Paper Mâché Dream Balloon	2:16	Stu Mackenzie
Boogieman Sam	2019	Fishing for Fishies	4:41	Stu Mackenzie
Butterfly 3000	2021	Butterfly 3000	2:51	Stu Mackenzie
Candles	2022	Omnium Gatherum	4:34	Stu Mackenzie
Catching Smoke	2021	Butterfly 3000	6:28	Joey Walker, Stu Mackenzie
Cellophane	2014	I'm in Your Mind Fuzz	3:11	Stu Mackenzie
Chang'e	2023	The Silver Cord	3:47	Joey Walker, Michael Cavanagh, Lucas Harwood, Cook Craig, Stu Mackenzie, Ambrose Kenny-Smith
Chang'e (Extended Mix)	2023	The Silver Cord	10:47	Joey Walker, Michael Cavanagh, Lucas Harwood, Cook Craig, Stu Mackenzie, Ambrose Kenny-Smith
Change	2022	Changes	13:03	Ambrose Kenny-Smith, Cook Craig, Joey Walker, Stu Mackenzie
Cold Cadaver	2015	Paper Mâché Dream Balloon	2:43	Stu Mackenzie
Converge	2023	PetroDragonic Apocalypse; or, Dawn of Eternal Night: An Annihilation of Planet Earth and the Beginning of Merciless Damnation	6:16	Ambrose Kenny-Smith, Cook Craig, Joey Walker, Lucas Harwood, Michael Cavanagh, Stu Mackenzie
Countdown	2017	Sketches of Brunswick East	3:22	Alex Brettin, Michael Cavanagh, Stu Mackenzie
Cranes, Planes, Migraines	2017	Sketches of Brunswick East	1:15	Joey Walker, Stu Mackenzie
Crookedile	2011	Willoughby's Beach	2:30	Stu Mackenzie
Crumbling Castle	2017	Polygondwanaland	10:46	Stu Mackenzie
Crying	2014	Oddments	2:56	Cook Craig
Cut Throat Boogie	2012	12 Bar Bruise	2:50	Stu Mackenzie, Ambrose Kenny-Smith
Cyboogie	2019	Fishing for Fishies	6:48	Stu Mackenzie
D-Day	2017	Sketches of Brunswick East	1:38	Stu Mackenzie
Daily Blues	2024	Flight b741	7:42	Joey Walker, Michael Cavanagh, Lucas Harwood, Cook Craig, Stu Mackenzie, Ambrose Kenny-Smith
Danger $$$	2011	Willoughby's Beach	1:45	Stu Mackenzie
Dawn of Eternal Night	2023	PetroDragonic Apocalypse; or, Dawn of Eternal Night: An Annihilation of Planet Earth and the Beginning of Merciless Damnation	14:22	Stu Mackenzie
Dead-Beat	2011	Willoughby's Beach	3:01	Stu Mackenzie
Deadstick	2025	Phantom Island	3:34	Michael Cavanagh, Cook Craig, Lucas Harwood, Ambrose Kenny-Smith, Stu Mackenzie, Joey Walker
Deserted Dunes Welcome Weary Feet	2017	Polygondwanaland	3:34	Joey Walker, Michael Cavanagh, Stu Mackenzie
Digital Black	2017	Murder of the Universe	2:46	Stu Mackenzie
Dirt	2015	Paper Mâché Dream Balloon	2:50	Joey Walker
Doom City	2017	Flying Microtonal Banana	3:14	Stu Mackenzie
Down the Sink	2017	Gumboot Soup	3:59	Cook Craig
Dragon	2023	PetroDragonic Apocalypse; or, Dawn of Eternal Night: An Annihilation of Planet Earth and the Beginning of Merciless Damnation	9:45	Ambrose Kenny-Smith, Cook Craig, Joey Walker, Michael Cavanagh, Stu Mackenzie
Dreams	2021	Butterfly 3000	4:04	Stu Mackenzie
Drum Run	2013	Eyes Like The Sky	2:42	Broderick Smith, Stu Mackenzie
Dusk to Dawn on Lygon Street	2017	Sketches of Brunswick East	3:02	Alex Brettin, Cook Craig, Stu Mackenzie
Dust In The Wind	2013	Eyes Like The Sky	2:24	Broderick Smith, Stu Mackenzie
Dustbin Fletcher	2011	Willoughby's Beach	3:09	Stu Mackenzie
East West Link	2021	L.W.	3:09	Stu Mackenzie
Eddie Cousin	2010	Anglesea EP	2:38	Stu Mackenzie
Elbow	2012	12 Bar Bruise	2:40	Stu Mackenzie
Embryo	2023	The Silver Cord	4:07	Joey Walker, Michael Cavanagh, Lucas Harwood, Cook Craig, Stu Mackenzie, Ambrose Kenny-Smith
Empty	2014	I'm in Your Mind Fuzz	4:11	Stu Mackenzie
Eternal Return	2025	Phantom Island	4:34	Michael Cavanagh, Cook Craig, Lucas Harwood, Ambrose Kenny-Smith, Stu Mackenzie, Joey Walker
Evil Death Roll	2016	Nonagon Infinity	7:14	Stu Mackenzie
Evil Man	2013	Eyes Like The Sky	3:54	Broderick Smith, Stu Mackenzie
Evil Star	2020	Chunky Shrapnel	2:09	Joey Walker, Stu Mackenzie
Evilest Man	2022	Omnium Gatherum	7:38	Stu Mackenzie
Exploding Suns	2022	Changes	4:40	Ambrose Kenny-Smith, Stu Mackenzie
Extinction	2023	The Silver Cord	4:40	Joey Walker, Michael Cavanagh, Lucas Harwood, Cook Craig, Stu Mackenzie, Ambrose Kenny-Smith
Extinction (Extended Mix)	2023	The Silver Cord	12:28	Joey Walker, Michael Cavanagh, Lucas Harwood, Cook Craig, Stu Mackenzie, Ambrose Kenny-Smith
Eyes Like The Sky	2013	Eyes Like The Sky	3:17	Broderick Smith, Stu Mackenzie
Field of Vision	2024	Flight b741	3:35	Joey Walker, Michael Cavanagh, Lucas Harwood, Cook Craig, Stu Mackenzie, Ambrose Kenny-Smith
Fishing for Fishies	2019	Fishing for Fishies	5:01	Ambrose Kenny-Smith, Stu Mackenzie
Flamethrower	2023	PetroDragonic Apocalypse; or, Dawn of Eternal Night: An Annihilation of Planet Earth and the Beginning of Merciless Damnation	9:21	Ambrose Kenny-Smith, Cook Craig, Joey Walker, Michael Cavanagh, Stu Mackenzie
Flight b741	2024	Flight b741	3:58	Lucas Harwood, Stu Mackenzie, Cook Craig, Joey Walker, Michael Cavanagh, Ambrose Kenny-Smith
Float Along - Fill Your Lungs	2013	Float Along - Fill Your Lungs	6:45	Stu Mackenzie
Flying Microtonal Banana	2017	Flying Microtonal Banana	2:34	Joey Walker, Stu Mackenzie
Footy Footy	2012	12 Bar Bruise	1:59	Joey Walker, Stu Mackenzie
Fort Whipple	2013	Eyes Like The Sky	2:56	Stu Mackenzie, Broderick Smith
Fried	2010	Anglesea EP	3:10	Stu Mackenzie
Gaia	2022	Omnium Gatherum	5:11	Joey Walker, Michael Cavanagh, Stu Mackenzie
Gamma Knife	2016	Nonagon Infinity	4:21	Stu Mackenzie
Garage Liddiard	2012	12 Bar Bruise	2:29	Stu Mackenzie
Gila Monster	2023	PetroDragonic Apocalypse; or, Dawn of Eternal Night: An Annihilation of Planet Earth and the Beginning of Merciless Damnation	4:36	Ambrose Kenny-Smith, Cook Craig, Joey Walker, Michael Cavanagh, Stu Mackenzie
Gilgamesh	2023	The Silver Cord	3:44	Joey Walker, Michael Cavanagh, Lucas Harwood, Cook Craig, Stu Mackenzie, Ambrose Kenny-Smith
Gilgamesh (Extended Mix)	2023	The Silver Cord	11:17	Joey Walker, Michael Cavanagh, Lucas Harwood, Cook Craig, Stu Mackenzie, Ambrose Kenny-Smith
Gliese 710	2022	Ice, Death, Planets, Lungs, Mushrooms and Lava	7:48	Ambrose Kenny-Smith, Cook Craig, Joey Walker, Lucas Harwood, Michael Cavanagh, Stu Mackenzie
God Is Calling Me Back Home	2013	Float Along - Fill Your Lungs	4:24	Stu Mackenzie
God Is in the Rhythm	2015	Quarters!	10:10	Stu Mackenzie
Gondii	2022	Changes	4:57	Stu Mackenzie
Good to Me	2010	Anglesea EP	2:23	Stu Mackenzie
Greenhouse Heat Death	2017	Gumboot Soup	4:13	Stu Mackenzie
Grow Wings and Fly	2025	Phantom Island	5:08	Michael Cavanagh, Cook Craig, Lucas Harwood, Ambrose Kenny-Smith, Stu Mackenzie, Joey Walker
Guns & Horses	2013	Eyes Like The Sky	1:08	Broderick Smith, Stu Mackenzie
Han-Tyumi, the Confused Cyborg	2017	Murder of the Universe	2:21	Joey Walker, Stu Mackenzie
Hate Dancin'	2022	Changes	3:16	Ambrose Kenny-Smith, Stu Mackenzie
Head On/Pill	2013	Float Along - Fill Your Lungs	15:59	Stu Mackenzie
Hell	2019	Infest The Rat's Nest	3:38	Joey Walker, Michael Cavanagh, Stu Mackenzie
Hell's Itch	2022	Ice, Death, Planets, Lungs, Mushrooms and Lava	13:28	Ambrose Kenny-Smith, Cook Craig, Joey Walker, Michael Cavanagh, Stu Mackenzie
Her & I (Slow Jam II)	2014	I'm in Your Mind Fuzz	8:15	Stu Mackenzie
Hey There	2010	Teenage Gizzard	3:50	Stu Mackenzie
High Hopes Low	2012	12 Bar Bruise	3:46	Stu Mackenzie
Hog Calling Contest	2024	Flight b741	3:21	Joey Walker, Michael Cavanagh, Lucas Harwood, Cook Craig, Stu Mackenzie, Ambrose Kenny-Smith
Homeless Man In Adidas	2014	Oddments	3:24	Stu Mackenzie
Honey	2020	K.G.	4:34	Stu Mackenzie
Horology	2017	Polygondwanaland	2:52	Joey Walker, Michael Cavanagh, Stu Mackenzie
Hot Water	2014	I'm in Your Mind Fuzz	3:24	Joey Walker, Stu Mackenzie
Hot Wax	2014	Oddments	3:29	Ambrose Kenny-Smith, Stu Mackenzie
Hypertension	2022	Laminated Denim	15:00	Ambrose Kenny-Smith, Cook Craig, Joey Walker, Michael Cavanagh, Stu Mackenzie
I'm in Your Mind	2014	I'm in Your Mind Fuzz	3:34	Stu Mackenzie
I'm in Your Mind Fuzz	2014	I'm in Your Mind Fuzz	2:52	Stu Mackenzie
I'm Not a Man Unless I Have A Woman	2013	Float Along - Fill Your Lungs	2:54	Stu Mackenzie
I'm Not in Your Mind	2014	I'm in Your Mind Fuzz	2:58	Stu Mackenzie
I'm Sleepin' In	2017	Gumboot Soup	3:00	Stu Mackenzie
Ice V	2022	Ice, Death, Planets, Lungs, Mushrooms and Lava	10:16	Ambrose Kenny-Smith, Cook Craig, Joey Walker, Lucas Harwood, Michael Cavanagh, Stu Mackenzie
If Not Now, Then When?	2021	L.W.	3:50	Stu Mackenzie
Infinite Rise	2015	Quarters!	10:10	Stu Mackenzie
Inner Cell	2017	Polygondwanaland	3:56	Joey Walker, Michael Cavanagh, Stu Mackenzie
Interior People	2021	Butterfly 3000	5:15	Joey Walker, Stu Mackenzie
Intrasport	2020	K.G.	4:13	Joey Walker
Invisible Face	2016	Nonagon Infinity	3:01	Stu Mackenzie
Iron Lung	2022	Ice, Death, Planets, Lungs, Mushrooms and Lava	9:05	Ambrose Kenny-Smith, Cook Craig, Joey Walker, Michael Cavanagh, Stu Mackenzie
It's Got Old	2014	Oddments	2:58	Stu Mackenzie
K.G.L.W.	2020	K.G.	1:37	Stu Mackenzie
K.G.L.W.	2021	L.W.	8:28	Stu Mackenzie
Kepler 22-b	2022	Omnium Gatherum	3:12	Barney McAll, Cook Craig, Stu Mackenzie
Kill For The Steel	2026	Alien Metal	3:51	Stu Mackenzie, Ambrose Kenny-Smith, Joey Walker
Lava	2022	Ice, Death, Planets, Lungs, Mushrooms and Lava	6:41	Ambrose Kenny-Smith, Cook Craig, Joey Walker, Lucas Harwood, Michael Cavanagh, Stu Mackenzie
Le Risque	2024	Flight b741	3:34	Ambrose Kenny-Smith, Cook Craig, Joey Walker, Michael Cavanagh, Stu Mackenzie
Let It Bleed	2011	Willoughby's Beach	3:13	Stu Mackenzie
Let Me Mend The Past	2013	Float Along - Fill Your Lungs	2:30	Ambrose Kenny-Smith, Stu Mackenzie
Level 5	2026	Alien Metal	5:35	Stu Mackenzie, Ambrose Kenny-Smith, Joey Walker
Life / Death	2017	Murder of the Universe	1:00	Stu Mackenzie
Life is Cool	2020	Teenage Gizzard	2:11	Stu Mackenzie
Lonely Cosmos	2025	Phantom Island	5:35	Michael Cavanagh, Cook Craig, Ambrose Kenny-Smith, Stu Mackenzie, Joey Walker
Lonely Steel Sheet Flyer	2015	Quarters!	10:10	Stu Mackenzie
Loyalty	2017	Polygondwanaland	3:39	Joey Walker, Michael Cavanagh, Stu Mackenzie
Lunch Meat	2011	Willoughby's Beach	1:40	Stu Mackenzie
Magenta Mountain	2022	Omnium Gatherum	6:04	Ambrose Kenny-Smith, Joey Walker, Stu Mackenzie
Magma	2022	Ice, Death, Planets, Lungs, Mushrooms and Lava	9:06	Ambrose Kenny-Smith, Cook Craig, Joey Walker, Michael Cavanagh, Stu Mackenzie
Mars For The Rich	2019	Infest The Rat's Nest	4:11	Joey Walker, Michael Cavanagh, Stu Mackenzie
Melting	2017	Flying Microtonal Banana	5:27	Stu Mackenzie
Minimum Brain Size	2020	K.G.	4:19	Joey Walker
Mirage City	2024	Flight b741	4:48	Joey Walker, Michael Cavanagh, Lucas Harwood, Cook Craig, Stu Mackenzie, Ambrose Kenny-Smith
Most of What I Like	2015	Paper Mâché Dream Balloon	3:17	Joey Walker
Motor Spirit	2023	PetroDragonic Apocalypse; or, Dawn of Eternal Night: An Annihilation of Planet Earth and the Beginning of Merciless Damnation	8:33	Ambrose Kenny-Smith, Cook Craig, Joey Walker, Michael Cavanagh, Lucas Harwood, Stu Mackenzie
Mr. Beat	2016	Nonagon Infinity	4:56	Stu Mackenzie
Muckraker	2012	12 Bar Bruise	3:00	Stu Mackenzie
Muddy Water	2017	Gumboot Soup	3:38	Joey Walker, Stu Mackenzie
Murder of the Universe	2017	Murder of the Universe	4:09	Joey Walker, Stu Mackenzie
Mycelium	2022	Ice, Death, Planets, Lungs, Mushrooms and Lava	7:36	Ambrose Kenny-Smith, Cook Craig, Joey Walker, Michael Cavanagh, Stu Mackenzie
Mystery Jack	2013	Float Along - Fill Your Lungs	2:48	Stu Mackenzie
N.G.R.I (Bloodstain)	2015	Paper Mâché Dream Balloon	2:25	Stu Mackenzie
Nein	2012	12 Bar Bruise	2:52	Stu Mackenzie
No Body	2022	Changes	3:42	Stu Mackenzie
Nuclear Fusion	2017	Flying Microtonal Banana	4:15	Joey Walker, Stu Mackenzie
O.N.E.	2021	L.W.	3:40	Stu Mackenzie
Oddlife	2020	K.G.	4:58	Ambrose Kenny-Smith, Stu Mackenzie
Oddments	2014	Oddments	0:25	Stu Mackenzie
Ontology	2020	K.G.	3:58	Stu Mackenzie
Open Water	2017	Flying Microtonal Banana	7:13	Stu Mackenzie
Organ Farmer	2019	Infest The Rat's Nest	2:39	Joey Walker, Michael Cavanagh, Stu Mackenzie
Panpsych	2025	Phantom Island	4:02	Michael Cavanagh, Cook Craig, Lucas Harwood, Ambrose Kenny-Smith, Stu Mackenzie, Joey Walker
Paper Mâché	2015	Paper Mâché Dream Balloon	2:29	Cook Craig, Joey Walker, Stu Mackenzie
Paper Mâché Dream Balloon	2015	Paper Mâché Dream Balloon	2:39	Stu Mackenzie
Parking	2020	Chunky Shrapnel	2:02	Michael Cavanagh
People-Vultures	2016	Nonagon Infinity	4:45	Stu Mackenzie
Perihelion	2019	Infest The Rat's Nest	3:11	Joey Walker, Michael Cavanagh, Stu Mackenzie
Persistence	2022	Omnium Gatherum	3:47	Cook Craig, Stu Mackenzie
Phantom Island	2024	Phantom Island	5:16	Michael Cavanagh, Cook Craig, Lucas Harwood, Ambrose Kenny-Smith, Stu Mackenzie, Joey Walker
Pipe-Dream	2014	Oddments	1:01	Cook Craig
Planet B	2019	Infest The Rat's Nest	3:56	Stu Mackenzie
Plasma	2023	The Silver Cord	3:09	Joey Walker, Michael Cavanagh, Lucas Harwood, Cook Craig, Stu Mackenzie, Ambrose Kenny-Smith
Plastic Boogie	2019	Fishing for Fishies	3:03	Stu Mackenzie
Pleura	2021	L.W.	4:11	Joey Walker, Stu Mackenzie
Polygondwanaland	2017	Polygondwanaland	3:33	Stu Mackenzie
Pop In My Step	2013	Float Along - Fill Your Lungs	2:50	Cook Craig
Predator X	2022	Omnium Gatherum	3:45	Stu Mackenzie
Presumptuous	2022	Omnium Gatherum	4:53	Ambrose Kenny-Smith, Stu Mackenzie
Quarantine	2020	Chunky Shrapnel	2:00	Stu Mackenzie
Rapid Alpha Decay	2026	Alien Metal	4:31	Stu Mackenzie, Ambrose Kenny-Smith, Joey Walker
Rats in the Sky	2024	Flight b741	3:07	Ambrose Kenny-Smith, Stu Mackenzie, Cook Craig, Joey Walker, Michael Cavanagh, Lucas Harwood
Rattlesnake	2017	Flying Microtonal Banana	7:48	Stu Mackenzie
Raw Feel	2024	Flight b741	4:17	Joey Walker, Michael Cavanagh, Lucas Harwood, Cook Craig, Stu Mackenzie, Ambrose Kenny-Smith
Real's Not Real	2019	Fishing for Fishies	3:40	Stu Mackenzie
Red Smoke	2022	Omnium Gatherum	4:21	Ambrose Kenny-Smith
Road Train	2016	Nonagon Infinity	4:18	Stu Mackenzie
Robot Stop	2016	Nonagon Infinity	5:22	Stu Mackenzie
Rogue Wave	2026	Entropy	5:36	Stu Mackenzie, Ambrose Kenny-Smith, Joey Walker, Cook Craig, Lucas Harwood, Michael Cavanagh
Rolling Stoned	2017	Sketches of Brunswick East	3:18	Alex Brettin
Sad Pilot	2024	Flight b741	4:12	Joey Walker, Ambrose Kenny-Smith, Stu Mackenzie, Michael Cavanagh, Cook Craig
Sadie Sorceress	2022	Omnium Gatherum	3:07	Ambrose Kenny-Smith, Barry Mason, Joey Walker, Les Reed, Stu Mackenzie
Sam Cherry's Last Shot	2012	12 Bar Bruise	2:49	Stu Mackenzie
Sapience	2026	Alien Metal	4:41	Stu Mackenzie, Ambrose Kenny-Smith, Joey Walker
Satan Speeds Up	2014	I'm in Your Mind Fuzz	3:39	Stu Mackenzie
Satanic Slumber Party Part 1 (The Chairman's Portrait)	2022	Satanic Slumber Party	0:54	Ambrose Kenny-Smith, Cook Craig, Erica Dunn, Fiona Kitschin, Gareth Liddiard, Joey Walker, Lauren Hammel, Michael Cavanagh, Stu Mackenzie
Satanic Slumber Party Part 2 (Midnight in Sodom)	2022	Satanic Slumber Party	5:42	Ambrose Kenny-Smith, Cook Craig, Erica Dunn, Fiona Kitschin, Gareth Liddiard, Joey Walker, Lauren Hammel, Michael Cavanagh, Stu Mackenzie
Satanic Slumber Party Part 3 (Hoof and Horn)	2022	Satanic Slumber Party	12:14	Ambrose Kenny-Smith, Cook Craig, Erica Dunn, Fiona Kitschin, Gareth Liddiard, Joey Walker, Lauren Hammel, Michael Cavanagh, Stu Mackenzie
Sea of Doubt	2025	Phantom Island	4:25	Michael Cavanagh, Cook Craig, Lucas Harwood, Ambrose Kenny-Smith, Stu Mackenzie, Joey Walker
Sea of Trees	2012	12 Bar Bruise	3:15	Stu Mackenzie
Searching...	2017	Polygondwanaland	3:04	Stu Mackenzie
See Me	2021	L.W.	4:04	Stu Mackenzie
Self-Immolate	2019	Infest The Rat's Nest	4:28	Joey Walker, Michael Cavanagh, Stu Mackenzie
Sense	2015	Paper Mâché Dream Balloon	3:30	Stu Mackenzie
Set	2023	The Silver Cord	3:56	Ambrose Kenny-Smith, Cook Craig, Joey Walker, Michael Cavanagh, Lucas Harwood, Stu Mackenzie
Set (Extended Mix)	2023	The Silver Cord	10:18	Ambrose Kenny-Smith, Cook Craig, Joey Walker, Michael Cavanagh, Lucas Harwood, Stu Mackenzie
Shanghai	2021	Butterfly 3000	4:01	Ambrose Kenny-Smith, Stu Mackenzie
Short Change	2022	Changes	2:50	Stu Mackenzie
Silent Spirit	2025	Phantom Island	4:29	Michael Cavanagh, Cook Craig, Lucas Harwood, Ambrose Kenny-Smith, Stu Mackenzie, Joey Walker
Sketches of Brunswick East I	2017	Sketches of Brunswick East	1:20	Alex Brettin, Stu Mackenzie
Sketches of Brunswick East II	2017	Sketches of Brunswick East	3:26	Alex Brettin, Stu Mackenzie
Sketches of Brunswick East III	2017	Sketches of Brunswick East	2:08	Alex Brettin, Stu Mackenzie
Sleep	2010	Teenage Gizzard	3:36	Stu Mackenzie
Sleep Drifter	2017	Flying Microtonal Banana	4:44	Stu Mackenzie
Sleepwalker	2014	Oddments	3:46	Stu Mackenzie
Slow Jam 1	2014	I'm in Your Mind Fuzz	2:55	Stu Mackenzie
Smoke & Mirrors	2022	Made in Timeland	15:00	Ambrose Kenny-Smith, Joey Walker, Lucas Harwood, Michael Cavanagh, Stu Mackenzie
Some Context	2017	Murder of the Universe	0:16	Stu Mackenzie
Some Of Us	2020	K.G.	3:53	Cook Craig, Stu Mackenzie
Soy-Protein Munt Machine	2017	Murder of the Universe	0:30	Joey Walker, Stu Mackenzie
Space Junk	2023	The Silver Cord	4:35	Joey Walker, Michael Cavanagh, Lucas Harwood, Cook Craig, Stu Mackenzie, Ambrose Kenny-Smith
Spacesick	2025	Phantom Island	4:51	Michael Cavanagh, Cook Craig, Lucas Harwood, Ambrose Kenny-Smith, Stu Mackenzie, Joey Walker
Static Electricity	2021	L.W.	5:50	Ambrose Kenny-Smith, Stu Mackenzie
Stoned Mullet	2011	Willoughby's Beach	2:11	Stu Mackenzie
Straws In The Wind	2020	K.G.	5:42	Ambrose Kenny-Smith, Stu Mackenzie
Stressin'	2014	Oddments	2:56	Joey Walker, Stu Mackenzie
Summer!	2010	Teenage Gizzard	2:46	Stu Mackenzie
Superbug	2019	Infest The Rat's Nest	6:43	Stu Mackenzie
Supercell	2023	PetroDragonic Apocalypse; or, Dawn of Eternal Night: An Annihilation of Planet Earth and the Beginning of Merciless Damnation	5:06	Ambrose Kenny-Smith, Cook Craig, Joey Walker, Lucas Harwood, Michael Cavanagh, Stu Mackenzie
Superheavy, Supercritical	2026	Alien Metal	6:23	Stu Mackenzie, Ambrose Kenny-Smith, Joey Walker
Superposition	2017	Gumboot Soup	3:35	Joey Walker
Supreme Ascendancy	2021	L.W.	3:40	Ambrose Kenny-Smith, Stu Mackenzie
Swan Song	2023	The Silver Cord	4:26	Joey Walker, Michael Cavanagh, Lucas Harwood, Cook Craig, Stu Mackenzie, Ambrose Kenny-Smith
Swan Song (Extended Mix)	2023	The Silver Cord	10:30	Joey Walker, Michael Cavanagh, Lucas Harwood, Cook Craig, Stu Mackenzie, Ambrose Kenny-Smith
Tetrachromacy	2017	Polygondwanaland	3:31	Joey Walker, Michael Cavanagh, Stu Mackenzie
Tezeta	2017	Sketches of Brunswick East	3:30	Joey Walker
The Acrid Corpse	2017	Murder of the Universe	1:00	Stu Mackenzie
The Balrog	2017	Murder of the Universe	4:29	Stu Mackenzie
The Bird Song	2019	Fishing for Fishies	4:24	Ambrose Kenny-Smith, Stu Mackenzie
The Bitter Boogie	2015	Paper Mâché Dream Balloon	4:29	Ambrose Kenny-Smith, Stu Mackenzie
The Book	2017	Sketches of Brunswick East	5:00	Stu Mackenzie
The Castle in the Air	2017	Polygondwanaland	2:48	Joey Walker, Stu Mackenzie
The Cruel Millennial	2019	Fishing for Fishies	4:56	Ambrose Kenny-Smith, Stu Mackenzie
The Dripping Tap	2022	Omnium Gatherum	18:17	Ambrose Kenny-Smith, Stu Mackenzie
The Floating Fire	2017	Murder of the Universe	1:54	Stu Mackenzie
The Fourth Color	2017	Polygondwanaland	6:13	Stu Mackenzie
The Funeral	2022	Omnium Gatherum	2:23	Stu Mackenzie
The Garden Goblin	2022	Omnium Gatherum	2:56	Cook Craig, Stu Mackenzie
The God Man's Goat Lust	2013	Eyes Like The Sky	3:17	Broderick Smith, Stu Mackenzie
The Great Chain of Being	2017	Gumboot Soup	4:50	Stu Mackenzie
The Grim Reaper	2022	Omnium Gatherum	3:05	Ambrose Kenny-Smith, Heinz Funk, Joey Walker, Stu Mackenzie
The Hungry Wolf Of Fate	2020	K.G.	5:08	Stu Mackenzie
The Killing Ground	2013	Eyes Like The Sky	2:50	Broderick Smith, Stu Mackenzie
The Land Before Timeland	2022	Laminated Denim	15:00	Ambrose Kenny-Smith, Cook Craig, Joey Walker, Michael Cavanagh, Stu Mackenzie
The Last Oasis	2017	Gumboot Soup	3:34	Ambrose Kenny-Smith, Joey Walker, Stu Mackenzie
The Lord of Lightning	2017	Murder of the Universe	5:06	Stu Mackenzie
The Raid	2013	Eyes Like The Sky	2:24	Broderick Smith, Stu Mackenzie
The Reticent Raconteur	2017	Murder of the Universe	1:05	Stu Mackenzie
The River	2015	Quarters!	10:10	Stu Mackenzie
The Silver Cord	2023	The Silver Cord	4:20	Ambrose Kenny-Smith, Cook Craig, Joey Walker, Lucas Harwood, Michael Cavanagh, Stu Mackenzie
The Silver Cord (Extended Mix)	2023	The Silver Cord	12:45	Ambrose Kenny-Smith, Cook Craig, Joey Walker, Lucas Harwood, Michael Cavanagh, Stu Mackenzie
The Spider and Me	2017	Sketches of Brunswick East	3:16	Alex Brettin, Stu Mackenzie
The Wheel	2017	Gumboot Soup	5:37	Ambrose Kenny-Smith, Stu Mackenzie
The Wholly Ghost	2014	Cellophane 7'' Single	3:12	Stu Mackenzie
Theia	2023	The Silver Cord	3:24	Ambrose Kenny-Smith, Cook Craig, Joey Walker, Lucas Harwood, Michael Cavanagh, Stu Mackenzie
Theia (Extended Mix)	2023	The Silver Cord	20:41	Ambrose Kenny-Smith, Cook Craig, Joey Walker, Lucas Harwood, Michael Cavanagh, Stu Mackenzie
This Thing	2019	Fishing for Fishies	3:59	Joey Walker, Stu Mackenzie
Time=$$$	2015	Paper Mâché Dream Balloon	2:04	Stu Mackenzie
Time=Fate	2015	Paper Mâché Dream Balloon	2:26	Cook Craig
Timeland	2022	Made in Timeland	15:00	Cook Craig, Joey Walker, Michael Cavanagh, Stu Mackenzie
Tomb/Beach	2010	Anglesea EP	3:47	Stu Mackenzie
Trapdoor	2015	Paper Mâché Dream Balloon	2:38	Stu Mackenzie
Trench Foot	2011	Teenage Gizzard	1:55	Stu Mackenzie
Uh Oh, I Called Mum	2012	12 Bar Bruise	2:38	Stu Mackenzie
Uqt	2026	Alien Metal	4:16	Stu Mackenzie, Ambrose Kenny-Smith, Joey Walker
Vegemite	2014	Oddments	2:45	Stu Mackenzie
Venusian 1	2019	Infest The Rat's Nest	3:20	Stu Mackenzie
Venusian 2	2019	Infest The Rat's Nest	2:44	Joey Walker, Michael Cavanagh, Stu Mackenzie
Vomit Coffin	2017	Murder of the Universe	2:19	Stu Mackenzie
Wah Wah	2016	Nonagon Infinity	2:54	Stu Mackenzie
Welcome to an Altered Future	2017	Murder of the Universe	0:55	Stu Mackenzie
Willoughby's Beach	2011	Willoughby's Beach	2:53	Stu Mackenzie
Witchcraft	2023	PetroDragonic Apocalypse; or, Dawn of Eternal Night: An Annihilation of Planet Earth and the Beginning of Merciless Damnation	5:04	Cook Craig, Joey Walker, Michael Cavanagh, Stu Mackenzie
Work This Time	2014	Oddments	4:36	Joey Walker, Stu Mackenzie
Ya Love	2021	Butterfly 3000	4:16	Cook Craig, Stu Mackenzie
Year Of Our Lord	2013	Eyes Like The Sky	2:57	Broderick Smith, Stu Mackenzie
You Can Be Your Silhouette	2017	Sketches of Brunswick East	3:48	Stu Mackenzie
Yours	2021	Butterfly 3000	4:35	Stu Mackenzie

== Writers ==
Stu Mackenzie - 286 Songs

Joey Walker - 116 Songs

Ambrose Kenny-Smith - 94 Songs

Michael Cavanagh - 76 songs

Cook Craig - 73 songs

Lucas Harwood - 43 songs

Broderick Smith - 10 songs

Alex Brettin - 7 songs

Erica Dunn - 3 songs

Fiona Kitschin - 3 songs

Gareth Liddiard - 3 songs

Lauren Hammel - 3 songs

Amy Findlay - 1 song

Barney McAll - 1 song

Cal Shortal - 1 song

Daff Gravolin - 1 song

Eric Moore - 1 song

Hannah Findlay - 1 song

Heinz Funk - 1 song

Holly Findlay - 1 song

Jamie Harmer - 1 song

Sarah Findlay - 1 song

Zak Olsen - 1 song
