= Murder of the Universe =

Studio album by King Gizzard & the Lizard Wizard
- Released: 23 June 2017
- Recorded: Early 2017
- Studio: Flightless HQ
- Genres: Progressive rock; psychedelic rock; garage rock; progressive metal
- Length: 46:38
- Labels: Flightless; ATO; Heavenly
- Producer: Stu Mackenzie

King Gizzard & the Lizard Wizard chronology
Flying Microtonal Banana (2017)	Murder of the Universe (2017)	Sketches of Brunswick East (2017)

Singles from Murder of the Universe
- 1. "Han-Tyumi and the Murder of the Universe" Released: 11 April 2017; 2. "The Lord of Lightning vs Balrog" Released: 30 May 2017

Murder of the Universe is the tenth studio album by Australian psychedelic rock band King Gizzard & the Lizard Wizard. It was released on 23 June 2017 by Flightless in Australia, ATO Records in the United States, and Heavenly Recordings in the United Kingdom. It is the second of five albums released by the band in 2017.

The album was nominated for Best Hard Rock or Heavy Metal Album at the ARIA Music Awards of 2017, despite controversy over the band's win the previous year with Nonagon Infinity.

== Concept and storyline ==
Murder of the Universe is a concept album split into three separate stories, called suites, each containing elements of spoken word to carry a narrative. The first two suites feature Leah Senior's narration, while NaturalReader's "UK, Charles" text-to-speech application narrates the final suite.

The first suite, The Tale of the Altered Beast, explores themes of temptation and tells of a human who stumbles on a mystical human/beast hybrid creature dubbed the Altered Beast. The story starts with the pursuit of the human being, who slowly takes an interest in the idea of being altered – something considered taboo in the human's society. The perspective then changes to the Altered Beast itself, who is filled with murderous intentions. Confronted by the Beast, the human experiences a craving for power and slowly succumbs to the temptation of becoming altered. Accepting their mutual fate, the beast and human merge, creating a newly altered beast, who now craves even more flesh. However, the Altered Beast suffers greatly from absorbing another consciousness – it loses track of its identity and eventually dies of insanity, decaying into the earth.

I think it's the most narrative-driven thing we've done – it's three distinct, but somewhat interrelated stories.

— Stu Mackenzie

The second suite, The Lord of Lightning vs. Balrog, focuses on an epic battle between two entities dubbed The Lord of Lightning and Balrog, who represent the forces of light and darkness, respectively. The suite starts with a foreword from the perspective of a storyteller who recalls the battle. The action begins with the track "The Lord of Lightning", which is about the general destruction caused in a town by lightning fired from the entity's finger. He is perceived as evil and malevolent by the townsfolk. However, when he fires lightning at a corpse, it is somehow reanimated as a creature known as Balrog. This creature chooses to ignore the Lord of Lightning, and instead wreaks further havoc on the townspeople. The Lord chooses to fight the Balrog and defeats him, eventually leaving him as a burning corpse in "The Acrid Corpse". The Lord of Lightning then departs, choosing not to harm the townsfolk anymore.

The third and final suite, Han-Tyumi & The Murder of the Universe, is about a cyborg in a digital world who gains consciousness and, in confusion, decides to strive only for what a cyborg cannot do: vomit and die. He decides to create a creature dubbed the "Soy-Protein Munt Machine" whose only purpose is to vomit. When the creature rejects his love, Han-Tyumi decides to merge with the machine, which causes it to lose control. This machine explodes and infinitely expels vomit, which eventually engulfs the entire universe in a type of grey goo scenario: causing the titular "Murder of the Universe."

== Reception ==
Professional ratings
Aggregate scores
Source	Rating
Metacritic	73/100
Review scores
Source	Rating
AllMusic	3.5/5 stars
The A.V. Club	D+
Clash	8/10
Classic Rock	2.5/5 stars
Exclaim!	6/10
The Irish Times	3/5 stars
The Line of Best Fit	7.5/10
Paste	7.4/10
Pitchfork	8.0/10
Under the Radar	8.5/10

Murder of the Universe received positive reviews from music critics. On Metacritic, the album holds an average critic score of 73/100, based on 15 reviews, indicating "generally favorable reviews".

AllMusic's Tim Sendra wrote in his review for the album that "King Gizzard & the Lizard Wizard's second album of 2017 is a rampaging, feverish blast of sci-fi prog punctuated by whizzing synths and robotic voice-overs."

Exclaim!'s Cosette Schulz commented that "The 21-track album is certainly the strangest and most draining release that King Gizzard have made to date; not as ambitious as the seamlessly looping Nonagon Infinity, or this year's earlier release Flying Microtonal Banana, but a feat nonetheless."

DIY's Cady Siregar said the album was an "ambitious project" that succeeding in "enticing you into fully absorbing yourself into their wild, bizarre universe".

Writing about the album alongside King Gizzard as a broader cultural phenomenon, theorist Benjamin Kirbach argues that:

In Tolkien, the Balrog is a demon awakened inadvertently by the Dwarves of Moria. This ancient agent of retribution is no doubt Tolkien's metaphor for the hubris of modernity—and Gandalf must sacrifice himself so that Frodo et al. can escape its fiery contempt. In King Gizzard, the Balrog is similarly provoked by technological obtrusion ("You made the atom split / It caused a massive rift / And he came screaming through"). Like Godzilla, it wreaks havoc upon civilization—until the fabled Lord of Lightning appears. The beast is tamed, as it were, by the power of electricity.

Kirbach claims that the name Han-Tyumi itself is a "vaguely nipponized anagram of 'humanity'", and that the character represents

an A.I. born from the primordial ooze of global information networks that continue to function even after human beings themselves have died out ("BORN, IF YOU MAY CALL IT THAT / IN A WORLD THAT IS DENSE AND BLACK"). A prisoner of this solipsistic pedigree, with no point of reference but the archive of now-extinct human knowledge at his disposal, Han-Tyumi pines for his biological counterpart and becomes obsessed with two things that as a machine he cannot do: vomit and die. In an inversion of the Frankenstein myth, Han-Tyumi then constructs a humanoid body with whom he intends to fuse his consciousness (the computer even says, in no uncertain terms, "I DECLARED TO MY DESIGN / LIKE FRANKENSTEIN'S MONSTER / 'I AM YOUR FATHER, I AM YOUR GOD'"). This unholy merger triggers a chain-reaction in which the machine-human hybrid simultaneously ingests and regurgitates itself in infinite regress. As if throwing dialectical history into reverse, the bilious anti-singularity spills out and eventually coats the entire universe in vomit. . . . At the end of the album, the A.I.'s voice slows and tapers off in a digital swansong not unlike that of HAL 9000's.

In sum, Murder of the Universe 's psych-rock opera presents a mythopoetic allegory of human technogenesis: from the primal prosthesis of the altered beast to the illusory enframing of nature via electricity, and finally the zombified imprint of ourselves we leave behind as Han-Tyumi.

=== Accolades ===
Publication	Accolade	Year	Rank	Ref.
Rough Trade	Albums of the Year	2017	24	

== Track listing ==
All music composed by King Gizzard & the Lizard Wizard; all lyrics written by Stu Mackenzie; stories written by Mackenzie, except "Murder of the Universe" written by Joey Walker and Mackenzie.

Most vinyl releases have tracks 1–12 on Side A, and tracks 12–21 on Side B; "The Lord of Lightning" is split between the two sides. 2023 reissues include two records, with all suites occupying one side each and the fourth side being etched.

Suite 1: The Tale of the Altered Beast
No.	Title	Length
1.	"A New World"	0:57
2.	"Altered Beast I"	2:23
3.	"Alter Me I"	0:45
4.	"Altered Beast II"	4:28
5.	"Alter Me II"	1:25
6.	"Altered Beast III"	2:14
7.	"Alter Me III"	1:26
8.	"Altered Beast IV"	5:10
9.	"Life / Death"	1:00
Total length:		19:48

Suite 2: The Lord of Lightning vs. Balrog
No.	Title	Length
10.	"Some Context"	0:16
11.	"The Reticent Raconteur"	1:05
12.	"The Lord of Lightning"	5:06
13.	"The Balrog"	4:29
14.	"The Floating Fire"	1:54
15.	"The Acrid Corpse"	1:00
Total length:		13:50

Suite 3: Han-Tyumi and the Murder of the Universe
No.	Title	Length
16.	"Welcome to an Altered Future"	0:55
17.	"Digital Black"	2:46
18.	"Han-Tyumi, the Confused Cyborg"	2:21
19.	"Soy-Protein Munt Machine"	0:30
20.	"Vomit Coffin"	2:19
21.	"Murder of the Universe"	4:09
Total length:		13:00

== Personnel ==
Credits for Murder of the Universe adapted from liner notes.

King Gizzard & the Lizard Wizard

- Stu Mackenzie – vocals, Hagström F12 guitar, Roland Juno-60 synthesizer, Yamaha DX-7 synthesizer, Mellotron flute, Mellotron choir, Yamaha Reface YC organ, Fender Mustang bass, Natural Reader UK Charles
- Michael Cavanagh – '62 Maxwin drum kit, '61 Yamaha Tiger Red Swirl kit
- Joey Walker – Yamaha SG-3 guitar, Yamaha Reface YC organ, Roland JX-3P synthesizer, Roland Juno-60 synthesizer
- Ambrose Kenny-Smith – Hohner Special 20 harmonica, Yamaha Reface YC organ
- Cook Craig – Rickenbacker 620 guitar
- Lucas Skinner – Fender Mustang bass
- Eric Moore – management

Additional musicians

- Leah Senior – spoken word (tracks 1–9, 11–15)

Production

- Casey Hartnett – recording
- Stu Mackenzie – recording, production
- Michael Badger – recording, mixing
- Joey Walker – recording
- Joe Carra – mastering
- Jason Galea – artwork

== Charts ==
Chart (2017)	Peak position
Australian Albums (ARIA)	3
Belgian Albums (Ultratop Flanders)	139
Belgian Albums (Ultratop Wallonia)	115
New Zealand Heatseekers Albums (RMNZ)	9
Scottish Albums (Official Charts)	58
UK Albums (Official Charts)	94
US Billboard 200	106
US Independent Albums (Billboard)	6
US Top Alternative Albums (Billboard)	15
US Top Rock Albums (Billboard)	20
