= Quarters! =

Studio album by King Gizzard & the Lizard Wizard
- Released: 1 May 2015
- Recorded: 29 May 2014 (track 2); 3 November 2014 (tracks 1, 3–4); 2 December 2014 (add.)
- Studio: Ski lodge at Hunter Mountain, New York (track 2); Daptone, New York (tracks 1, 3–4); Apartment in London (add.)
- Genre: Psychedelic pop; psychedelic rock; jazz-rock; progressive rock
- Length: 40:40
- Label: Heavenly; Flightless; Castle Face

King Gizzard & the Lizard Wizard chronology
I'm in Your Mind Fuzz (2014)	Quarters! (2015)	Paper Mâché Dream Balloon (2015)

Singles from Quarters!
- 1. "The River" Released: 8 April 2015

Quarters! is the sixth studio album by Australian psychedelic rock band King Gizzard & the Lizard Wizard. It was released on 1 May 2015 on Heavenly Recordings in Europe, Flightless Records in Australia, and Castle Face Records in the United States. The album peaked at No. 99 on the ARIA Charts.

The album was nominated for Best Jazz Album at the ARIA Music Awards of 2015, losing to Barney McAll for Mooroolbark.

== Background ==
The album features four songs, each running for exactly ten minutes and ten seconds making each song a quarter of the album - hence the title. Drawing upon jazz-fusion and psychedelic rock, the album's more laid-back sound was described as "unlike anything they’ve released before" and as "an album more likely to get your head bobbing and hips shaking as opposed to losing footwear in a violent mosh".

Stu Mackenzie described how the composition of the album came around in an interview in 2015:

"I wanted to make a record where I didn’t have to yell, as well as exploring some longer, repetitive song structures.” Four tracks, four quarters, each one precisely 10:10 minutes long, each one an extended jam teeming with melodies, the occasional trickle of water, space funk, laughter like Pink Floyd and deliciously unfussy grooves. I also didn’t want to use any brutal guitar pedals or sing through blown-out guitar amps as I usually would."

== Reception ==
Professional ratings
Aggregate scores
Source	Rating
Metacritic	68/100
Review scores
Source	Rating
AllMusic	4/5 stars
The Guardian	4/5 stars
The Line of Best Fit	6.5/10
The Music	3.5/4 stars

Upon its release, Quarters! received generally positive reviews by music critics. At Metacritic, which assigns a normalized rating out of 100 to reviews from critics, the album received an average score of 68, based on 8 reviews, indicating "generally favorable".

Writing for The Guardian, Everett True claimed during the album that "King Gizzard & the Lizard Wizard unravel mysteries, perform magic, tease melodies out of intricately formed musical patterns and do it all with a face that would be straight except it’s taken too many mind-altering substances."

== Music ==
The album consists of four psychedelic pop songs, all running exactly ten minutes and ten seconds. "The River" is a Traffic-style jazz-rock song with Santana-esque congas. It is the second song by the band to feature an odd time signature, with the majority of the song in 5/4.

Tim Sendra of AllMusic described the album as a "jazz-prog epic." Mike Katzif of NPR described the album's music as "jazz-inflected prog rock."

== Track listing ==
Vinyl releases have tracks 1–2 on Side A, and tracks 3–4 on Side B.

All tracks are written by Stu Mackenzie.

Quarters! track listing
No.	Title	Length
1.	"The River"	10:10
2.	"Infinite Rise"	10:10
3.	"God Is in the Rhythm"	10:10
4.	"Lonely Steel Sheet Flyer"	10:10
Total length:		40:40

== Personnel ==
Credits for Quarters! adapted from liner notes.

King Gizzard & the Lizard Wizard

- Michael Cavanagh – drums, conga
- Cook Craig – guitar
- Ambrose Kenny-Smith – harmonica, vocals
- Stu Mackenzie – vocals, guitar
- Eric Moore – drums, percussion
- Lucas Skinner – bass
- Joey Walker – guitar, bass

Production

- Stu Mackenzie – recording (track 2), additional recording, mixing
- Wayne Gordon – recording (tracks 1, 3, 4)
- Joe Carra – mastering
- Jason Galea – cover, layout, photo

== Charts ==
Chart performance for Quarters!
Chart (2015)	Peak position
Australian Albums (ARIA)	99
