= Oddments =

Studio album by King Gizzard & the Lizard Wizard
- Released: 7 March 2014
- Genre: Psychedelic rock; psychedelic pop; folk rock
- Length: 32:07
- Label: Flightless
- Producer: Stu Mackenzie; Joe Walker

King Gizzard & the Lizard Wizard chronology
Float Along – Fill Your Lungs (2013)	Oddments (2014)	I'm in Your Mind Fuzz (2014)

Singles from Oddments
- 1. "Vegemite" Released: 13 January 2014

Oddments is the fourth studio album by Australian psychedelic rock band King Gizzard & the Lizard Wizard. It was released on 7 March 2014 on Flightless. It peaked at No. 13 on the ARIA Albums Chart after being re-released on vinyl in November 2018. "Work This Time" was their most-streamed song on Spotify before the band withdrew their discography from the platform in July of 2025, with over 51 million streams.

== Background and recording ==
Oddments was announced on 14 January 2014, with "Vegemite" serving as the album's lead single. Lead vocalist Stu Mackenzie said that the song was "probably the most literal song [he's] ever written". Oddments consists of outtakes from the band's prior releases, with the album serving as a way to compile the songs without necessarily adhering to a sound or theme as the band had done up until that point; the oddment nature of the songs (being leftovers from previous albums) gave the album its name. The album opener "Alluda Majaka" refers to and features an audio sample of the 1995 Telugu film of the same name. During production of the album, Mackenzie's laptop was stolen with the masters for several tracks on the album alongside a majority of the tracks from The Murlocs' debut album Loopholes, forcing both bands to rerecord the lost material.

== Reception ==
Professional ratings
Review scores
Source	Rating
AllMusic	3.5/5 stars
Rolling Stone Australia	3.5/5 stars

Oddments was King Gizzard's fourth album in 18 months, with some reviewers noting that the album's quality seemingly suffered from the rush to quickly turnaround new material. Reviewers and retrospectives on the band's discography also noted that the album was overall stylistically fractured and incohesive, something other releases of theirs had not been prior nor since, although some reviewers and retrospectives also pointed out that songs had a pop lean to them.

== Track listing ==
Vinyl releases have tracks 1–6 on Side A, and tracks 7–12 on Side B.

Oddments track listing
No.	Title	Writer(s)	Producer(s)	Length
1.	"Alluda Majaka"	Stu Mackenzie		3:34
2.	"Stressin'"	Joey Walker; Mackenzie	Walker; Mackenzie	2:56
3.	"Vegemite"	Mackenzie		2:45
4.	"It's Got Old"	Mackenzie		2:58
5.	"Work This Time"	Walker; Mackenzie	Walker; Mackenzie	4:36
6.	"ABABCD"	Walker	Walker	0:17
7.	"Sleepwalker"	Mackenzie		3:46
8.	"Hot Wax"	Mackenzie; Ambrose Kenny-Smith		3:29
9.	"Crying"	Cook Craig		2:56
10.	"Pipe-Dream"	Craig		1:01
11.	"Homeless Man in Adidas"	Mackenzie		3:24
12.	"Oddments"	Mackenzie		0:25
Total length:				32:07

== Personnel ==
Credits for Oddments adapted from liner notes.

King Gizzard & the Lizard Wizard

- Michael Cavanagh
- Cook Craig
- Ambrose Kenny-Smith
- Stu Mackenzie
- Eric Moore
- Lucas Skinner
- Joe Walker

Additional musicians

- Monty Hartnett – drums (tracks 9 and 10)

Production

- Stu Mackenzie – production (tracks 1–5 and 7–12)
- Joe Walker – production (tracks 2, 5 and 6)
- Joe Carra – mastering
- Jason Galea – cover art and layout
- Jarrad Brown – recording assistance (track 7)

== Charts ==
Chart performance for Oddments
Chart (2018)	Peak position
Australian Albums (ARIA)	13
