= Nonagon Infinity =

Studio album by King Gizzard & the Lizard Wizard
- Released: 29 April 2016
- Studio: Daptone Studios in Brooklyn, New York
- Genres: Progressive rock; psychedelic rock; garage rock; jazz fusion; heavy metal
- Length: 41:45
- Labels: Flightless; ATO; Heavenly

King Gizzard & the Lizard Wizard chronology
Paper Mâché Dream Balloon (2015)	Nonagon Infinity (2016)	Flying Microtonal Banana (2017)

Singles from Nonagon Infinity
- 1. "Gamma Knife" Released: 9 March 2016; 2. "People-Vultures" Released: 4 April 2016; 3. "Mr. Beat" Released: 11 April 2016

Nonagon Infinity is the eighth studio album by Australian psychedelic rock band King Gizzard & the Lizard Wizard. It was released on 29 April 2016 on Flightless Records in Australia, ATO Records in the United States, and Heavenly Recordings in Europe. The album is designed to play as an "infinite loop" where each song segues into the next and the last song segues into the first, so that "the record can be played front-to-back-to-front-to-back and the sound won't break". The title is a reference to this idea, as there are nine songs on the album that could be played "infinitely".

Considered the band's breakthrough album, Nonagon Infinity earned positive reviews from critics and gave King Gizzard greater international exposure, while becoming their first release to make the top 20 of the Australian albums chart. The album controversially won Best Hard Rock/Heavy Metal album at the ARIA Music Awards of 2016, with some accusing the ARIA of miscategorizing Nonagon Infinity. The album won Best Album at the Music Victoria Awards of 2016.

The band has referenced or expanded upon various aspects of the album on subsequent projects. The opening track, "Robot Stop", briefly features use of microtonal tuning, a technique explored further on the band's follow-up, Flying Microtonal Banana, while themes from Nonagon Infinity were revisited in "The Lord of Lightning vs. Balrog" suite from their 2017 album, Murder of the Universe.

== Reception ==
Professional ratings
Aggregate scores
Source	Rating
AnyDecentMusic?	7.8/10
Metacritic	83/100
Review scores
Source	Rating
AllMusic	5/5 stars
Drowned in Sound	9/10
Exclaim!	8/10
The Guardian	4/5 stars
Mojo	4/5 stars
NME	4/5
Pitchfork	8.0/10
Q	4/5 stars
Record Collector	4/5 stars
Uncut	8/10

Upon its release, Nonagon Infinity received acclaim from music critics. At Metacritic, which assigns a normalised rating out of 100 to reviews from critics, the album received an average score of 83, based on 14 reviews, indicating "universal acclaim".

Writing for AllMusic, Tim Sendra claimed that the band's inventive sound made Nonagon Infinity "not only their best album yet, but maybe the best psych-metal-jazz-prog album ever". He also called the album an "amazing prog-psych epic".

Director Edgar Wright has since cited the album as one of his favorite albums of all time, stating that "you could be forgiven for thinking you were hearing one long extended track, but my God does it rock."

Matthew Coakley of The Triangle said the album was musically a gritty, heavy, lo-fi garage rock aesthetic and created a 'never-ending loop' of an album where all the songs flow directly into one another.

Jamie McNamara of BeatRoute magazine called it "a rollicking, garage-rock epic".

In 2019, Nonagon Infinity ranked 2nd on Happy Mag's list of "The 25 best psychedelic rock albums of the 2010s".

== Track listing ==
All tracks are written by Stu Mackenzie.

Nonagon Infinity track listing
No.	Title	Length
1.	"Robot Stop"	5:22
2.	"Big Fig Wasp"	4:54
3.	"Gamma Knife"	4:21
4.	"People-Vultures"	4:45
5.	"Mr. Beat"	4:56
6.	"Evil Death Roll"	7:14
7.	"Invisible Face"	3:01
8.	"Wah Wah"	2:54
9.	"Road Train"	4:18
Total length:		41:45

== Personnel ==
Credits for Nonagon Infinity adapted from liner notes.

King Gizzard & the Lizard Wizard

- Stu Mackenzie – vocals, electric guitar, synthesizer, organ, zurna
- Joey Walker – electric guitar, setar, synthesizer
- Cook Craig – electric guitar, synthesizer
- Ambrose Kenny-Smith – harmonica, organ
- Lucas Skinner – bass guitar
- Michael Cavanagh – drum kit, conga
- Eric Moore – drum kit

Production

- Wayne Gordon – recording
- Paul Maybury – recording (tracks 2, 4, 7)
- Michael Badger – vocal recording, mixing
- Stu Mackenzie – additional vocal recording, additional mixing
- Joe Carra – mastering
- Jason Galea – artwork
- Danny Cohen – photography

== Charts ==
Chart performance for Nonagon Infinity
Chart (2016)	Peak position
Australian Albums (ARIA)	19
Belgian Albums (Ultratop Flanders)	152
Belgian Albums (Ultratop Wallonia)	92
UK Independent Albums (Official Charts Company)	13
UK Independent Albums Breakers (Official Charts Company)	4
UK Physical Albums (Official Charts Company)	69
UK Vinyl Albums (Official Charts Company)	14
US Independent Albums (Billboard)	16
US Top Album Sales (Billboard)	96
US Top Alternative Albums (Billboard)	14
US Top Heatseekers Albums (Billboard)	4
US Top Rock Albums (Billboard)	23
US Top Tastemaker Albums (Billboard)	15
