= Paper Mâché Dream Balloon =

Studio album by King Gizzard & the Lizard Wizard
- Released: 13 November 2015
- Recorded: Early 2015 (tracks 1–11); June 2015 (track 12)
- Studio: Various homes, sheds, garages, apartments, hotels, tunnels (tracks 1–11); The End, Brooklyn, New York (track 12)
- Genre: Folk rock; psychedelic folk; psychedelic pop; dream pop
- Length: 33:46
- Label: Heavenly; ATO; Flightless

King Gizzard & the Lizard Wizard chronology
Quarters! (2015)	Paper Mâché Dream Balloon (2015)	Nonagon Infinity (2016)

Singles from Paper Mâché Dream Balloon
- 1. "Paper Mâché Dream Balloon" Released: 17 August 2015; 2. "Trapdoor" Released: 21 September 2015

Professional ratings
Aggregate scores
Source	Rating
Metacritic	71/100
Review scores
Source	Rating
AllMusic	3.5/5 stars
Clash	7/10
DIY	4/5 stars
Exclaim!	8/10
The Guardian	4/5 stars
musicOMH	4/5 stars
Under the Radar	7.5/10 stars

Paper Mâché Dream Balloon is the seventh studio album by Australian psychedelic rock band King Gizzard & the Lizard Wizard. It was released on 13 November 2015 on Flightless Records in Australia, ATO Records in the United States, and Heavenly Recordings in Europe. The album was recorded with almost entirely acoustic instruments.

== Track listing ==
All tracks are written by Stu Mackenzie, except where noted.

No.	Title	Writer(s)	Length
1.	"Sense"		3:30
2.	"Bone"		2:16
3.	"Dirt"	Joey Walker	2:50
4.	"Paper Mâché Dream Balloon"		2:39
5.	"Trapdoor"		2:38
6.	"Cold Cadaver"		2:43
7.	"The Bitter Boogie"	Mackenzie; Ambrose Kenny-Smith	4:29
8.	"N.G.R.I. (Bloodstain)"		2:25
9.	"Time = Fate"	Cook Craig	2:26
10.	"Time = $$$"		2:04
11.	"Most of What I Like"	Walker	3:17
12.	"Paper Mâché"	Craig; Mackenzie; Walker	2:29
Total length:			33:46

== Personnel ==
Credits adapted from liner notes.

King Gizzard & the Lizard Wizard

- Stu Mackenzie – acoustic guitar, drums, piano, vocals, flute, clarinet, double bass, bass guitar, violin, percussion, sitar
- Lucas Skinner – piano, bass guitar
- Joey Walker – acoustic guitar, vocals, bass guitar, double bass
- Cook Craig – acoustic guitar, vocals (track 9), double bass, percussion
- Ambrose Kenny-Smith – vocals, harmonica
- Michael Cavanagh – drums, bongo, conga
- Eric Moore – nothing

Production

- Stu Mackenzie – recording (tracks 1–11)
- Lucas Skinner – recording (tracks 1–11)
- Joey Walker – recording (tracks 1–11)
- Jacob Portrait – recording (track 12)
- Mikey Young – mixing
- Joe Carra – mastering
- Jason Galea – artwork, photography

== Charts ==
Chart performance for Paper Mâché Dream Balloon
Chart (2015)	Peak position
Australian Albums (ARIA)	37
UK Independent Albums (OCC)	37
US Top Album Sales (Billboard)	71
US Heatseekers Albums (Billboard)	10
