= Float Along – Fill Your Lungs =

Studio album by King Gizzard & the Lizard Wizard
- Released: 27 September 2013
- Genres: Psychedelic rock; garage rock; raga rock
- Length: 41:53
- Label: Flightless
- Producers: Stu Mackenzie; Paul Maybury; Jarrad Brown

King Gizzard & the Lizard Wizard chronology
Eyes Like the Sky (2013)	Float Along – Fill Your Lungs (2013)	Oddments (2014)

Singles from Float Along – Fill Your Lungs
- 1. "Head On/Pill" Released: 18 June 2013; 2. "30 Past 7" Released: 30 July 2013

Float Along – Fill Your Lungs is the third studio album by Australian psychedelic rock band King Gizzard & the Lizard Wizard. It was released on 27 September 2013 on Flightless Records and was re-released on vinyl in November 2018 by Flightless and ATO Records, with the re-release peaking at No. 12 on the ARIA Albums Chart. The album was a change in style for the band, with the album having more influence from psychedelic music compared to their previous releases, a theme that would carry onto future albums.

== Background and recording ==
Float Along – Fill Your Lungs was released in September 2013, seven months after their previous album, Eyes Like the Sky. It is the band's third album and fifth recorded release, and the first to feature second drummer, Eric Moore, using a drum kit as opposed to theremin and keyboards as used previously. The album was recorded in home studios and sheds in Darraweit Guim, Deniliquin, and Anglesea, where they experimented with a psychedelic sound as opposed to the Western sound on their previous album. The band furthered their experimentation by using synthesizers and the sitar, while also using unique time signatures in their music for the first time. It was produced by Paul Maybury, Jarrad Brown, and band member Stu Mackenzie.

Before the album's release a live video for "Head On/Pill" was issued, and the band played the full album live.

== Singles ==
Two singles were released in support of the album. The first of these was "Head On/Pill", which was released as a music video on YouTube on 2 July 2013. It was followed by "30 Past 7", which was released on 31 July 2013. "Head On/Pill" was first shown when it was performed live in early 2013, prior to the album's release. Both singles feature prominent sitar.

"Head On/Pill" was received positively by critics, with John Paul of PopMatters calling the song a "sixteen-minute epic" and Patrick Emery of The Sydney Morning Herald calling it an "epic opening", with the song receiving further praise for its ability to keep the listener engaged despite its length.

"30 Past 7" was also received well and was described as slow and ethereal by some. The use of the sitar in the song was viewed positively by critics, who said that it fit into the song and fulfilled a purpose.

== Music videos ==
There were two music videos released for the singles, "30 Past 7" and "Head On/Pill", from Float Along – Fill Your Lungs.

The music video for "Head On/Pill" was created by friend of the band, Syd Row, and shows the band performing the song live in their studio.

The video for "30 Past 7" was created by long-time King Gizzard & the Lizard Wizard collaborator Jason Galea, who created the video using old VHS footage and white noise. The video was made to represent the feeling of waking up early in the morning for work, and features scenes designed to represent a worker fighting their boss and going insane from their job.

== Music ==
On Float Along – Fill Your Lungs, King Gizzard & the Lizard Wizard experimented with a more psychedelic sound. As well as psychedelic, the music on the album has been described as garage and fuzz. The album has also been described as experimental, drawing influences from the music of the 1960s as well as featuring instruments such as the sitar in its music. The title track also marks the band's first use of odd time signatures, with the entire song being composed in 5/4. Indre McGlinn of The Music Network called the musical style of Float Along – Fill Your Lungs "maturing" when compared with the band's previous work, with the stylistic choices made by the band differing from those found on their previous albums.

== Reception ==
Professional ratings
Review scores
Source	Rating
AllMusic	3.5/5 stars
PopMatters	7/10 stars
The Sydney Morning Herald	5/5 stars

Reception of the album was generally positive, with many authors praising the experimentation found within the album. In a review from AllMusic, Tim Sendra describes Float Along – Fill Your Lungs as "cool and definitely worth getting into" with the album receiving 3 and a half out of 5 stars. Patrick Emery from The Sydney Morning Herald described the album as a "fantastic and truly mesmerising record". The re-release of Float Along – Fill Your Lungs peaked at number 12 on the ARIA Albums Chart in 2018.

== Track listing ==
Vinyl releases have tracks 1–3 on Side A, and tracks 4–8 on Side B.

All tracks are written by Stu Mackenzie, except where noted.

Float Along – Fill Your Lungs track listing
No.	Title	Writer(s)	Length
1.	"Head On/Pill"		15:59
2.	"I'm Not a Man Unless I Have a Woman"		2:54
3.	"God Is Calling Me Back Home"		4:24
4.	"30 Past 7"		3:43
5.	"Let Me Mend the Past"	Stu Mackenzie; Ambrose Kenny-Smith	2:30
6.	"Mystery Jack"		2:48
7.	"Pop in My Step"	Cook Craig	2:50
8.	"Float Along – Fill Your Lungs"		6:45
Total length:			41:53

== Personnel ==
Credits for Float Along – Fill Your Lungs adapted from liner notes.

King Gizzard & the Lizard Wizard

- Michael Cavanagh
- Cook Craig
- Ambrose Kenny-Smith
- Stu Mackenzie
- Eric Moore
- Lucas Skinner
- Joe Walker

Production

- Stu Mackenzie – production, recording
- Paul Maybury – co-production, recording, mixing
- Jarrad Brown – co-production, recording, mixing (track 6)
- Michael Badger – mixing (track 1)
- Joe Carra – mastering
- Ben Butcher – front cover photo
- Jason Galea – projections, art, layout, back cover photo

== Charts ==
Chart performance for Float Along – Fill Your Lungs
Chart (2018)	Peak position
Australian Albums (ARIA)	12
