= Flight b741 =

Studio album by King Gizzard & the Lizard Wizard
- Released: 9 August 2024
- Genre: Blues rock
- Length: 43:06
- Label: p(doom)
- Producer: Stu Mackenzie

King Gizzard & the Lizard Wizard chronology
The Silver Cord (2023)	Flight b741 (2024)	Phantom Island (2025)

Singles from Flight b741
- 1. "Le Risque" Released: 9 July 2024; 2. "Hog Calling Contest" Released: 23 July 2024; 3. "Field of Vision" Released: 6 August 2024; 4. "Raw Feel / Flight b741" Released: 14 September 2024; 5. "Antarctica / Sad Pilot" Released: 15 November 2024

Professional ratings
Aggregate scores
Source	Rating
AnyDecentMusic?	7.2/10
Metacritic	76/100
Review scores
Source	Rating
AllMusic	2.5/5 stars
DIY	4/5 stars
Far Out	3/5 stars
The Guardian	4/5 stars
Record Collector	4/5 stars
Under the Radar	8.5/10

Flight b741 is the twenty-sixth studio album by Australian psychedelic rock band King Gizzard & the Lizard Wizard, released on 9 August 2024. The album was announced on 1 July and was made available for pre-order eight days later. This album marks a return to the band's blues rock and boogie sound. Flight b741 is the first King Gizzard & the Lizard Wizard record to be released on their new label, p(doom) Records.

At the 2024 ARIA Music Awards, the album was nominated for Best Rock Album.

== Background ==
On 27 October 2023, when the band released their 25th studio album, The Silver Cord, they posted a thank you post via Instagram while teasing another record. On 6 May 2024, the band announced their new label, p(doom) Records, which they named after the concept of P(doom) in artificial intelligence. During the European leg of the band's World Tour 2024, multiple songs from Flight b741 would be debuted a month before the album's announcement.

The album was based on jam sessions and sees the band incorporating a blues rock style reminiscent of their sound on 2019's Fishing for Fishies. Lead vocalist Stu Mackenzie said about the record: "We're having a lot of fun, but we're often singing about some pretty heavy shit," Mackenzie adds, "and probably hitting on some deeper, more universal themes than usual. It's not a sci-fi record, it's about life and stuff. But the record is like a really fun weekend with your mates, you know? Like, proper fun."

Mackenzie also stated:

This is our most collaborative record – the collaboration was occurring in the room, it was free, and everyone was bringing in songs and ideas. And we wanted to have as many lead vocalists as we could, and to pass the mic, like, 'This is my part, my idea, I'm gonna sing it and then I'm gonna pass the mic along to you and you can do your thing'. The whole record is built around that.

On October 29, 2024, the band made a surprise announcement of a new single, "Phantom Island". In the announcement, the band noted that the Flight b741 recording sessions had actually resulted in the creation of twenty songs, with only the first ten included on Flight b741 itself. The remaining ten were recorded with a full orchestra and announced to be their own album.

== Album cover ==
The album cover for Flight b741 was designed by Jason Galea and features a wooden airplane piloted by eight pigs. According to an Instagram post by Galea, the airplane is a model, and the pigs were meticulously crafted from clay.

== Track listing ==
Vinyl releases have tracks 1–5 on side A, and tracks 6–10 on side B.

All tracks are written by Michael Cavanagh, Cook Craig, Lucas Harwood, Ambrose Kenny-Smith, Stu Mackenzie, and Joey Walker, except where noted.

Flight b741 track listing
No.	Title	Writer(s)	Lead vocalists	Length
1.	"Mirage City"		Mackenzie; Kenny-Smith; Walker	4:48
2.	"Antarctica"		Kenny-Smith; Craig; Mackenzie; Harwood	4:32
3.	"Raw Feel"		Walker; Kenny-Smith; Harwood; Craig; Mackenzie	4:17
4.	"Field of Vision"		Kenny-Smith; Mackenzie; Walker	3:35
5.	"Hog Calling Contest"		Mackenzie; Kenny-Smith; Craig	3:21
6.	"Le Risque"	Cavanagh; Craig; Kenny-Smith; Mackenzie; Walker	Walker; Cavanagh; Kenny-Smith; Mackenzie	3:34
7.	"Flight b741"		Harwood; Craig; Mackenzie; Walker	3:58
8.	"Sad Pilot"	Cavanagh; Craig; Kenny-Smith; Mackenzie; Walker	Walker; Kenny-Smith; Mackenzie	4:12
9.	"Rats in the Sky"		Kenny-Smith; Craig; Mackenzie; Walker	3:07
10.	"Daily Blues"		Mackenzie; Kenny-Smith; Harwood	7:42
Total length:				43:06

== Personnel ==
King Gizzard & the Lizard Wizard

- Stu Mackenzie – vocals, guitar (all tracks), bass guitar (tracks 3, 4, 6, 8–10), Mellotron (tracks 3, 9), organ (track 3)
- Ambrose Kenny-Smith – vocals (all tracks), harmonica (tracks 1–7, 10), saxophone (tracks 1, 3, 6, 9), piano (tracks 1, 2, 8–10), Mellotron (track 7)
- Joey Walker – vocals (all tracks), guitar (tracks 1–4, 6, 8–10), bass guitar (tracks 5, 7)
- Michael Cavanagh – vocals, drums, percussion (all tracks)
- Cook Craig – vocals (all tracks), organ (tracks 3–8, 10), Mellotron (tracks 1, 7, 9), bass guitar (track 2)
- Lucas Harwood – vocals (all tracks), bass guitar (tracks 1, 3, 4, 9, 10), piano (tracks 3, 5, 7, 10), organ (track 2), electric piano (track 10)

Additional musicians

- Sam Joseph – pedal steel guitar (tracks 1, 5, 7, 10); full band recording

Technical

- Stu Mackenzie – production, engineer, mixing
- Joe Carra – mastering

Artwork

- Jason Galea – artwork, layout, photography
- Maclay Heriot – photography

== Charts ==
Chart performance for Flight b741
Chart (2024)	Peak position
Australian Albums (ARIA)	8
Scottish Albums (Official Charts)	66
UK Album Downloads (Official Charts)	8
UK Albums Sales (OCC)	25
US Billboard 200	118
US Independent Albums (Billboard)	21
