= The Silver Cord (King Gizzard & the Lizard Wizard album) =

Studio album by King Gizzard & the Lizard Wizard
- Released: 27 October 2023
- Genre: Electropop; progressive electronic
- Length: 28:14 (standard digital); 40:05 (standard vinyl); 88:44 (extended edition)
- Label: KGLW
- Producer: Stu Mackenzie

King Gizzard & the Lizard Wizard chronology
Live in Chicago '23 (2023)	The Silver Cord (2023)	Flight b741 (2024)

Singles from The Silver Cord
- 1. "Theia" / "The Silver Cord" / "Set" Released: 3 Oct 2023; 2. "Swan Song" / "Extinction" Released: 22 May 2024; 3. "Set" / "Gilgamesh" Released: 14 September 2024

The Silver Cord is the twenty-fifth studio album by Australian psychedelic rock band King Gizzard & the Lizard Wizard, released on 27 October 2023 on KGLW. Produced by group member Stu Mackenzie, the project is made up of two distinct albums with extended or shortened versions of the same tracks: one lasting 28 minutes, the other 88 minutes.

Inspired by drummer Michael Cavanagh's purchase of a Simmons electronic drum kit, the band eschewed their guitar-based rock sound for this release, instead focusing on synthesizer-based music.

== Background and recording ==
"I love Donna Summer's records with Giorgio Moroder, and I'd never listen to the short versions now—I'm one of those people who wants to hear the whole thing. We're testing the boundaries of people's attention spans when it comes to listening to music, perhaps—but I'm heavily interested in destroying such concepts."

— Stu Mackenzie on the extended versions of songs on The Silver Cord

On 7 May 2023, the band announced their 24th studio album, PetroDragonic Apocalypse; or, Dawn of Eternal Night: An Annihilation of Planet Earth and the Beginning of Merciless Damnation via Instagram. According to bassist Lucas Harwood, that album would be one of two upcoming albums that would have a "Yin and Yang" concept, stating that they are "going to be very different sounding to each other, but we're going to try to make them complement each other". The seven tracks on the extended versions of this album correspond to tracks on PetroDragonic. This recording was made with synthesizers and analogue recording equipment.

Prior to the album's release, band member Joey Walker described The Silver Cord as "definitely synth-y", with Spin writer Jonathan Cohen drawing comparisons to the band's electronica-influenced Butterfly 3000: "You could draw comparisons in many ways, but just in the nature of us being in the same room and playing and writing together, it's vastly different than Butterfly." The band later noted that they had struggled in adapting Butterfly 3000's studio-based sound to a live setting. According to Mackenzie: "It was a disaster. Totally demoralising. We gave up and started working on the next thing, but it felt like we had done [Butterfly 3000] a bit of a disservice. We were just waiting to do another electronic record that we could make in a room together, waiting for the right moment."

The album's genesis came from drummer Michael Cavanagh impulse buying a Simmons electronic drum kit. Stu Mackenzie recalled: "As soon as he plugged it in… I thought, ‘That’s the sound of the album right there, it’s so amazing and distinctive. We have to commit to this’."

== Release ==
On 27 September, the album was officially announced via their Instagram account, set to be released on 27 October, with preorders happening on 12 October. For the 1LP version the preorders came in "Capybara Baby", "Crystal Ball", "Flying Spirit" and "Quantum Foam" editions, while the 2LP versions came in "Ancient Light", "Shadow on the Moon", "Scorching Sands" and "Rain of Sorrow" editions, all on their US, AU and EU stores, respectively. On 3 October, the first three tracks from the album were released as one single, with an accompanying music video: the standard length versions of "Theia", "The Silver Cord" and "Set".

== Reception ==
Professional ratings
Aggregate scores
Source	Rating
Metacritic	70/100
Review scores
Source	Rating
AllMusic	2.5/5 stars
Clash	8/10
DIY	4/5 stars
Exclaim!	7/10
Pitchfork	7.1/10

According to the review aggregator Metacritic, The Silver Cord received "generally favorable reviews" based on a weighted average score of 70 out of 100 from nine critic scores. Editors at AllMusic rated this album 2.5 out of 5 stars, with critic Tim Sendra writing that "Occasionally this sonic exploration yields golden nuggets of sparkling electronic treasure, but most often the finds aren't quite as valuable. Far too often, the band's reach outstrips their ability to make something interesting happen." BrooklynVegan's Bill Pearis chose a three-way tie for Album of the Week, including The Silver Cord, which he stated shows that the band are "as good at bangers as they are rippers" and noting "while I do prefer some of the extended versions of songs, the shorter version of the album plays more like a DJ mix with better flow, while the long one has spacier transitions". Jazz Hodge of Clash scored this release an 8 out of 10, stating that this is "arguably ... their weirdest album to date". Isabel Glasgow of Exclaim! scored The Silver Cord a 7 out of 10, stating that its "hits overpower its misses" and while it "may not be one of the strongest King Gizzard albums, it's the strongest example of the band's versatility and thrill-seeking nature". Writing for Glide Magazine, Ryan Dillon called The Silver Cord "a meticulously pieced-together work of art ... the word 'infectious' does not even begin to describe the deep grooves displayed on this LP". In Relix, Ryan Reed wrote that this release "reaches a new peak of conceptual focus".

== Track listing ==
All tracks written by Stu Mackenzie, Ambrose Kenny-Smith, Joey Walker, Cook Craig, Lucas Harwood and Michael Cavanagh.

The vinyl release for the standard mix has tracks 1–4 on side A and tracks 5–7 on side B.

The Silver Cord standard track listing
No.	Title	Length
1.	"Theia"	3:24
2.	"The Silver Cord"	4:20
3.	"Set"	3:56
4.	"Chang'e"	3:46
5.	"Gilgamesh"	3:43
6.	"Swan Song"	4:25
7.	"Extinction"	4:40
Total length:		28:14

Standard vinyl hidden tracks
No.	Title	Length
1.	"Space Junk^{[a]}"	4:35
2.	"Plasma^{[b]}"	3:09
3.	"Embryo^{[c]}"	4:07
Total length:		40:05

The extended vinyl release has track 1 on side A, tracks 2 and 3 on side B, tracks 4 and 5 on side C, and tracks 6 and 7 on side D.

Extended Mix track listing
No.	Title	Length
1.	"Theia"	20:41
2.	"The Silver Cord"	12:45
3.	"Set"	10:18
4.	"Chang'e"	10:46
5.	"Gilgamesh"	11:16
6.	"Swan Song"	10:29
7.	"Extinction"	12:29
Total length:		88:44

Notes

- ^{^[a]} appears on the vinyl as A5.
- ^{^[b]} appears on the vinyl as B4.
- ^{^[c]} appears on the vinyl as B5.

== Personnel ==
King Gizzard & the Lizard Wizard

- Ambrose Kenny-Smith – vocals, synthesisers (Yamaha DX7, Moog Grandmother, Roland JX-3P), Mellotron
- Michael Cavanagh – electronic drums (Simmons Drum Synthesiser, Roland TD50X)
- Cook Craig – synthesisers (Roland Juno-X, Korg Poly-61, Yamaha DX7), guitar synthesiser (Casio DG-10), effects (Boss DD-7, EarthQuaker Devices Rainbow Machine, Strymon BlueSky)
- Joey Walker – vocals, loops (Roland RC-505), sequencer (Arturia Keystep Pro), drum machine (Roland TR-8), modular synthesiser (Mutable Instruments Plaits, Intellijel Quadrax, Happy Nerding FX Aid, Intellijel Metropolis, Befaco Hexmix, Intellijel Bifold, Make Noise Mimeophon, Make Noise Maths, Mutable Instruments Rings, Doepfer A-182-1 Switched Multiples, WMD Geiger Counter, Intellijel Quad VCA, ALM Pamela's New Workout, Joranalogue Filter 8, Noise Engineering Basimilus Iteritas Alter, Music Thing Turing Machine, Eowave Quadrantid Swarm, XAOC Devices Belgrad Dual Peak Filter, Mutable Instruments Ripples, Instruo Cs-L Complex Oscillator)
- Lucas Harwood – synthesisers (Moog Matriarch, Moog Sub 37, Yamaha Reface DX, Roland SH-01A)
- Stu Mackenzie – vocals, synthesisers (Roland Juno-60, Casio SK-5, Moog Matriarch, Roland Juno-X), guitar synthesiser (Casio DG-10), Ableton Push 2, Mellotron, drum machine (Roland TR-808), piano, effects (Boss ME-50, Boss DD-3, EarthQuaker Devices Rainbow Machine, Strymon BlueSky, Dunlop Cry Baby)

== Charts ==
Chart performance for The Silver Cord
Chart (2023–2025)	Peak position
Australian Albums (ARIA)	5
UK Album Downloads (Official Charts)	30
UK Dance Albums (Official Charts)	2
UK Progressive Albums (Official Charts)	8
