= 12 Bar Bruise =

Studio album by King Gizzard & the Lizard Wizard
- Released: 7 September 2012
- Genres: Garage rock; garage punk; acid rock
- Length: 34:18
- Label: Flightless

King Gizzard & the Lizard Wizard chronology
| Willoughby's Beach (2011) | 12 Bar Bruise (2012) | Eyes Like the Sky (2013) |

Singles from 12 Bar Bruise
- 1. "Bloody Ripper" Released: 3 April 2012; 2. "Elbow" Released: 30 July 2012

Professional ratings
Review scores
| Source | Rating |
|---|---|
| AllMusic | 3.5/5 stars |
| Kill your Stereo | 3.5/4 stars |
| Sydney Morning Herald | (Positive) |
| Sputnikmusic | 3.5/5 |
| themusic | (Positive) |

12 Bar Bruise is the debut studio album by Australian psychedelic rock band King Gizzard & the Lizard Wizard. It was released on 7 September 2012 on Flightless. It peaked at No. 14 on the ARIA Albums Chart after being released on vinyl in November 2018.

== Recording ==
The album was self-recorded by the band, and several tracks used unconventional recording methods. One of these is featured on the album's title track – it was recorded through four iPhones placed around a room while Stu Mackenzie sang into one of them.

== Track listing ==
Vinyl releases have tracks 1–6 on side A, and tracks 7–12 on side B.

12 Bar Bruise track listing
| No. | Title | Writer(s) | Length |
|---|---|---|---|
| 1. | "Elbow" | Stu Mackenzie | 2:40 |
| 2. | "Muckraker" | Mackenzie | 3:00 |
| 3. | "Nein" | Mackenzie | 2:52 |
| 4. | "12 Bar Bruise" | Mackenzie | 3:47 |
| 5. | "Garage Liddiard" | Mackenzie | 2:29 |
| 6. | "Sam Cherry's Last Shot" | Mackenzie | 2:49 |
| 7. | "High Hopes Low" | Mackenzie | 3:46 |
| 8. | "Cut Throat Boogie" | Mackenzie; Ambrose Kenny-Smith | 2:50 |
| 9. | "Bloody Ripper" | Mackenzie | 2:13 |
| 10. | "Uh Oh, I Called Mum" | Mackenzie | 2:38 |
| 11. | "Sea of Trees" | Mackenzie | 3:15 |
| 12. | "Footy Footy" | Mackenzie; Joey Walker | 1:59 |
| Total length: | | | 34:18 |

== Personnel ==
Credits for 12 Bar Bruise adapted from liner notes.

King Gizzard & the Lizard Wizard

- Michael Cavanagh – drums
- Cook Craig – guitar, vocals
- Ambrose Kenny-Smith – harmonica, vocals
- Stu Mackenzie – guitar, vocals
- Eric Moore – theremin, keys, percussion
- Lucas Harwood – bass, vocals
- Joey Walker – guitar, vocals

Additional musicians

- Broderick Smith – spoken word (track 6)

Production

- Paul Maybury – recording, mixing
- King Gizzard – recording, mixing
- Joseph Carra – mastering
- Jason Galea – cover art
- Ican Harem – inside cover
- Lauren Bamford – insert photo

== Charts ==
| Chart (2018) | Peak position |
|---|---|
| Australian Albums (ARIA) | 14 |

== Awards ==
12 Bar Bruise would win Best Independent Hard Rock, Heavy or Punk Album at the AIR Awards with the band receiving a $50,000 grant which allowed them to continue making more albums.
