= Evil Man =

Evil Man may refer to:

- Evil Man, a different recording of Evil Woman by the band Crow
- "Evil Man" (song), a song by King Gizzard & the Lizard Wizard
