= Fort Whipple =

Fort Whipple may refer to:

- Fort Whipple, Arizona, first capital of Arizona Territory
- Fort Whipple, Virginia, historical name for the U.S. Army's Fort Myer
- Fort Whipple, a song by King Gizzard & the Lizard Wizard, see Eyes Like the Sky
