= Fake Fruit =

Fake Fruit may refer to:

- Fake Fruit, a band based in Oakland, California
- Fake Fruit, a 2017 EP by Australian band the Slingers

== See also ==
- Food model
