= Young Blindness =

Studio album by the Murlocs
- Released: 18 March 2016
- Length: 34:16
- Label: Flightless
- Producer: Stu Mackenzie

The Murlocs chronology
Loopholes (2014)	Young Blindness (2016)	Old Locomotive (2017)

Young Blindness is the second studio album by Australian rock band the Murlocs. It was released by Flightless on 18 March 2016. Produced by Stu Mackenzie, it serves as a follow-up to their debut album, Loopholes (2014). It received mainly positive reviews from music critics.

== Critical reception ==
Professional ratings
Review scores
Source	Rating
FasterLouder	8/10 stars
The Music	3/5 stars
The Sydney Morning Herald	4/5 stars

Young Blindness received mainly positive reviews from music critics. Rob Inglis of FasterLouder said it "is nowhere near as depressing as its subject matter would suggest. Because who said incompetence can’t be any fun?" Brendan Telford of The Music called it "a crystalline, pristine pastiche of 21st century Nuggets-era nuggets". Addy Fong of Something You Said called it "an album which comforts despite its more somber lyrics through its use of repeated riffs and beach-like sounds". Patrick Emery of The Sydney Morning Herald noted that "the Murlocs' eyes are wide open" on it.

== Track listing ==
Track listing
No.	Title	Length
1.	"Happy Face"	3:28
2.	"Young Blindness"	2:49
3.	"Adolescence"	3:19
4.	"Rolling On"	3:19
5.	"Wolf Creep"	4:16
6.	"Compensation"	2:26
7.	"Unknown Disease"	2:34
8.	"Let Me Down Lightly"	2:39
9.	"Think Out Loud"	2:43
10.	"Improving Solutions"	3:21
11.	"Reassurance"	3:18
Total length:		34:16
