= Eyes Like the Sky =

Studio album by King Gizzard & the Lizard Wizard
- Released: 22 February 2013
- Recorded: November 2012
- Genre: Garage rock; Spaghetti Western
- Length: 27:49
- Label: Flightless

King Gizzard & the Lizard Wizard chronology
12 Bar Bruise (2012)	Eyes Like the Sky (2013)	Float Along – Fill Your Lungs (2013)

Eyes Like the Sky is the second studio album by Australian rock band King Gizzard & the Lizard Wizard. It was released on 22 February 2013 on the label Flightless.

Described as a "cult western audio book", the album is narrated and written by Broderick Smith, the frontman for the 1970s Australian rock group The Dingoes and the father of King Gizzard keyboardist Ambrose Kenny-Smith. The story revolves around child soldiers, Native Americans and gun fights, all set in the American frontier.

When asked about the album's influences, Stu Mackenzie alluded to the spaghetti western influence throughout the album, stating "I love Western films. I love bad guys and I love Red Dead Redemption. Oh, and I love evil guitars".

== Track listing ==
Vinyl releases have tracks 1–5 on side A, and tracks 6–10 on side B.

All lyrics are written by Broderick Smith; all music is composed by Stu Mackenzie.

Eyes Like the Sky track listing
No.	Title	Length
1.	"Eyes Like the Sky"	3:17
2.	"Year of Our Lord"	2:57
3.	"The Raid"	2:24
4.	"Drum Run"	2:42
5.	"Evil Man"	3:54
6.	"Fort Whipple"	2:56
7.	"The God Man's Goat Lust"	3:17
8.	"The Killing Ground"	2:50
9.	"Dust in the Wind"	2:24
10.	"Guns & Horses"	1:08
Total length:		27:49

== Personnel ==
Credits for Eyes Like the Sky adapted from liner notes.

- King Gizzard & the Lizard Wizard – music writing, arrangement, recording, mixing
  - Michael Cavanagh
  - Cook Craig
  - Ambrose Kenny-Smith
  - Eric Moore
  - Stu Mackenzie
  - Lucas Harwood
  - Joe Walker
- Broderick Smith – story writing, narration recording
- Jason Galea – cover art
- Joseph Carra – mastering

== Charts ==
Chart performance for Eyes Like the Sky
Chart (2018)	Peak position
Australian Albums (ARIA)	10
