= Flightless (record label) =

Australian record label

Flightless Records
- Logo showing an Emu
- Founded: 2012
- Founder: Eric Moore
- Distributor: ATO Records (2018–present)
- Genre: Psychedelic rock; garage punk; garage rock; indie rock; heavy metal; punk rock
- Country of origin: Australia
- Location: Coburg, Victoria, Australia
- Official website: flightlessrecords.com

Flightless is an Australian independent record label, founded in Melbourne in 2012 by former King Gizzard & the Lizard Wizard member Eric Moore. Originally founded to release both King Gizzard's music and that of associated acts such as The Murlocs, Flightless signed other Melbourne-based bands, including Tropical Fuck Storm, Stonefield and Amyl and the Sniffers. Following Moore's departure from King Gizzard most of these bands would withdraw from the label, however, the label continues to persist with new smaller bands.

== History ==
Flightless was started in 2012 in Melbourne by drummer Eric Moore as a label for his band King Gizzard & the Lizard Wizard, after he was unsuccessful in trying to get the band signed to existing labels. The label's earliest releases were shipped in pizza boxes, and the vinyl runs were small and limited.

In 2015, Flightless hosted the first annual Gizzfest, a music festival featuring bands on the Flightless label as well as others in the psychedelic and garage rock scene. The inaugural festival was held at the Corner Hotel in Melbourne, on 2 and 3 May 2015. The festival returned for the subsequent three years, expanding into a touring festival visiting cities around Australia, including Perth, Brisbane, Sydney, Adelaide and Melbourne. The festival began welcoming international bands such as Mild High Club, Kikagaku Moyo, Altın Gün, and The Mystery Lights to the lineup. The festival took a hiatus in 2019 due to King Gizzard's touring schedule. In 2019 Moore stated that a 2020 iteration of the festival was planned, but due to the COVID-19 pandemic, the festival did not occur.

In 2018, Flightless formed a distribution partnership with ATO Records. The following year, the label opened Flightless 168, a public record store located on Lygon Street in the Melbourne suburb of Brunswick East.

The Flightless website experienced a major crash on 14 September 2018, following the reissue of King Gizzard & the Lizard Wizard's albums Willoughby's Beach, 12 Bar Bruise, Eyes Like The Sky, Float Along – Fill Your Lungs and Oddments, as well as some promotional merchandise. The crash was colloquially dubbed 'The Great Flightless Crash' by fans, and resulted in Flightless printing a series of stickers to commemorate it.

In August 2020, founder Eric Moore left King Gizzard & the Lizard Wizard amid a dispute on the direction of the band to focus full time on Flightless.

In October 2020, King Gizzard & the Lizard Wizard launched their own web store, selling their own independently produced merchandise and vinyl.

On 6 May 2024, King Gizzard & the Lizard Wizard announced they were publishing under their own record label, p(doom).

March 2021 saw the first annual Flightless Family Folk Festival, a one day festival in Melbourne featuring a mix of Flightless and Non-Flightless folk musicians.

The Flightless 168 store closed its doors in June 2021, preceding the label's move to a new warehouse in Coburg, Australia. The new store, Flightless Factory, opened online in August 2021, with a retail store coming in the future.

Flightless maintains an ethos of environmental friendliness. Since 2019 their vinyl releases have come in cardboard sleeves as an alternative to shrink wrap, with some records produced in an eco-friendly factory through Deepgrooves Vinyl Pressing Plant. Their vinyl shipping mailers feature environmentally friendly messaging, and the label also sells apparel with similar messaging and designs.

== Catalogue ==
List of releases
No.	Band	Release	Notes
FLT - 001	King Gizzard & the Lizard Wizard	12 Bar Bruise	Original 2012 release of 500 - Clear with red splatter wax
FLT - 001R	King Gizzard & the Lizard Wizard	12 Bar Bruise	2018 re-release of 5000 - Clear with heavy mint and purple splatter wax
FLT - 002	The Murlocs	TeePee	2012 release, of 300, CDs
FLT - 003	Love Migrate	Plagued Are All My Thoughts, Like White Ants In The Fence	2012 release, of 300, CDs
FLT - 004	Sleep Decade	Into Spinning Lights	n/a
FLT - 005	King Gizzard & the Lizard Wizard	Eyes Like The Sky	Original 2013 release of 500 - Solid blue
FLT - 005R	King Gizzard & the Lizard Wizard	Eyes Like The Sky	2018 re-release of 5000 - clear with aqua blue smoke wax
FLT - 006	King Gizzard & the Lizard Wizard	Float Along - Fill Your Lungs	Australia release
FLT - 007	Love Migrate	Dissolved	n/a
FLT - 008	Sagamore	Sagamore	n/a
FLT - 009	King Gizzard & the Lizard Wizard	Oddments	Australian release
FLT - 010	The Murlocs	Loopholes	n/a
FLT - 011	King Gizzard & the Lizard Wizard	Float Along - Fill Your Lungs / Oddments	USA releases
FLT - 012	King Gizzard & the Lizard Wizard	I'm In Your Mind Fuzz	n/a
FLT - 013	Sagamore	Longer	n/a
FLT - 014	The Living Eyes	Living Large	n/a
FLT - 015	King Gizzard & the Lizard Wizard	Quarters!	n/a
FLT - 016	Pipe-eye	Cosmic Blip	Original version
FLT - 016R	Pipe-eye	Cosmic Blip	Extended version
FLT - 017	Love Migrate	Shimmer Through The Night	n/a
FLT - 018	Babe Rainbow	Babe Rainbow	n/a
FLT - 019	Leah Senior	Summer's On The Ground	n/a
FLT - 020	The Murlocs	Young Blindness	n/a
FLT - 021	Thee Oh Sees	Mutilator Defeated At Last	n/a
FLT - 022	ORB	Migration	7" single
FLT - 023	King Gizzard & the Lizard Wizard	Paper Mâché Dream Balloon	n/a
FLT - 024	The Murlocs	Rolling On/Compensation	7" single
FLT - 025	King Gizzard & the Lizard Wizard	Nonagon Infinity	n/a
FLT - 026	ORB	Birth	n/a
FLT - 027	Pipe-eye	Laugh About Life	n/a
FLT - 028	King Gizzard & the Lizard Wizard	Flying Microtonal Banana	n/a
FLT - 029	Babe Rainbow	The Babe Rainbow	n/a
FLT - 030	Leah Senior	Pretty Faces	n/a
FLT - 031DVD	Zonk Vision	A-Z	n/a
FLT - 032	ORB	Naturality	n/a
FLT - 033	King Gizzard & the Lizard Wizard	Murder Of The Universe	n/a
FLT - 034	The Murlocs	Old Locomotive	n/a
FLT - 035	King Gizzard & the Lizard Wizard	Sketches Of Brunswick East	With Mild High Club
FLT - 036	King Gizzard & the Lizard Wizard	Polygondwanaland	Released for free as a bootleg, but Flightless also pressed and sold records
FLT - 037	King Gizzard & the Lizard Wizard	Gumboot Soup	n/a
FLT - 038	Stonefield	Far From Earth	n/a
FLT - 039	Babe Rainbow	Double Rainbow	n/a
FLT - 040	King Gizzard & the Lizard Wizard	Willoughby's Beach	n/a
FLT - 041	ORB	The Space Between	n/a
FLT - 042	Beans	Babble	n/a
FLT - 043	Amyl & The Sniffers	Some Mutts (Can't Be Muzzled)	n/a
FLT - 044	Traffik Island	Nature Strip	n/a
FLT - 045	Leah Senior	Graves	Digital single
FLT - 046	The Murlocs	Manic Candid Episode	n/a
FLT - 047	King Gizzard & the Lizard Wizard	Cyboogie	7" single
FLT - 048	King Gizzard & the Lizard Wizard	Fishing for Fishies	n/a
FLT - 049	Tim Presley's White Fence	I Have to Feed Larry's Hawk	n/a
FLT - 050	Pipe-eye	Inside/Outside	n/a
FLT - 051	Amyl & The Sniffers	Amyl and the Sniffers	n/a
FLT - 052	Stonefield	BENT	n/a
FLT - 053	King Gizzard & the Lizard Wizard	INFEST THE RATS NEST	n/a
FLT - 054	Tropical Fuck Storm	Braindrops	n/a
FLT - 055	Babe Rainbow	Today	n/a
FLT - 056	Traffik Island	Peanut Butter Traffik Jam	n/a
FLT - 057	Grace Cummings	Refuge Cove	n/a
FLT - 058	Bullant	Tyson, Crying	n/a
FLT - 059	Leah Senior	The Passing Scene	n/a
FLT - 060	King Gizzard & the Lizard Wizard	Chunky Shrapnel	Live album
FLT - 061	Tropical Fuck Storm	Suburbiopia	7" single
FLT - 063	Beans	All Together Now	n/a
FLT - 064	The Murlocs	Bittersweet Demons	n/a
FLT - 065	King Gizzard & the Lizard Wizard	K.G.	n/a
FLT - 066	King Gizzard & the Lizard Wizard	L.W.	n/a
FLT - 067	Tropical Fuck Storm	Legal Ghost	7" single
FLT - 068	Various	Love Hurts	Compilation album of various Flightless artists and friends
FLT - 069 was reportedly a coffee table book by Melbourne cartoonist Benny Montero but was never released
FLT - 070	King Gizzard & the Lizard Wizard	Live In San Francisco ‘16	Live album
FLT - 071	The Murlocs	Uncle Murl Presents: The Murlocs - S/T EP & TEE PEE EP	n/a
FLT - 072	CIVIC	Radiant Eye	7" single
FLT - 073	The Slingers	The Cruellest Cut	7" single
FLT - 074	Babe Rainbow	Zeitgeist	7" single
FLT - 074	King Gizzard & the Lizard Wizard	K.G. / L.W.	Combined re-issue
FLT - 076	Skegss	Rehearsal	n/a
FLT - 077	CIVIC	Future Forecast	n/a
FLT - 078	Babe Rainbow	Babe Rainbow	7" single
FLT - 079	Babe Rainbow	Babe Rainbow	n/a
FLT - 080	Pipe-eye	Dream Themes	n/a
FLT - 081	ORB	Womb	n/a
FLT - 082	Traffik Island	A Shrug Of The Shoulders	n/a
FLT - 083 was reportedly going to be an EP by the Melbourne based Bitch Diesel, but they pulled out with the slot being skipped over
FLT - 084	Eggy	With Gusto	n/a
FLT - 085	The Slingers	Sentimentalism	n/a
FLT - 086	ORB	Tailem Bend	n/a
FLT - 087	Eggy	From Time to Time	n/a
