= The Slingers =

Australian alt-country group

- Origin: Melbourne, Victoria, Australia
- Genre: Alternative country
- Years active: 2017–present
- Label: Flightless

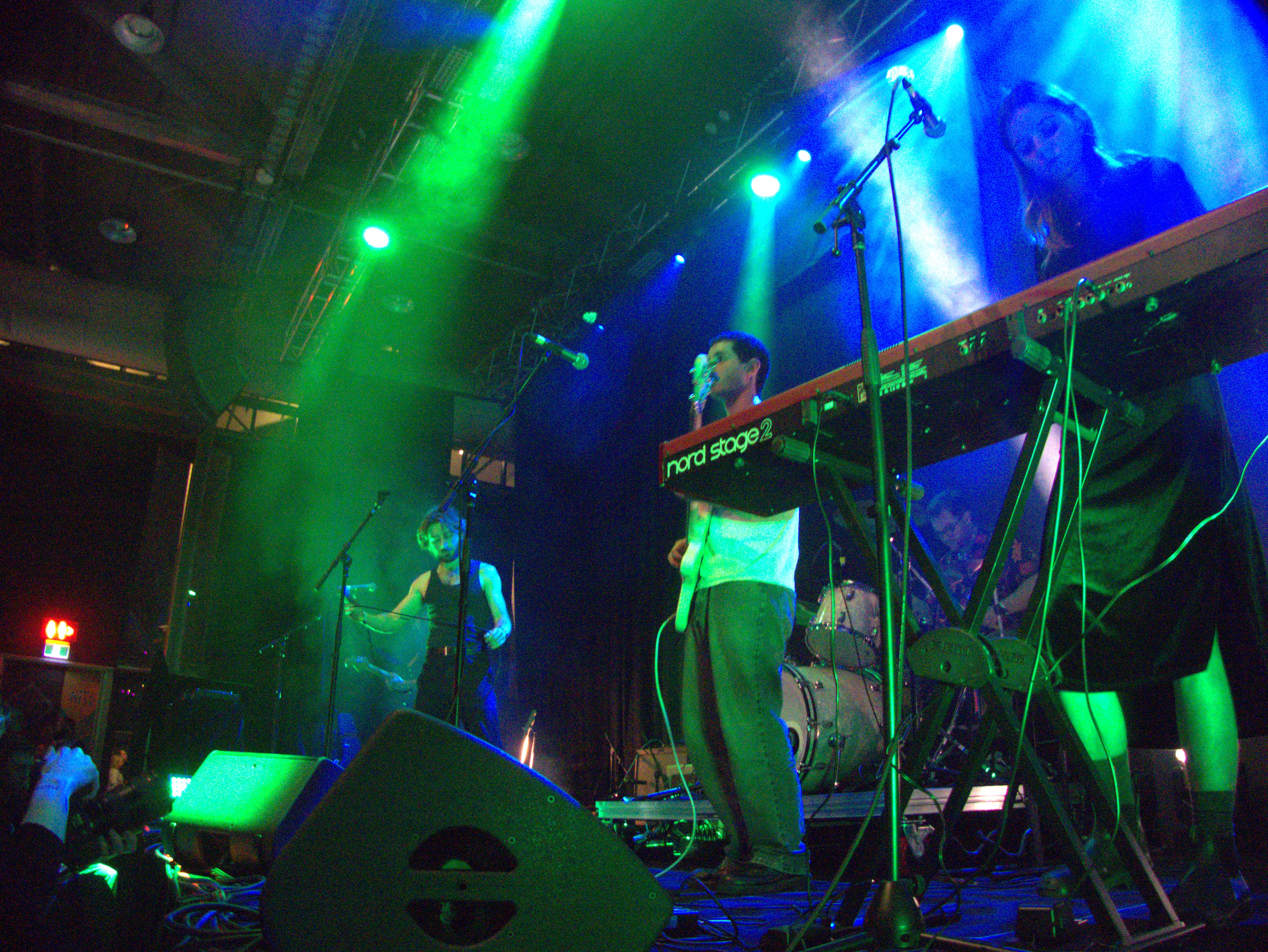
The Slingers performing at Seasonal Fruits Festival in Brisbane, September 2023

The Slingers are an Australian alt-country group from Melbourne. They released their debut studio album Sentimentalism in July 2023.

== History ==
=== 2017–present: Formation and Sentimentalism ===
The Slingers released their debut EP Fake Fruit in June 2017. This was followed by Satin Coffin in June 2020.

The Slingers released their debut studio album Sentimentalism on 7 July 2023. Vocalist Robert J. Mahon said, "It's about people finding love as they struggle through the age of loneliness. We certainly don't want to come across as cynical or making some sort of grand social commentary. It's about love, and it's a happy thing."

== Discography ==
=== Albums ===
List of albums, with selected details
Title	Album details	Peak chart positions
Title	Album details	AUS
Sentimentalism	Released: 7 July 2023; Label: Flightless (FLT-085); Format: LP, digital	59

=== Extended plays ===
List of EPs, with selected details
Title	Details
Fake Fruit	Released: June 2017; Label: The Slingers; Format: Digital
Satin Coffin	Released: June 2020; Label: The Slingers; Format: Digital
