= Cook Craig =

Australian singer

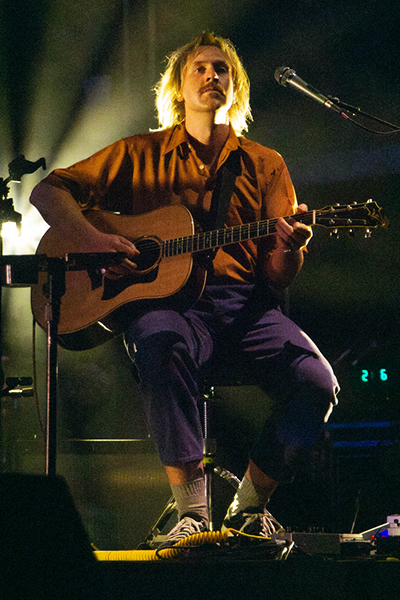
- Craig performing with King Gizzard & the Lizard Wizard in 2023

Background information
- Born: Nicholas Roderick Craig; Australia
- Genres: Psychedelic rock; garage rock; psychedelic pop
- Occupations: Musician; singer; songwriter
- Instruments: Guitar; vocals; bass guitar; keyboards
- Years active: 2008–present
- Labels: Flightless; p(doom)
- Member of: King Gizzard & the Lizard Wizard; The Murlocs

Nicholas Roderick "Cook" Craig is an Australian musician, singer and songwriter and is a part of groups King Gizzard & the Lizard Wizard and the Murlocs. Craig also releases music under the alias Pipe-eye.

== Solo history ==
Cosmic Blip, the first EP under Craig's Pipe-eye alias, was released in 2015. The EP was recorded in his bedroom in Fairfield, Victoria. Nicholas Johnson from The Brag gave the EP 4 out of 5, saying "Pipe-Eye knows how to spit some serious cosmic wisdom. Then they leave you to ponder it over the course of the 30 to 60 second segue tracks that pepper the record. It adds a nice buffer to what is otherwise essentially a four-track EP by giving it a theatrical feel… It may not resonate with everyone, I'm sure some will feel cheated by the 50 per cent split between songs and noisy interludes. But it gives the songs – all of which would stand quite nicely as singles – a little bit of breathing space without the risk of adding half-baked tracks for the sake of filler."

Pipe-eye's debut studio album Laugh About Life was written over two years and released in April 2017.

Pipe-eye's second studio album Inside/Outside was released in June 2019. Jonathan Reynoso from Beat Magazine gave the album a 6.5 out of 10.

In April 2021, Pipe-eye re-released Cosmic Blip and Laugh About Life on limited edition LP. They debuted at numbers one and two on the ARIA Vinyl chart for the week commencing 12 April 2021.

On 18 October 2024, Pipe-eye released Pipe-defy, his first LP to be released under p(doom) Records. It was described as "a stylistic departure from his previous albums", incorporating funk and synth elements from '70's and 80's dance songs.

== Discography ==
=== Studio albums ===
List of studio albums, with selected details and chart positions
Title	Details	Peak chart positions
Title	Details	AUS
Laugh About Life	Released: April 21, 2017; Label: Flightless (FLT-027); Formats: CD, LP, digital download, streaming	88
Inside/Outside	Released: June 7, 2019; Label: Flightless (FLT-050); Formats: LP, digital download, streaming	—
Dream Themes	Released: November 26, 2021; Label: Flightless (FLT-080); Formats: LP, digital download, streaming	—
Pipe-defy	Released: October 18, 2024; Label: p(doom); Formats: LP, digital download, streaming	—

=== With King Gizzard & the Lizard Wizard ===
- 12 Bar Bruise (2012)
- Eyes Like the Sky (with Broderick Smith, 2013)
- Float Along – Fill Your Lungs (2013)
- Oddments (2014)
- I'm in Your Mind Fuzz (2014)
- Quarters! (2015)
- Paper Mâché Dream Balloon (2015)
- Nonagon Infinity (2016)
- Flying Microtonal Banana (2017)
- Murder of the Universe (ft. Leah Senior, 2017)
- Sketches of Brunswick East (with Mild High Club, 2017)
- Polygondwanaland (2017)
- Gumboot Soup (2017)
- Fishing for Fishies (2019)
- Infest the Rats' Nest (2019)
- K.G. (2020)
- L.W. (2021)
- Butterfly 3000 (2021)
- Made in Timeland (2022)
- Omnium Gatherum (2022)
- Ice, Death, Planets, Lungs, Mushrooms and Lava (2022)
- Laminated Denim (2022)
- Changes (2022)
- PetroDragonic Apocalypse (2023)
- The Silver Cord (2023)
- Flight b741 (2024)
- Phantom Island (2025)
- Alien Metal (2026)

=== Extended plays ===
List of EPs, with selected details and chart positions
Title	Details	Peak chart positions
Title	Details	AUS
Cosmic Blip	Released: September 25, 2015; Label: Flightless (FLT-016); Formats: LP, digital download, streaming	64
