= Eric Moore (drummer) =

Australian drummer

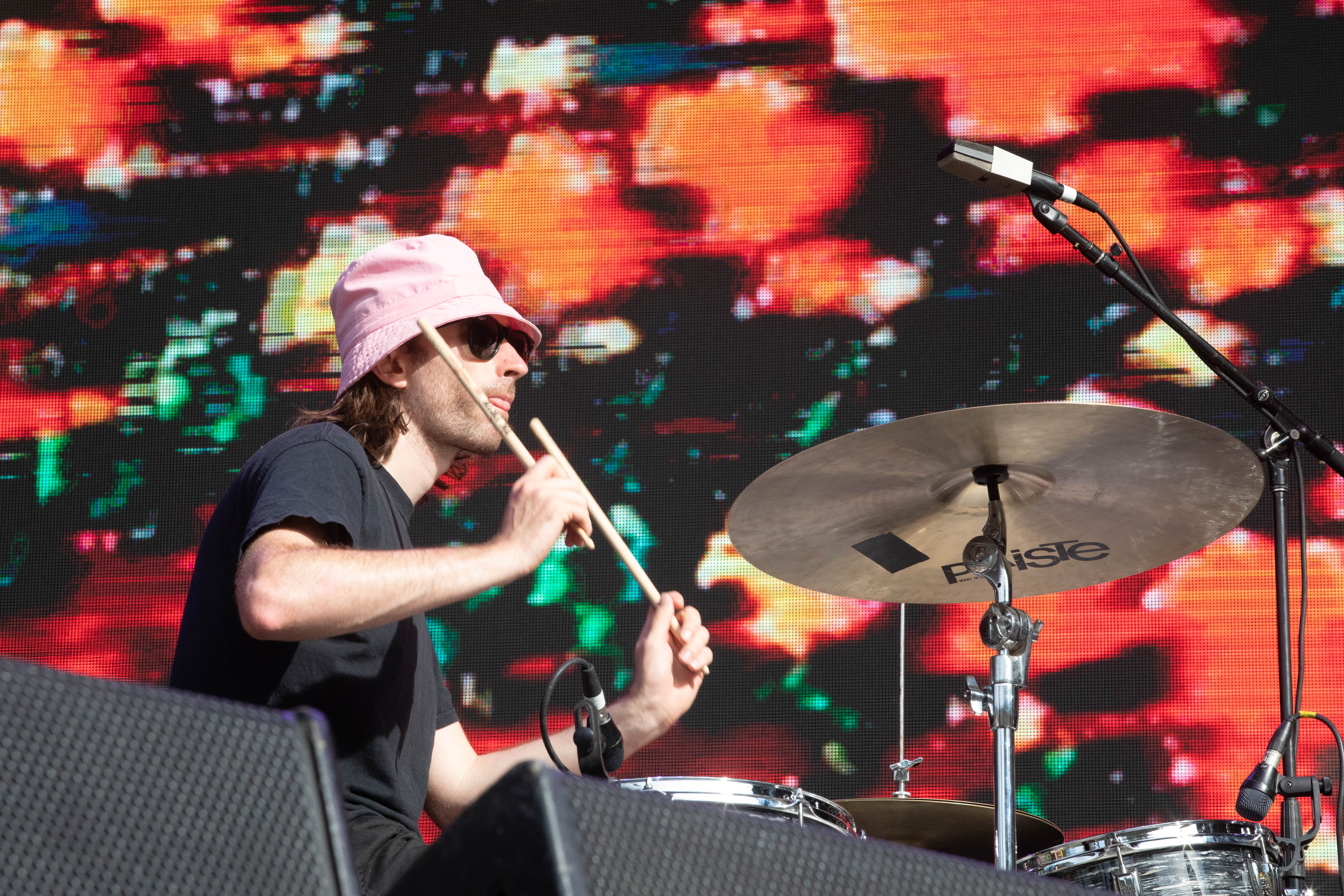
- Moore playing at a concert in Sydney in 2019

Background information
- Occupations: Drummer, manager
- Instruments: Drums, percussion, theremin, keyboards
- Years active: 2009–2020, 2022 (musician); 2010–present (manager)
- Label: Flightless
- Formerly of: Love Migrate; King Gizzard and the Lizard Wizard

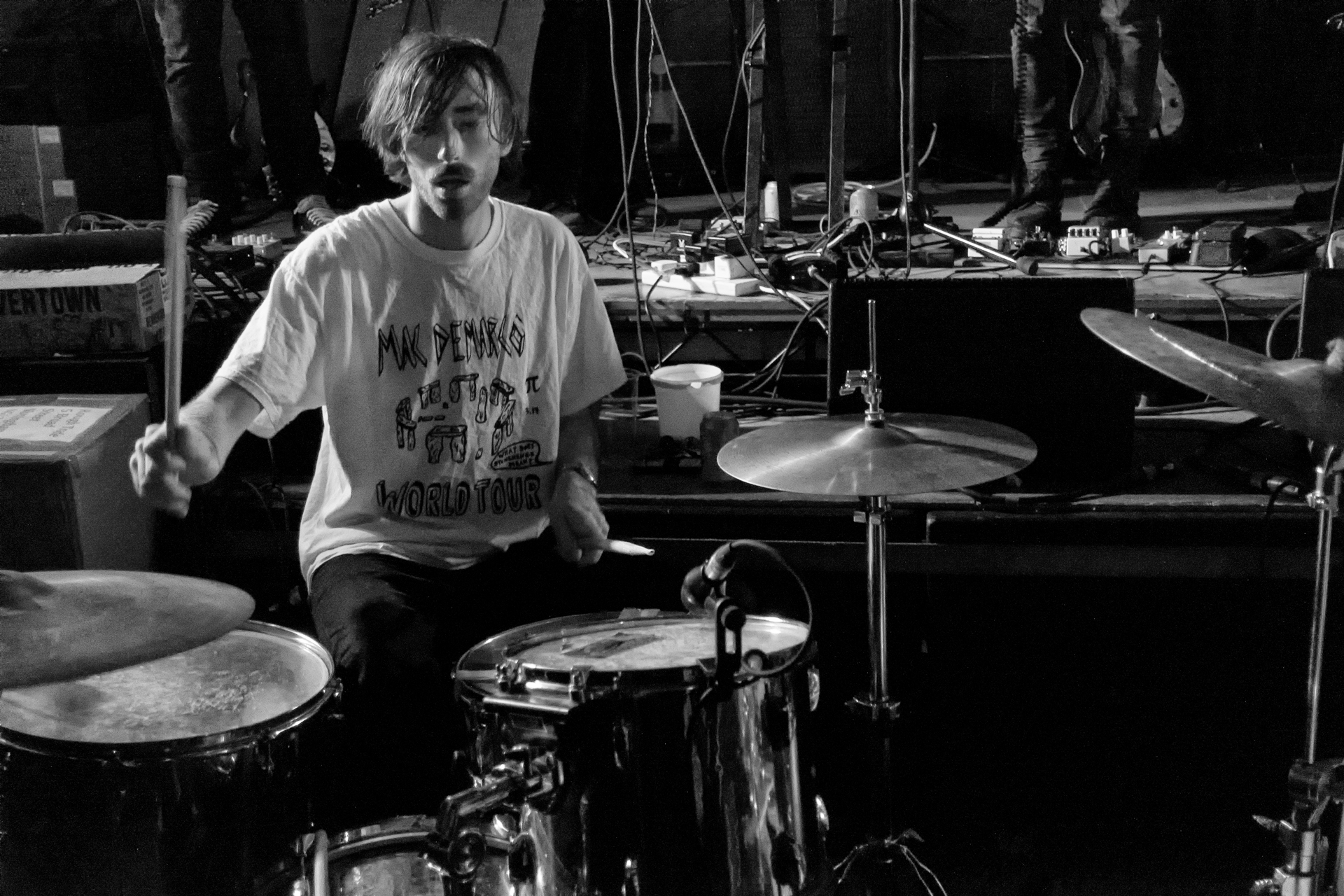
Moore wearing a Mac DeMarco shirt playing at Rough Trade East in London on 1 December 2014

Eric Moore is an Australian music manager, label runner and former drummer, as well as one of the three founding members of King Gizzard and the Lizard Wizard before departing the band on 25 August 2020.

== Biography ==
Starting in 2009 Moore was in a band named Goodnight Owl along with Joey Walker and his sister Bella led by frontman Eddie Alexander that in 2011 was renamed to Love Migrate. Eric would be a member of Love Migrate until sometime after the release of their EP Shimmer Through The Night in 2015.

Moore was a founding member of King Gizzard and the Lizard Wizard in 2010, going to school with fellow band members in Geelong and Deniliquin. The band was initially a group of students of a Royal Melbourne Institute of Technology Bachelor of Contemporary Music Performance course; Moore, Stu Mackenzie, Joey Walker, Lucas Harwood, and Michael Cavanagh. The band continued to grow to a stable seven members, including Cook Craig and Ambrose Kenny-Smith.

Both Moore and Cavanagh were drummers, however, Moore started as the band's manager, before shifting to also playing drums. Oftentimes the band would initially record with just Cavanagh on the initial track, with Moore's drums being overdubbed on top. As such, Moore had limited practice for live shows and had limited rehearsals, instead "adapting" to Cavanagh's playing style.

As the band's manager, Moore founded Flightless Records in 2012 when no other record label would sign them in order to get their music out to audiences. During the label's early years he would ship albums in any old container, including pizza boxes, before signing a deal with ATO Records for an exclusive label and distribution partnership. During his time at both King Gizzard and the Lizard Wizard and Flightless, Moore also signed the Murlocs, Stonefield, Orb, The Babe Rainbow, Tropical Fuck Storm, and Amyl and the Sniffers to the record label. It was Moore's idea to release the band's 12th album, Polygondwanaland, for free. Moore was also one of the principal supporters of Gizzfest, the band's former festival.

On 25 August 2020, Moore posted to Flightless Records that he would be departing from the band without giving a specific reason why. The departure came after the release of Chunky Shrapnel, while the band was working on K.G.. Moore stated that he would continue to work with King Gizzard and the Lizard Wizard as a member of Flightless. Shortly after the band released a statement that they were "sad to see him go" and that Eric would be focusing on Flightless full-time.

In an interview in 2021 the band said of Moore's departure; "In terms of the music creation process, it hasn't changed a huge amount" and that Moore "was always the label guy". Shortly after Moore's departure in 2020, King Gizzard and the Lizard Wizard pulled out of Flightless Records, opting instead to independently release their albums under their own label KGLW, which would later be replaced by p(doom) Records. However, exceptions were made for K.G., L.W., and Made in Timeland. King Gizzard and the Lizard Wizard would be joined shortly by most of Flightless' other acts, including The Murlocs, on their own label.

In 2022, Moore made a brief return to music when he filled in on drums for Shannon and the Clams on their Australian tour.
