= Michael Cavanagh (drummer) =

Australian drummer

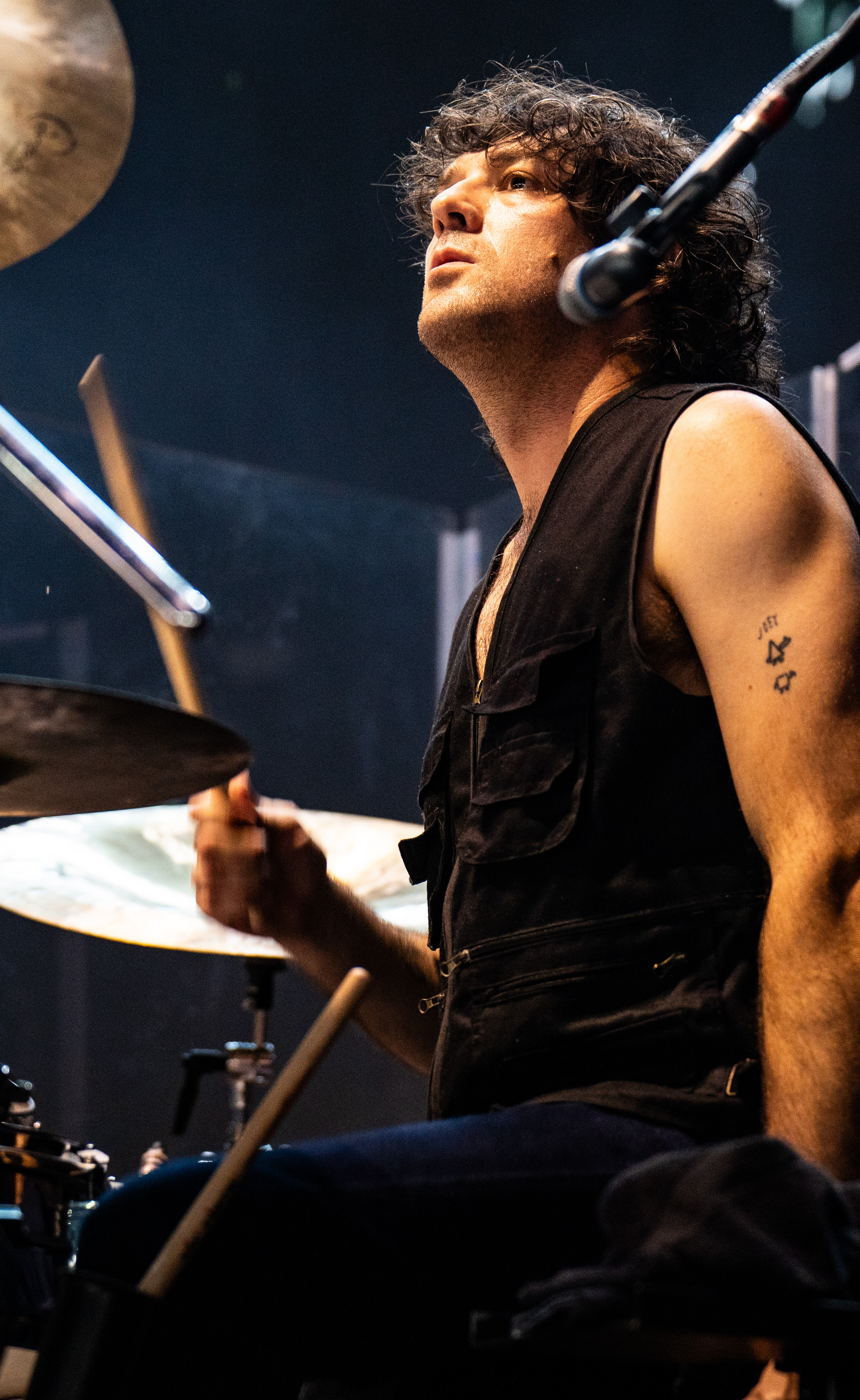
- Cavanagh performing in 2025

Background information
- Also known as: CAVS, Mickey
- Born: July 5, 1990 (age 36)
- Occupation: Drummer
- Years active: 2005–present
- Member of: King Gizzard and the Lizard Wizard
- Formerly of: The Houses
- Spouse: Amy Findlay (m. 2019)

Michael Cavanagh (born 5 July 1990) is an Australian drummer best known for being the drummer for King Gizzard and the Lizard Wizard. He also releases solo music under the pseudonym CAVS.

== Musical career ==
Cavanagh grew up in Deniliquin, New South Wales and was drawn to drumming at an early age. Cavanagh became the drummer for a band called The Houses which was formed in 2005 and by 2010 consisted of him, Lucas Skinner, Blaise Adamson, and Stu Mackenzie. However, despite this, he was not an original member of King Gizzard and the Lizard Wizard, which was formed by Mackenzie, Joey Walker, and Eric Moore in 2010, rather, he joined the band via an audition.

=== King Gizzard and the Lizard Wizard ===
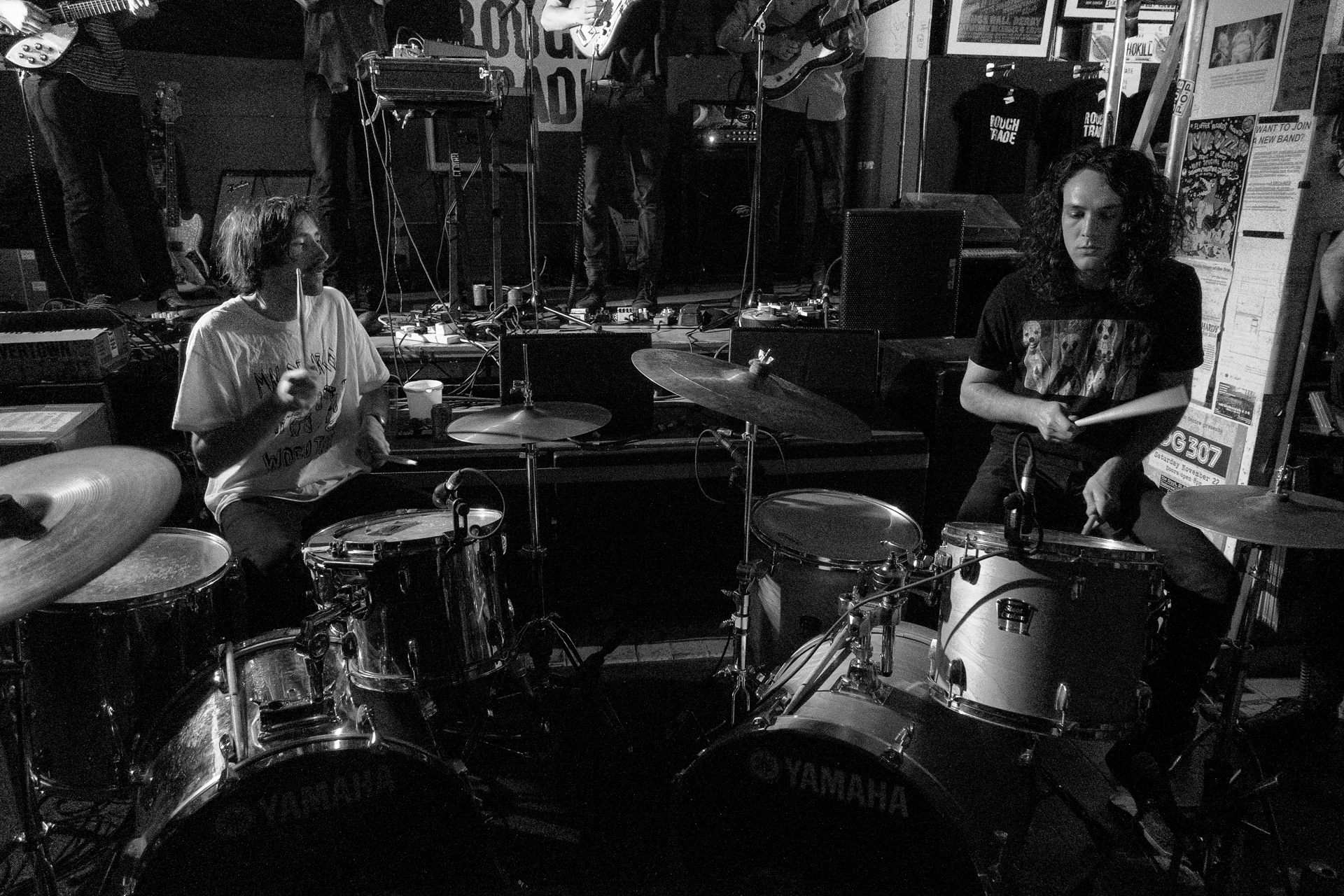
Cavanagh (right) and Moore (left) performing at Rough Trade East in London.

Cavanagh would join the band as their dedicated drummer, with Eric Moore as the band's manager. However, Moore, who also played drums for Love Migrate, started being the band's second drummer as their songs became more complex. Besides their highly prolific discography, King Gizzard was also known due to their novelty of having two drummers. Cavanagh, the more experienced drummer, would often take the lead, with Moore "adapting" to match his play style, as most of the songs were written with Cavanagh on drums, with Moore only playing drums during live performances. On August 25, 2020, Moore would post to the Flightless website that he would be stepping away from King Gizzard and the Lizard Wizard, leaving Cavanagh as the only drummer.

In 2022, while touring in Greece, Cavanagh would come down with COVID-19 and would be replaced for two shows by a drum machine.

=== Solo career ===
On June 8, 2021, Cavanagh announced that he would release a solo album of some of his drum solos under the pseudonym CAVS. Alongside this announcement came a video of a ten-minute solo dubbed T2JD, directed by John Stewart (who made other Gizzard music videos, including the video for "Some of Us"). The self-titled album CAVS would be released on July 9. He would release another single, Gun Point on August 28 of that year.

On February 24, 2026, a second CAVS solo album was announced, titled Sojourn. The album was produced by Mildlife drummer Jim Rindfleish alongside collaborations from other Melbourne-based musicians, and was described as a "journey through Cavs' rythmic imagination". The album was announced alongside a lead single, Candiru.

== Discography ==
=== Studio albums (as CAVS) ===
Title	Details	Peak chart positions
Title	Details	AUS
CAVS	Released: 9 July 2021; Label: PHC Films (PHC-002); Formats: LP, streaming	—
Sojourn	Released: 24 April 2026; Label: p(doom) Records (PDOOM-018LP); Formats: LP, streaming	88

=== Singles (as CAVS) ===
Title	Details
T2JD	Released: 7 June 2021; Label: PHC Films; Formats: Streaming
Swordfish	Released: 18 June 2021; Label: PHC Films; Formats: Streaming
Fury Gong	Released: 7 July 2021; Label: PHC Films; Formats: Single, streaming
Gun Point	Released: 28 August 2021; Label: PHC Films; Formats: Single, streaming
Candiru	Released: 24 February 2026; Label: p(doom) Records; Formats: Single, streaming
First Light	Released: 26 March 2026; Label: p(doom) Records; Formats: Single, streaming

== Personal life ==
Cavanagh is married to Amy née Findlay, the drummer for Stonefield.
