= Ambrose Kenny-Smith =

Australian musician (born 1992)

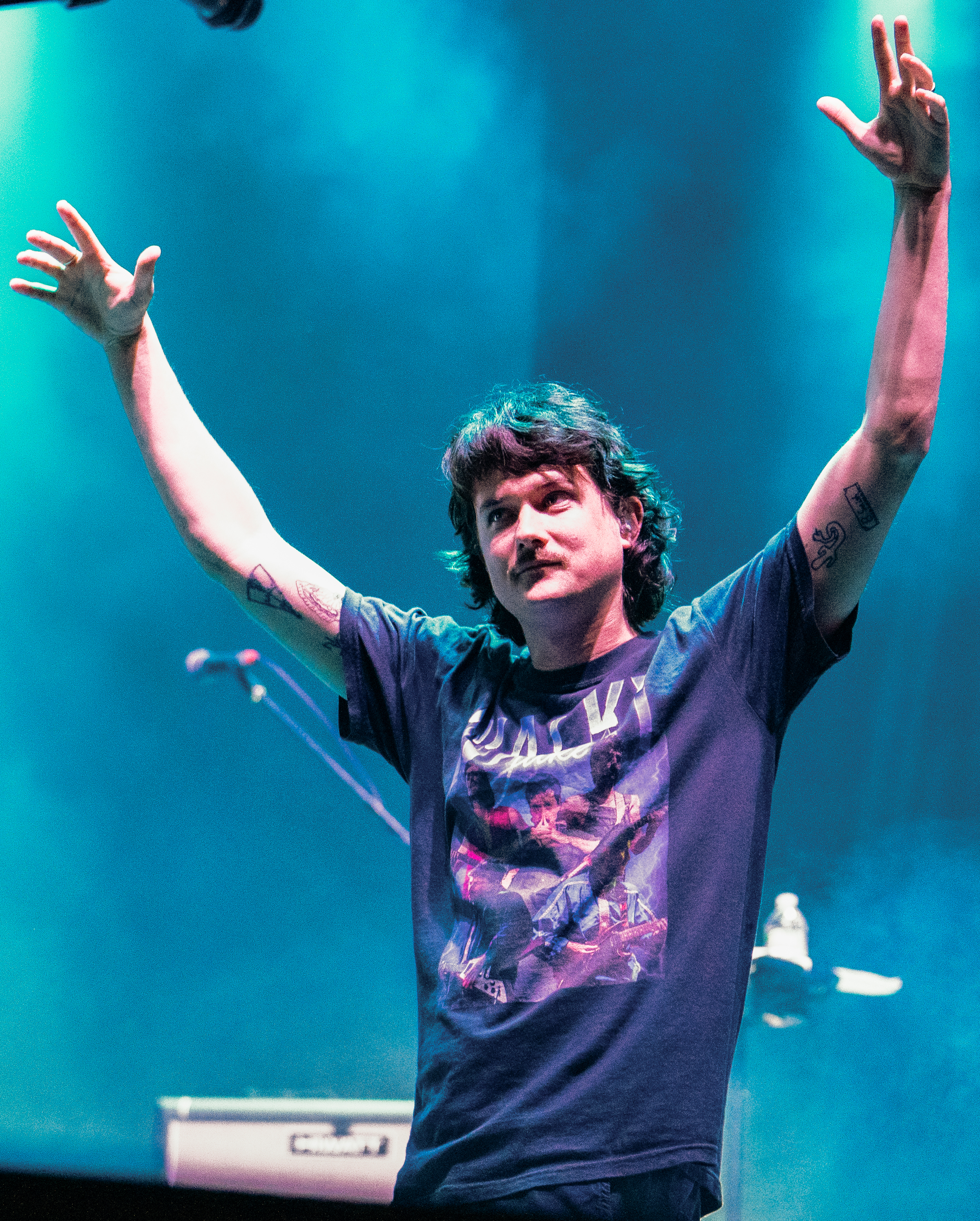
- Kenny-Smith in 2024
- Born: Ambrose Thomas Kenny-Smith; 20 July 1992 (age 34)
- Other names: Amby, Kenny, Uncle Murl, Shrimp, Shrimpomaniac
- Occupations: Singer; musician; songwriter; skater
- Years active: 2000-present
- Spouse: Tessa Kenny-Smith (m. 2023)
- Parents: Broderick Smith; Louise Francesca Kenny
- Musical career
- Origin: Geelong, Victoria, Australia
- Genres: Blues rock; psychedelic rock; garage rock
- Instruments: Harmonica; vocals; keyboards; percussion; guitar; saxophone
- Labels: p(doom); Flightless; ATO
- Member of: King Gizzard & the Lizard Wizard; The Murlocs
- Formerly of: Sambrose Automobile

Ambrose Thomas Kenny-Smith (born 20 July 1992) is an Australian singer, songwriter and multi‑instrumentalist. He is a member of King Gizzard & the Lizard Wizard, to which he contributes vocals, harmonica, keyboards, saxophone, and occasionally guitar, and the lead vocalist and harmonica player of the Murlocs. With the Murlocs, Kenny‑Smith earned multiple entries on the ARIA Charts, including a top ten for Bittersweet Demons (2021). In 2024 he released the collaborative album Ill Times with Jay Watson (as GUM), the inaugural release on King Gizzard's label p(doom) Records.

== Early life ==
Kenny-Smith was born in Geelong, Victoria, and grew up in Castlemaine and Ocean Grove. His father was musician and actor Broderick Smith, and his mother is model and yoga instructor Lou (Louise) Kenny. Kenny‑Smith was a talented skateboarder in his youth, gaining sponsorships and living a nomadic lifestyle, before turning his main focus to music. He has recalled being teased by older skateboarding peers for his interest in music.

=== Influences ===
Kenny‑Smith has cited influences including John Lennon, Harry Nilsson, John and Emma Rhodes, Muddy Waters, Howlin' Wolf, Sonny Terry, Etta James, and The Blues Brothers. His first musical experiences involved listening to blues records as he fell asleep and busking. He started a band called Sambrose Automobile with Sam Cooper, Lucas Skinner, and Lonnie Carland in 2007, influenced by Delta blues and soul music.

== Career ==
=== King Gizzard & the Lizard Wizard ===
Kenny‑Smith joined Melbourne band King Gizzard & the Lizard Wizard early in its history, becoming the last member of the group's core lineup. After seeing the band perform, he joined at age 17 while the other members of the band were in college together, taking up harmonica for them. Within the band he contributes vocals, harmonica, keyboards and saxophone on recordings and in concert. King Gizzard's 2013 album Eyes Like the Sky, a spoken‑word “Western audio‑book” concept record, was narrated by Kenny‑Smith's father, Australian musician Broderick Smith.

=== The Murlocs ===
Kenny‑Smith fronts the Murlocs as lead singer and harmonica player. The group's garage‑rock and R&B‑tinged sound has been noted for his “powerful, wailing” vocals and gritty harmonica. The band achieved its first ARIA Top 20 appearances with Old Locomotive (No. 15, 2017) and Manic Candid Episode (No. 16, 2019), and entered the top ten with Bittersweet Demons (No. 6; also No. 1 on the ARIA Vinyl Albums Chart) in 2021. The protagonist on the Murlocs’ 2022 concept album Rapscallion was inspired by Kenny‑Smith's time skateboarding and living more nomadically during his youth.

=== Collaboration with GUM (Ill Times) ===
In July 2024, Kenny‑Smith and Jay Watson released the joint album Ill Times, credited to GUM / Ambrose Kenny‑Smith. The record was the first release on King Gizzard's own p(doom) imprint. Australian public broadcaster Double J reviewed the album as “marking a healthy beginning” for the label. Critics highlighted its groove‑heavy blend of soul, synth‑pop and psych‑rock, and noted the album's lyrical tributes to Kenny‑Smith's late father, including opener “Dud”. The artists also framed the record around themes of loss, grief and resilience.

== Personal life ==
Kenny‑Smith is the son of musician Broderick Smith (1948–2023), frontman of The Dingoes. Smith died on 30 April 2023, and Ambrose paid tribute publicly in the days following. Kenny‑Smith has spoken about experiencing anxiety, and has a cat named Cosmo.

Kenny-Smith married his wife, Tessa, on February 18, 2023, after more than ten years together.

== Discography ==
- Collaborative albums
  - Ill Times (2024) – with GUM (Jay Watson).
