= Joey Walker =

Australian musician and producer

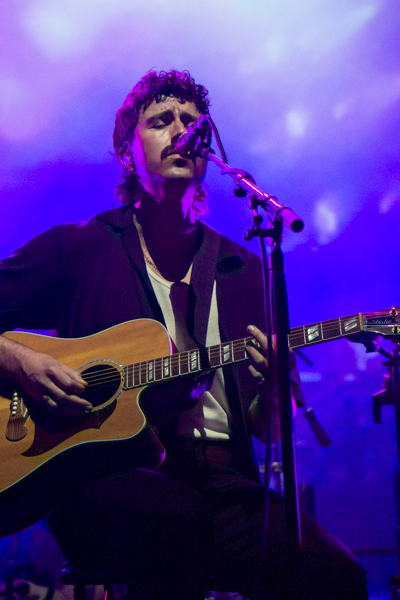
- Walker performing in 2023

Background information
- Born: Joseph William Quinn Walker; 11 October 1988 (age 37); Northern Australia
- Origin: Melbourne, Australia
- Genres: Psychedelic rock; techno; electronic; garage rock
- Instruments: Guitar; vocals; bass guitar; keyboards; synthesizer
- Labels: Flightless; PHC Films; p(doom)
- Member of: King Gizzard & the Lizard Wizard
- Formerly of: Trumpdisco, Love Migrate

Joseph William Quinn Walker (born 11 October 1988) is an Australian musician, singer, and producer who is best known as the lead guitarist for the rock band King Gizzard & the Lizard Wizard. Walker was previously part of the electronic duo Trumpdisco (now SUB-human) and indie rock band Love Migrate. He also releases solo works under the name Bullant.

== Early life and career ==
Walker was born in Northern Australia and raised in the towns of Darwin, Kununurra, and Alice Springs, where he got into local indigenous rock bands such as Yothu Yindi and Warumpi Band when first getting into music. He saw both of these acts perform at the Stompen Ground festival of 1992. He later discovered progressive acts such as Tool as a teenager, leading him to earlier progressive rock bands such as Yes. Walker eventually moved to Melbourne.

While in high school, Walker met Alex Braithwaite who moved to Melbourne from England. Braithwaite introduced Walker to UK drum and bass, inspiring the two to make their own electronic music using a set of turntables Braithwaite had also brought. The pair called themselves Trumpdisco, and began to release music while both in university. They saw quick success with their first track, "Supermassive", a remix of "Supermassive Black Hole" by Muse. The duo saw international airplay on radio and in clubs and were even able to do shows internationally starting with a date in New Zealand in 2009. Walker continued working with Trumpdisco for a number of years, beginning to be less involved around 2013 following the success of King Gizzard before fully leaving the duo around 2016. Alex Braithwaite turned Trumpdisco into a solo project, renaming it to SUB-human.

Walker attended the Royal Melbourne Institute of Technology where he studied for a Bachelor of Arts degree in the music industry. It was in this class that Walker first met Stu Mackenzie and Eric Moore. In 2010, the three of them formed an informal "jam band" which was to become King Gizzard & the Lizard Wizard. Over the course of a few months, they recruited several more members who were mutual friends of the trio. Walker and the rest of the band made much of their work in the class focused around King Gizzard. King Gizzard grew in popularity following the release of their 2nd EP, Willoughby's Beach in 2011 and debut album, 12 Bar Bruise in 2012 on their own independent label Flightless Records.

== Solo career ==
Walker had a long lasting interest in electronic music, previously creating some electronic works for assessments in college and being half of the electronic duo Trumpdisco. Walker released his first solo electronic project in 2014 via SoundCloud, a track titled "Expectant 2". In 2017, Walker began recording solo as Bullant, beginning work on an album in the coming months.

On 13 August 2019, King Gizzard released a game on their website to promote their upcoming album, Infest the Rats' Nest. Hidden within the game was an easter egg teasing the upcoming album, Tyson, Crying, the debut album by Walker as Bullant. On 4 December 2019, Bullant released his debut single in support of the upcoming album, "The Simpsons Suck Now" under Flightless Records. Another single for the album, "XHamster Invoice" was released on 24 January 2020.

Bullant's debut album, Tyson, Crying, was released on 31 January 2020. The album was recorded by Walker in 2018 using "a demo version of Reason and an Ableton crack", stating in a press release "I couldn't save any sessions out which forced me to finish each track on the spot." Matija Zivkovic of X-Press Magazine would give the album a 7/10, stating "Overall, this isn't an essential release but it's also highly listenable, eclectic and fun. With a slightly more pared-back approach and a non-cracked version of Ableton, Bullant could prove a great electronic diversion from the largely guitar-driven Flightless Records stable." Cole Costello of Cosmic Magazine would say "Given his contributions to Gizzard, one might have expected heartfelt lyrics, blazing guitar lines, and magical melodies. Perhaps he's simply saving that kind of material for King Gizzard – a group which, with exception of more left of center excursions like these – his commitment remains total... But whether this kind of music is something fans will see more or none of in future, Joey Walker has already proven himself a musician. Tyson, Crying is trying to show the listener something else to fans, something other than what they already know. What that is may is not up all listeners' alleys, though certain it adds another layer of complexity to Walker's persona."

On 2 July 2020, Bullant released an EP under PHC Films rather than Flightless called German People featuring artwork by Amy Taylor of Amyl and the Sniffers. It was followed up on 10 July by another EP titled Sensitive Crap Opera Bullant's final release of 2020 was a single put out on 16 July titled "Irukandji". On 30 July 2021, Bullant returned to release the single "High Rivals".

In December 2021, King Gizzard announced Butterfly 3001, a remix album of songs from the band's 2021 release Butterfly 3000. Bullant contributed a remix of the song "2.02 Killer Year" to the project, titled "2.02 Killer Year (Bullant's Fuck Mike Love Remix)". The album was released on 21 January 2022.

On 18 January 2023, the PHC Films Instagram account announced an upcoming release from Bullant coming in February 2023. On 17 February 2023, the single "Rove" was released under PHC Films with the b-side "Trade". This was followed up by an EP on 10 March titled U Wunda and a single on 7 April titled "3AW" with the b-side "James Shares A Needle".

On 19 July 2023, Bullant announced his upcoming album, Late Life Circ, with a release date of 1 September. Pre-orders opened the next day alongside the release of the album's first single, "Perfect shelving technique", this was followed by a second single on 3 August titled "Clown From Two Towns Over" and a third on 18 August called "Tiny Bad Boy". Each single featured artwork by Amy Taylor.

== Personal life ==
Walker currently resides in Reservoir, Victoria. It was from his home in Reservoir where many of his parts for King Gizzard albums K.G., L.W., and Butterfly 3000 were recorded.

Joey's sister, Bella Walker, played with him in Love Migrate, and plays in another band: The Bush. Bella Walker has also provided backing vocals on King Gizzard's 2020 track "Minimum Brain Size" and has done color grading on several videos by King Gizzard and The Murlocs.

Walker is in a relationship with Edith Kenny-Smith, former bassist for The Bush and the sister of King Gizzard bandmate Ambrose Kenny-Smith.

== Discography ==
=== Studio albums (as Bullant) ===
List of studio albums with selected details
Title	Details
Tyson, Crying	Released: 31 January 2020; Label: Flightless (FLT-058); Formats: LP, streaming
Late Life Circ	Released: 1 September 2023; Label: PHC Films; Formats: LP, streaming

=== Extended plays (as Bullant) ===
List of EPs with selected details
Title	Details
German People	Released: 2 July 2020; Label: PHC Films; Formats: Digital download, streaming
Sensitive Crap Opera	Released: 10 July 2020; Label: PHC Films; Formats: Digital download, streaming
U Wunda	Released: 10 March 2023; Label: PHC Films; Formats: Streaming

=== Singles (as Bullant) ===
List of singles with selected details
Title	Details	Album
"The Simpsons Suck Now"	Released: 4 December 2019; Label: Flightless; Formats: Streaming	Tyson, Crying
"XHamster Invoice"	Released: 24 January 2020; Label: Flightless; Formats: Streaming	Tyson, Crying
"Irukandji"	Released: 16 July 2020; Label: PHC Films; Formats: Digital download, streaming	—N/a
"High Rivals"	Released: 30 July 2021; Label: PHC Films; Formats: Digital download, streaming	—N/a
"Rove"	Released: 17 February 2023; Label: PHC Films; Formats: Digital download, streaming	—N/a
"3AW"	Released: 7 April 2023; Label: PHC Films; Formats: Streaming	—N/a
"Perfect Shelving Technique"	Released: 20 July 2023; Label: PHC Films; Formats: Streaming	Late Life Circ
"Clown From Two Towns Over"	Released: 3 August 2023; Label: PHC Films; Formats: Streaming	Late Life Circ
"Tiny Bad Boy"	Released: 18 August 2023; Label: PHC Films; Formats: Streaming	Late Life Circ
"My City"	Released: 3 May 2024; Label: PHC Films; Formats: Streaming	—N/a

=== Contributions ===
with King Gizzard & the Lizard Wizard

with Love Migrate

- 2009: Goodnight Owl (EP) (released under the name Goodnight Owl)
- 2010: Red Wolf (Single) (released under the name Goodnight Owl)
- 2010: Plagued Are All My Thoughts, Like White Ants In The Fence
- 2013: Dissolved EP (EP)
- 2015: Shimmer Through The Night (EP)
- 2016: In The Morning (Single)
- 2017: Somewhere, Over The Mangroves

with Trumpdisco

- 2010: Trumpdisco EP (EP)
- 2011: Ov Shark EP (EP)
- 2012: War Horn (Single)
- 2013: Can't Touch Me Now (Single) (with aUtOdiDakT)
- 2014: Third Pt. 1 (EP)
- 2014: Third Pt. 2 (EP)
- 2015: Go To Sleep (Single) (with aUtOdiDakT)

Collaborations

- 2011: Fraser A. Gorman/Forever Son - Lonesome Mother's Son Blues/Come On Back (Single) (production and mixing on Lonesome Mother's Son Blues, credited for mixing as Trump Disco DJs)
- 2014: Dorsal Fins - Gripless (remix on Nothing Left To Hide (King Gizzard Remix), credited as King Gizzard)
- 2014: Rough River - Rough River (guitar on Almost Home)
- 2015: Foreign/National - Always Blue (Single) (recording, mixing)
- 2015: Long Lunch - Long Lunch (EP) (recording, mixing)
- 2015: Foreign/National - The Hedonist (Single) (recording, mixing)
- 2015: Foreign/National - Pacific Cruise (Single) (recording, mixing)
- 2016: Foreign/National - Tristesse (Single) (recording, mixing)
- 2016: Long Lunch - Duo (Single) (recording, mixing)
- 2017: Foreign/National - Dépaysement (recording, mixing)
- 2017: Leah Senior - Pretty Faces (recording, production, therovox)
- 2018: Long Lunch - EP2 (EP) (recording, mixing)
- 2018: Aunty Donna - The Album (guitar on Professor Whiskers)
- 2018: Amyl and the Sniffers - Some Mutts (Can't Be Muzzled) / Cup Of Destiny (Single) (recording)
- 2019: Long Lunch - Tangle (EP) (mixing)
- 2019: Pipe-eye - Inside/Outside (drum recording)
- 2019: Stonefield - Bent (recording)
- 2019: Sledgehammer - Blue Sheila (EP) (recording)
- 2020: The Bush - Purple (Single) (recording)
- 2020: Traffik Island - Sweat Kollecta's Peanut Butter Traffik Jam (production, mixing, remix on Bits & Peace (Bullant Remix), credited as Bullant)
- 2020: The Bush - Ricotta (EP) (mixing, mastering)
- 2020: The Bush - Two Things (Single) (mastering, artwork)
- 2021: Big Yawn - No! Remixes EP (EP) (remix on Skinrat (Bullant Remix), credited as Bullant)
- 2021: CAVS - CAVS (mixing, credited as Bullant)
- 2021: Traffik Island - A Shrug Of The Shoulders (mixing on The Light)
- 2022: King Gizzard & the Lizard Wizard - Butterfly 3001 (remix on 2.02 Killer Year (Bullant's Fuck Mike Love Remix), credited as Bullant)
- 2024: Pipe-eye - Pipe-defy (mixing, intro and outro segments)
