= Live in Chicago '23 =

Live album by King Gizzard & the Lizard Wizard
- Released: 31 August 2023
- Recorded: 11–13 June 2023
- Genre: Psychedelic rock; thrash rock
- Length: 5:40:11
- Label: Self-released; Various
- Producer: Stu Mackenzie

King Gizzard & the Lizard Wizard chronology
Demos Vol. 5 + Vol. 6 (2023)	Live in Chicago '23 (2023)	The Silver Cord (2023)

Live in Chicago '23 is a live album released by Australian rock band King Gizzard and the Lizard Wizard, recorded during their three-night stint at The Salt Shed from 11–13 June 2023 during the band's U.S. Residency Tour. The album was released alongside Demos Vol. 5 + Vol. 6 during a hiatus between albums.

== Recordings ==
A "spiritual sequel" to Live at Red Rocks '22, Live In Chicago '23 consists of nearly six hours of the band's music, ranging from experimental microtone songs to thrash metal. This set also features the first complete performance of the Nonagon Infinity song "Invisible Face," which was the last song from the album to be played fully. The album was released exclusively through the band's Bandcamp as a promotion due to a hiatus before The Silver Cord was released.

== Reception ==
The Merry-go-round Magazine said that the "gem" of the album was the last four songs performed during night one, consisting of The River into Evil Death Roll into Magma into finally Boogieman Sam with Canned Heat's Going Up the Country interpolated into the song. Heavy Pop also gave rave reviews of the day one performance of The River, calling it "Grateful Dead inspired." Night two largely consisted of more psychedelic songs, including the Horology suite, while day three included the then unreleased "Gila Monster" and "Converge" from PetroDragonic Apocalypse.

== Track listing ==
The albums were mastered by Joseph Carra with cover art by Jason Galea.

Live in Chicago '23
No.	Title	Length
1.	"Pleura"	4:45
2.	"O.N.E."	4:21
3.	"Nuclear Fusion"	4:57
4.	"Minimum Brain Size"	5:33
5.	"Gaia"	3:26
6.	"Motor Spirit"	6:15
7.	"The Great Chain of Being"	4:49
8.	"Gaia (cont.)"	2:08
9.	"Witchcraft"	5:59
10.	"Satan Speeds Up"	3:56
11.	"Trapdoor"	5:17
12.	"The River"	24:43
13.	"Evil Death Roll"	13:02
14.	"Magma"	13:49
15.	"Boogieman Sam"	13:35
16.	"Rattlesnake"	11:39
17.	"Honey"	9:08
18.	"Shangai"	12:47
19.	"Hate Dancin'"	3:45
20.	"Astroturf"	8:43
21.	"Down the Sink"	4:31
22.	"Invisible Face"	6:25
23.	"Wah Wah"	7:26
24.	"Road Train"	2:54
25.	"Ice V"	12:01
26.	"Inner Cell"	4:56
27.	"Loyalty"	4:09
28.	"Horology"	2:55
29.	"Supercell"	5:39
30.	"Self-Immolate"	10:31
31.	"Am I in Heaven?"	8:50
32.	"Gila Monster"	4:20
33.	"Converge"	4:04
34.	"Planet B"	4:17
35.	"Mars for the Rich"	4:46
36.	"Plastic Boogie"	3:42
37.	"Hot Water"	10:01
38.	"Hypertension"	15:04
39.	"This Thing"	7:46
40.	"Magenta Mountain"	10:20
41.	"Change"	19:37
42.	"The Garden Goblin"	3:54
43.	"The Dripping Tap"	19:26
Total length:		5:40:11

== Personnel ==
- Stu Mackenzie – vocals, guitar, synthesizers, flute
- Ambrose Kenny-Smith – vocals, harmonica, synthesizers, percussion
- Joey Walker – vocals, guitar, synthesizers
- Cook Craig – vocals, guitar, synthesizers
- Lucas Skinner – bass
- Michael Cavanagh – drums, gong, percussion
