= Demos Vol. 7 + Vol. 8 =

Compilation album by King Gizzard & the Lizard Wizard
- Released: 25 July 2025
- Recorded: 2014–2022
- Genre: Psychedelic rock; garage rock
- Length: 83:47
- Label: Self-released; Various
- Producer: Stu Mackenzie

King Gizzard & the Lizard Wizard chronology
Phantom Island (2025)	Demos Vol. 7 + Vol. 8 (2025)	Alien Metal (2026)

Demos Vol. 7 + Vol. 8 is a compilation album released by King Gizzard & the Lizard Wizard on 25 July 2025, exclusively through Bandcamp. It compiles demos and unreleased tracks ranging from the band's entire career.

== Recording ==
The album was released on 25 July 2025, amidst a tour and the band pulling out of Spotify due to the investment activities of its CEO Daniel Ek. At the time of the album's release, Ek faced significant backlash due to his extensive investment in military technologies, namely the use of AI drones in combat. The album was announced with the message: "New demos collection out everywhere except Spotify (fuck Spotify)."

The album was released as part of the band's bootlegger program, where they release live albums, demos, and even full-length albums, for free without copyright to allow anyone to press their own records. Vol. 7 was recorded between 2014 and 2022 consisting of early demos of songs from Quarters!, Infest the Rats' Nest, and Omnium Gatherum. Vol. 8 meanwhile consisted solely of demos from the album Changes.

== Track listing ==
The album was released on the band's Bandcamp with cover art by Jason Galea, and was mastered by Joseph Carra.

Vol. 7 – Music to Worship Satan To
No.	Title	Length
1.	"Music to Worship Satan To"	4:18
2.	"The River (Demo)"	9:50
3.	"Hell (Demo 1)"	3:09
4.	"Hell (Demo 2)"	2:39
5.	"The Cloud of Dread"	3:32
6.	"Real's Not Real (Demo)"	4:11
7.	"Robocop"	1:45
8.	"Greenhouse Heat Death (Demo)"	5:43
9.	"Donkey Jam"	1:04
10.	"Presumptuous (Demo)"	5:28
11.	"Trailer Park Kid"	2:22
Total length:		44:01

Vol. 8 – Music to Change To
No.	Title	Length
1.	"Music to Change To"	2:28
2.	"Hate Dancin' (Demo)"	3:07
3.	"Change (Demo 1)"	3:29
4.	"No Body (Demo)"	3:36
5.	"Exploding Suns (Demo 1)"	3:24
6.	"Gondii (Demo 1)"	2:05
7.	"Change (Demo 2)"	3:23
8.	"Exploding Suns (Demo 2)"	1:25
9.	"Change (Demo 3)"	3:15
10.	"Gondii (Demo 2)"	3:19
11.	"Exploding Suns (Demo 3)"	4:24
12.	"Astroturf (Demo)"	1:27
13.	"Change (Demo 4)"	4:24
Total length:		39:46
