= Demos Vol. 5 + Vol. 6 =

Compilation album by King Gizzard & the Lizard Wizard
- Released: 31 August 2023
- Recorded: 2011–2022
- Genre: Psychedelic rock; garage rock
- Length: 89:01
- Label: Self-released; Various
- Producer: Stu Mackenzie

King Gizzard & the Lizard Wizard chronology
PetroDragonic Apocalypse (2023)	Demos Vol. 5 + Vol. 6 (2023)	Live In Chicago '23 (2023)

Demos Vol. 5 + Vol. 6 is a compilation album released by King Gizzard & the Lizard Wizard on 31 August 2023, exclusively through Bandcamp and vinyl. It compiles demos and unreleased tracks ranging from the band's entire career. It was originally released as two separate albums (Vol. 5 Music to Think Existentially To and Vol. 6 Music to Burn Money To) but was eventually compiled into one.

== Recordings ==
Both Vol. 5 and Vol. 6 contains demos from Infest the Rats' Nest, Omnium Gatherum, and Willoughby's Beach as well as abandoned concepts that were never turned into full songs. The albums were hinted at being soon to be released as early as 17 July 2022, but were ultimately released on "Bandcamp Friday", 31 August 2023, during a hiatus between albums alongside Live in Chicago '23.

== Track listing ==
Albums were mastered by Joseph Carra with cover art by Jason Galea.

Vol. 5 – Music to Think Existentially To
No.	Title	Length
1.	"Music to Think Existentially To"	4:07
2.	"Lunch Meat (Demo)"	3:11
3.	"Brassicas"	1:39
4.	"Venusian 2 (Demo)"	2:51
5.	"Pleura (Demo 1)"	3:42
6.	"MTV"	0:15
7.	"Honey (Demo 2)"	3:50
8.	"Moses"	1:36
9.	"Ugly Guitars"	3:56
10.	"Vomit Coffin (Demo)"	2:14
11.	"The Hungry Wolf of Fate (Demo 2)"	4:12
12.	"O.N.E. (Demo)"	0:58
13.	"The Dripping Tap (Demo 3)"	10:51
Total length:		43:22

Vol. 6 – Music to Burn Money To
No.	Title	Length
1.	"Music to Burn Money To"	8:46
2.	"You Can Be Your Silhouette (Demo)"	4:46
3.	"Not Enough Time... Land"	1:50
4.	"Invisible Face (Demo)"	2:52
5.	"Blue Horse"	4:37
6.	"Digital Black (Demo)"	3:46
7.	"Lukey's Brain"	0:41
8.	"Self Immolate (Demo)"	3:47
9.	"Marble"	1:52
10.	"Pleura (Demo 2)"	2:56
11.	"Sweet Talking"	3:29
12.	"All Is Known (Demo 2)"	4:45
13.	"The Dripping Tap (Demo 4)"	1:32
Total length:		45:39
