= Rogue wave (disambiguation) =

A rogue wave is an abnormally large ocean wave.

Rogue wave may also refer to:

- Optical rogue waves, are rare pulses of light analogous to rogue or freak ocean waves.
- Rogue Wave Software, a software company
- Rogue Wave (band), an American indie rock band
- "Rogue Wave", a song by Australian rock band King Gizzard & the Lizard Wizard
- "Rogue Wave", a song by American progressive rock band The Hsu-nami
- ”Rogue Wave”, a song by American rapper and producer Aesop Rock
- “Rogue Wave”, a short story by Theodore Taylor (author)
