= Cyboogie =

Single by King Gizzard & the Lizard Wizard

from the album Fishing for Fishies
- B-side: "Acarine"
- Released: 1 February 2019
- Studio: TFS Studios; Flightless HQ
- Length: 6:48
- Label: Flightless
- Songwriter: Stu Mackenzie

King Gizzard & the Lizard Wizard singles chronology
"Rolling Stoned" (2018)	"Cyboogie" / "Acarine" (2019)	"Fishing for Fishies" (2019)

Music video
- "Cyboogie" on YouTube

"Cyboogie" is a song by Australian-psychedelic rock band King Gizzard & the Lizard Wizard, first released on 1 February 2019 as the lead single in promotion of the bands fourteenth studio album Fishing for Fishies. Upon release, it ended the longest break between new music in the bands history, with the previous record coming out on 31 December 2017. The track was released as on seven inch vinyl backed with "Acarine", also from Fishing for Fishies via Flightless.

== Release ==
Upon the tracks release, the album it was released on, Fishing for Fishies, had yet to be released, though a press release stated that "Cyboogie" is "an addictive taste of what’s to come from the band". The record would be announced on 11 March 2019 alongside the title-track as the second single.

== Composition ==
The track has been described as a "seven-minute monster stomp", built on a "titanic glam-shuffle beat", full of "sci-fi keyboard noises and bugged-out vocodered vocals", "cool riffs", "layered percussion", and "plenty of whammy bar". It has also been described as not fitting in any genre, being called "hammerhead electro-prog".

According to the liner notes, Han-Tyumi, the protagonist of the track "Han-Tyumi and the Murder of the Universe" from Murder of the Universe, has vocals on this track. These can be heard by playing the track backwards.

== Music video ==
A video was released alongside the track, it was directed by longtime album cover designer Jason Galea. The video features the band shot on grainy lo-fi film performing in a "mad scientists lair", wearing "absurd" uniforms and "tweaking-ominous looking knobs", furthermore, it has been stated that the band is flanking front-man Stu Mackenzie playing the keyboard, "working away at myriad other keys, knobs, and wires". The video has been described as "kooky" and having unusual shots.

== Personnel ==
Credits for Fishing for Fishies adapted from liner notes.

- Stu Mackenzie – vocals, keyboards, synthesizer
- Ambrose Kenny-Smith – keyboards
- Joey Walker – synthesizer
- Cook Craig – synthesizer
- Michael Cavanagh – drums
- Lucas Skinner – synthesizer
- Han-Tyumi – vocals
