= Alien Metal (song) =

2026 single by King Gizzard & the Lizard Wizard

Single by King Gizzard & the Lizard Wizard

from the album Alien Metal
- Released: 28 July 2026
- Genre: Techno; dark electro
- Length: 5:08
- Label: P(doom)
- Songwriters: Joey Walker; Stu Mackenzie

King Gizzard & the Lizard Wizard singles chronology
"Level 5" (2026)	"Alien Metal" (2026)	"Kill For The Steel" (2026)

Visualizer
- "Alien Metal" on YouTube

"Alien Metal" is the second single and title track from the album Alien Metal by the rock band King Gizzard & the Lizard Wizard. It was a surprise release.

== Background ==
The song was built on the band’s custom built modular synth, being written and recorded entirely on the modular synth set-up, named "Nathan".

== Reception ==
Stereogum raved about the track saying "Much like "Level 5", King Gizzard's new track is an extremely fun piece of brain-busting early-'90s techno catharsis with some of the wiggy melodic choices that only this group would've made", before also stating "Both of King Gizzard's new singles could've worked as soundtracks for nightclub shootouts in B-level '90s action movies, and I mean that as the highest compliment". Consequence of Sound had similar comments to Stereogum, stating the song was "a five minute kaleidoscopic trip through crunchy techno with ethereal vocals and synasthesia-inducing melodies". "Alien Metal is a pummeling techno concoction that could perfectly soundtrack the next Blade film" said The Note in their publication about the track's release.

Glide Magazine described the song as a "full-on electronic smasher" that comes from "the dark heart of electronic dance music". Line of Best Fit similarly stated that the song "delves deeper into their exploration of darker electronic music". Blunt Magazine described the song as "another glimpse into what promises to be one of the band’s boldest releases yet".
