= Kill for the Steel =

2026 single by King Gizzard & the Lizard Wizard

Single by King Gizzard & the Lizard Wizard

from the album Alien Metal
- Released: 11 August 2026
- Genre: Industrial techno; dark electronic
- Length: 3:52
- Label: P(doom)
- Songwriters: Joey Walker; Stu Mackenzie

King Gizzard & the Lizard Wizard singles chronology
"Alien Metal" (2026)	"Kill for the Steel" (2026)	"Flower in a Hurricane" (2026)

Visualizer
- "Kill for the Steel" on YouTube

"Kill for the Steel" is the third single from the album Alien Metal by the rock band King Gizzard & the Lizard Wizard. It was a surprise release.

== Composition ==
"Kill for the Steel" has been described as a dark electronic and industrial techno track. The end of the track flows into the next track on the album (and its first single), "Level 5".

== Reception ==
Consequence of Sound described the song as industrial techno. The writer, Alex Krinsky, said the track featured "pounding rhythms, heavy low-end, and processed electronic vocals". The song was described as "dark take on electronic music combining the band’s recent forays into metal and modular synth excurcisons" by Glide Magazine.
