= Laminated Denim =

Studio album by King Gizzard & the Lizard Wizard
- Released: 12 October 2022
- Genre: Psychedelic rock; progressive rock; krautrock; jam band
- Length: 30:00
- Label: KGLW

King Gizzard & the Lizard Wizard chronology
Ice, Death, Planets, Lungs, Mushrooms and Lava (2022)	Laminated Denim (2022)	Changes (2022)

Laminated Denim is the twenty-second studio album by Australian psychedelic rock band King Gizzard & the Lizard Wizard, released on 12 October 2022, five days after their previous album, Ice, Death, Planets, Lungs, Mushrooms and Lava.

The album's title is an anagram of the title of the band’s 19th album, Made in Timeland, whose digital release coincided with the release of Laminated Denim. Described by the band as a "spiritual successor" to Made in Timeland, Laminated Denim features two 15-minute songs written around the ticking of a clock, but featuring more rock-focused instrumentals with heavy use of polyrhythms and a Motorik beat. Its psychedelic and progressive rock sound differs from the electronic-based Timeland.

== Background and recording ==
On 18 June 2022, the band posted a tweet promising three more albums by the end of 2022. More details came on 12 July, when it was reported that the first two of these were "built from all six members jamming for hours," similarly to the recording process of "The Dripping Tap" from Omnium Gatherum.

On 7 September, the band revealed the titles, cover artwork, and release dates for their next three albums: Ice, Death, Planets, Lungs, Mushrooms, and Lava would be released on 7 October; Laminated Denim on 12 October; and Changes on 28 October.

Laminated Denim was the first album finished of the three records the band released in October. After the recording sessions for "The Dripping Tap," the band continued to record together again, spending more in the studio to jam. Following the positive experience recording this album, the band decided to continue working in this way, recording the preceding album Ice, Death, Planets, Lungs, Mushrooms, and Lava.

Lead vocalist and multi-instrumentalist Stu Mackenzie noted that the two songs on Laminated Denim are among his favorites: "Sometimes the boundaries you set for yourself kind of force you into a creative place that you wouldn't have usually gone to or been comfortable with".

== Release ==
In anticipation of the album's release, it was revealed that copies of Laminated Denim would be available on their show at Red Rocks on 10 October 2022, two days ahead of the album's official release. The first track was premiered in the intermission between the two sets of the 10 October show, while the second track was premiered on the second night on 11 October.

== Reception ==
Professional ratings
Review scores
Source	Rating
AllMusic	3/5 stars
The Fire Note	4/5 stars
Pitchfork	7.5/10
Prog Archives	3.64/5 stars
Uncut	7/10

In the review for AllMusic, Tim Sendra described the album as being, "perfect for taking up time until the stars of the show return to the stage. Does it make for good home listening? Is it King Gizzard at their best? yes, and not exactly. It certainly slots in a level below their more considered releases, but if one is fully onboard with the King Gizzard experience, Laminated Denim is certainly worth adding to an ever expanding-collection of works."

Writing for The Fire Note, Simon Workman claimed that "The music slowly blossoms as each track unfolds, layers of guitars and keyboards weaving melodic lines beneath Stu Mackenzie’s familiar falsetto. While Ice, Death, Planets, Lungs, Mushrooms, and Lava felt proggy, jazzy, and funky at times, Laminated Denim’s jams are more psychedelic, with Michael Cavanaugh’s motorik krautrock beat anchoring the rest of the band’s explorations."

== Track listing ==
All tracks are written by Stu Mackenzie, Michael Cavanagh, Cook Craig, Ambrose Kenny-Smith, Joey Walker.

Laminated Denim track listing
No.	Title	Length
1.	"The Land Before Timeland"	15:00
2.	"Hypertension"	15:00
Total length:		30:00

== Personnel ==
King Gizzard & the Lizard Wizard

- Ambrose Kenny-Smith – keyboards, percussion, vocals (all tracks), harmonica (track 1)
- Michael Cavanagh – drums, percussion (all tracks)
- Cook Craig – guitar (all tracks), bass (track 1)
- Joey Walker – guitar, bass, synthesizer (all tracks)
- Lucas Harwood – keyboards (track 1)
- Stu Mackenzie – vocals, guitar, keyboards, percussion (all tracks), synthesizer (track 1), bass, flute (track 2)

Production

- Stu Mackenzie – recording, production, mixing
- Joseph Carra – mastering
- Jason Galea – artwork

== Charts ==
Chart performance for Laminated Denim
Chart (2022–2025)	Peak position
Australian Albums (ARIA)	11
UK Rock & Metal Albums (OCC)	33
US Top Album Sales (Billboard)	93
