= Rogue Wave (song) =

2026 single by King Gizzard & the Lizard Wizard

Single by King Gizzard & the Lizard Wizard

from the album Entropy
- Released: 10 November 2026
- Length: 5:36
- Label: P(doom)

King Gizzard & the Lizard Wizard singles chronology
"Flower in a Hurricane" (2026)	"Rogue Wave" (2026)

"Rogue Wave" is the lead single from the album Entropy by the rock band King Gizzard & the Lizard Wizard. It was surprise released alongside the announcement of the album and a 2027 tour in North America.

== Reception ==
Consequence of Sound said the song "highlights the bouncier, more upbeat feel of Entropy through the band's distinct techno-side psychedelia". Spin said the song was "perhaps the most danceable and seemingly posi-vibes song ever written about a tsunami" and a "nice nod back" to the sound of Butterfly 3000 (2021).
