= Level 5 (King Gizzard & the Lizard Wizard song) =

2026 single by King Gizzard & the Lizard Wizard

Single by King Gizzard & the Lizard Wizard

from the album Alien Metal
- Released: 8 July 2026
- Genre: Breakbeat; breakbeat hardcore; techno
- Length: 5:35
- Label: P(doom)
- Songwriters: Joey Walker; Stu Mackenzie

King Gizzard & the Lizard Wizard singles chronology
"Grow Wings and Fly" (2025)	"Level 5" (2026)	"Alien Metal" (2026)

Music video
- "Level 5" on YouTube

"Level 5" is the lead single from the album Alien Metal by the rock band King Gizzard & the Lizard Wizard. It was a surprise release alongside the announcement of the album.

== Background ==
The title and lyrics refer to the highest level of automation in a self-driving car.

== Reception ==
BrooklynVegan stated "Level 5 runs on a breakbeat engine and vocoders. It's in Prodigy territory while still somehow sounding like King Gizzard". Happy Magazine called the song "frantic" and described it as "a mechanical menagerie of sequenced sounds and distorted vocals that fuses hardcore, house, and jungle into their unmistakably trippy lens". Consequence of Sound called the song "a trippy amalgamation of sequenced sounds, frenetic rhythms, and mechanical melodies with hints of humanity in distorted vocals and synthetic string instruments that fuse into an otherworldly techno tune". Louder Than War said "If this doesn’t get you dancing, nothing will move you". The Note called the song "a combustible bomb of dark electronica" and a "hard-hitting techno beast". Knotfest described it as "Equal parts sci-fi odyssey and otherworldly soundtrack" and said, "the cut marks the start of King Gizzard's next and arguably most audacious era". The Australian Broadcasting Corporation stated "With some serious bleep bloops, dance moves and a smattering of surgical gore, ‘Level 5’ serves. We’d expect nothing less. Up the Gizz".

== Music video ==
A music video was released alongside the song, directed by Australian director Hayden Somerville and featuring a cameo by Australian actor Vince Colosimo. The plot follows a cult of red-clad space scientists cutting open an unsuspecting naked and wrinkly being who is laying on an operating table as they strive to bring it back to life through the power of techno. Colosimo plays a surgeon, while Jayden Wall plays an alien figure and Jacqui Sundbery as the ritual leader. The music video also features an extended instrumental intro incorporating the end of the preceding track on the album (and the third single) "Kill For The Steel", expanding the track to 6:17.

Ruby Thomas, the producer of the video, stated "Hayden had brought up Vince on numerous occasions when fantasizing about casting for previous projects, but I had mostly laughed it off because it seemed impossible. On this occasion it didn’t feel like such a crazy idea. We really wanted to find a strong, recognizable face to lead this clip, and in Australian cinema, Vince is all that and more".

The video was positively received by the Australian Broadcasting Corporation stating "The clip looks like the missing rave scene from a Dune film, albeit with a little more scientific experimentation".
