= Made in Timeland =

Album by King Gizzard & the Lizard Wizard

Studio album by King Gizzard & the Lizard Wizard
- Released: 5 March 2022
- Genres: Acid techno; neo-psychedelia; acid house; IDM; electronica; avant-garde; trance
- Length: 30:00
- Labels: Flightless; ATO; self-released
- Producer: Stu Mackenzie

King Gizzard & the Lizard Wizard chronology
Butterfly 3000 (2021)	Made in Timeland (2022)	Omnium Gatherum (2022)

Full chronology
Live in Brisbane '21 (2022)	Made in Timeland (2022)	Satanic Slumber Party (2022)

Made in Timeland is the nineteenth studio album by Australian psychedelic rock band King Gizzard & the Lizard Wizard, released on 5 March 2022 on Flightless in Australia, ATO in the U.S., and self-released in Europe. Produced by Stu Mackenzie, the album consists of two fifteen-minute-long tracks, each taking one side of the record.

The album was originally planned to be an exclusive vinyl-only release, given to the attendees of the band's Timeland Festival on 31 December 2021. The festival was ultimately cancelled and the album was instead given a full physical release in March 2022, with digital versions becoming available on 11 October 2022.

The band's 22nd album, Laminated Denim, released later in 2022, features an anagram of Made in Timeland as its title, and is described by the band as a "spiritual successor" to the album - and was released the day after Made in Timeland's digital release.

== Background and recording ==
The album consists of two 15 minute long tracks, each taking one side of the record. Both tracks consist of several short sections and feature a consistent clicking sound at a tempo of 60 BPM (much like a clock ticking), which carries on through the album. The album began production as intermission music for King Gizzard's three-hour marathon live shows, originally scheduled to be played in mid-2020. Eventually, frontman Stu Mackenzie decided it would be fun to expand the project into a full album. The recording process was done via a series of vignettes, each individually created and recorded by one member of the band. These vignettes were then later presented to the band as a whole for additional expansion and overdubs, with Mackenzie then responsible for taking all of these original ideas and combining them together into one overall piece.

On 29 April and 30 November 2020, the band did two AMAs on Reddit. The username used for both was MadeInTimeland. During the November AMA, when asked about an idea they had that never panned out, Lucas Harwood answered "Timeland".

On 23 November 2021, the proposed Timeland festival was announced. A New Year's Eve festival, the two-night event was due to be held at Our Friend's Farm in Tallarook, between 31 December and 2 January. On 17 December, the band teased the release of their 19th full-length album, Made in Timeland, which was expected to be available at the festival. However, on 30 December, the day it was scheduled, the festival was cancelled, citing COVID-19 concerns.

In February 2022, in an interview with band member Ambrose Kenny-Smith on the podcast The Vinyl Guide, he confirmed that the album had already been pressed, and copies of it had been sent prematurely to record stores in various places. The 60 BPM ticking motif is followed up in the final track, "The Funeral", of the band's twentieth album Omnium Gatherum (April 2022). A sequel, titled Laminated Denim, was released on the 12th of October.

== Release ==
The record was intended to be a give-away at the Timeland festival on New Year's Eve, but that festival's last-minute cancellation scrapped that plan. Beginning in January 2022, vinyl copies of Made in Timeland were prematurely released to the public. Record stores in Sweden, Finland, and Spain made the album available to the public. In the following weeks, it was leaked via vinyl recordings onto the internet, where many fans heard it for the first time.

In February 2022, the band announced a three-hour marathon set in Melbourne, naming the one-off show as Return of the Curse of Timeland, set to take place on 5 March. The album was for sale at the show, and later made available on the band's website as a vinyl-only release. On 11 October 2022, Made In Timeland was added to various streaming services like YouTube and Apple Music.

== Reception ==
Mike Bringman of Still Listening felt Made in Timeland is "a silly release that does little to add to the body of work that the band has worked so hard to develop." Nevertheless, the album breaks down, "the wall of expected overachievement" but it is "probably not going to bring in new listeners to the band or even impress listeners of EDM, house, trance or other experimental genres." "Smoke & Mirrors" was played during their European Residency Tour in Plovdiv on June 9, 2025, while "Timeland" has yet to have a live debut.

== Track listing ==
Made in Timeland track listing
No.	Title	Writer(s)	Length
1.	"Timeland"	Michael Cavanagh; Cook Craig; Stu Mackenzie; Joey Walker	15:00
2.	"Smoke & Mirrors"	Cavanagh; Lucas Harwood; Ambrose Kenny-Smith; Mackenzie; Walker	15:00
Total length:			30:00

== Personnel ==
1.Timeland

- Stu Mackenzie – vocals, bass guitar, keyboards, synthesiser, percussion, mellotron, drums, ocarina
- Joey Walker – synthesiser, percussion
- Michael Cavanagh – drums, percussion
- Ambrose Kenny-Smith – vocals
- Cook Craig – keyboards, synthesiser

2.Smoke and Mirrors

- Stu Mackenzie – vocals, bass guitar, keyboards, synthesiser, percussion, mellotron, vocoder
- Joey Walker – synthesiser, percussion
- Michael Cavanagh – drums, percussion, synthesiser
- Ambrose Kenny-Smith – vocals, synthesiser, acoustic guitar, percussion, keyboards
- Lucas Harwood – keyboards, synthesiser, bass, fretless bass

Production

- Stu Mackenzie – production, mixing
- Joey Walker – mixing
- Joseph Carra – mastering
- Jason Galea – artwork

== Charts ==
Chart performance for Made in Timeland
Chart (2022)	Peak position
Australian Albums (ARIA)	65
Scottish Albums (Official Charts)	39
UK Independent Albums (Official Charts)	16
US Top Album Sales (Billboard)	43
