= Alien Metal =

Studio album by King Gizzard & the Lizard Wizard
- Released: 14 August 2026
- Genres: Techno; breakbeat hardcore; house; jungle
- Length: 40:55
- Label: p(doom)

King Gizzard & the Lizard Wizard chronology
Demos Vol. 7 + Vol. 8 (2025)	Alien Metal (2026)	Entropy (2026)

Singles from Alien Metal
- 1. "Level 5" Released: 8 July 2026; 2. "Alien Metal" Released: 28 July 2026; 3. "Kill for the Steel" Released: 11 August 2026

Alien Metal is the twenty-eighth studio album by Australian rock band King Gizzard & the Lizard Wizard, released on 14 August 2026 through p(doom) Records. The album was preceded by the singles "Level 5", "Alien Metal" and "Kill for the Steel". The album was surprise-released on 14 August with no prior release date announcement from the band.

The album was recorded alongside the band's subsequent release Entropy, with the two having been intended to release simultaneously. However, Entropy was delayed and instead released in December 2026.

== Background ==
Alien Metal was announced on 8 July 2026, alongside the release of the lead single "Level 5" and its music video starring Vince Colosimo.

== Composition ==
In 2023, the band released The Silver Cord, an electronic album that was followed by an increasing emphasis on introducing electronic material into their live shows through the use of a modular synth rig named "Nathan". Alien Metal was written over these years as the band grew increasingly familiar with electronic music, with Stu Mackenzie noting that the band scrapped multiple hours of demos over that time—more than any prior album: "Entire albums, entire universes that were formulated, created, recorded, deleted and started again." Alien Metal came 14 months after the band's previous studio effort Phantom Island (2025), longer than usual between studio albums for the prolific band, as they deliberately wanted to take their time.

King Gizzard took a DIY approach to recording Alien Metal by modifying the Eurorack synthesizers themselves to build the sound profile they wanted. Mackenzie recalled that working with synthesizers for the album "completely rewired my brain". The band spent a week in mid-2025 recording for the album before their rave tour in which they played only electronic material. Although the band did the 2025 rave tour, they wrote Alien Metal to sound distinct rather than try to replicate that live experience. The band's drummer Michael Cavanagh also credited Joey Walker's solo career as "Bullant" as a large help with learning how to work with electronic instruments. Mackenzie continued to experiment with electronic music, releasing a solo album Mango Sticky Rice through the band's Bootlegger program in December 2025, consisting of an hour and a half of ambient generative music. In June 2026, he played a handful of solo shows with his synth rig at a cafe in Melbourne.

The album's primary themes came to be in a one-hour improvisational session with the band in the key of F♯. Much like the band's eighth album Nonagon Infinity, every single track on the album flows into the next, with the last flowing into the first, allowing it to play on an infinite loop.

== Promotion ==
Professional ratings
Review scores
Source	Rating
The Arts Desk	4/5 stars
Pitchfork	7.0/10

On 7 July 2026, the band added a show to their tour, a rave show at Under the K Bridge Park in Brooklyn, New York, to promote the album. The album was released on 14 August 2026 with no prior announcement, to coincide with the start of their self-hosted "Field of Vision" festival in Buena Vista, Colorado.

== Track listing ==
All tracks are written by Ambrose Kenny-Smith, Stu Mackenzie, and Joey Walker.

Alien Metal track listing
No.	Title	Length
1.	"Sapience"	4:41
2.	"Alien Metal"	5:08
3.	"Superheavy, Supercritical"	6:23
4.	"Kill for the Steel"	3:52
5.	"Level 5"	5:35
6.	"Rapid Alpha Decay"	4:31
7.	"Uqt"	4:16
8.	"Atomic Collapse"	6:29
Total length:		40:55

== Personnel ==
- Stu Mackenzie
- Joey Walker
- Cook Craig
- Ambrose Kenny-Smith
- Lucas Harwood
- Michael Cavanagh
- Joe Carra – mastering
- Jason Galea – artwork, design, photography
- Maclay Heriot – photography

== Charts ==
Chart performance for Alien Metal
Chart (2026)	Peak position
Australian Albums (ARIA)	26
UK Album Downloads (Official Charts)	60
US Top Album Sales (Billboard)	30
