= Flower in a Hurricane =

2026 single by Justice

Single by Justice featuring Tame Impala, SZA, and King Gizzard & the Lizard Wizard

from the album Grand Theft Auto VI: Original Score and Grand Theft Auto VI: The Album
- Released: 15 October 2026
- Genre: Electronic; alternative
- Length: 3:45
- Label: Ed Banger; Because; Take-Two Interactive
- Songwriters: Ambrose Kenny-Smith; Gaspard Augé; Joey Walker; Kevin Parker; Lucas Harwood; Michael Cavanagh; Nicholas Craig; Sarah Aarons; Solana Rowe; Stu Mackenzie; Xavier de Rosnay
- Producers: Justice; Kevin Parker

Justice singles chronology
"What You Want" (2026)	"Flower in a Hurricane" (2026)	"Pusher" (2026)

Tame Impala singles chronology
"Hummer" (2026)	"Flower in a Hurricane" (2026)

SZA singles chronology
"Boy in Red" (2026)	"Flower in a Hurricane" (2026)

King Gizzard & the Lizard Wizard singles chronology
"Kill for the Steel" (2026)	"Flower in a Hurricane" (2026)	"Rogue Wave" (2026)

Audio video
- "Flower In a Hurricane" on YouTube

"Flower in a Hurricane" is a song by the French electronic music duo Justice. The song features the American singer-songwriter SZA, the Australian musical project Tame Impala, and the Australian rock band King Gizzard & the Lizard Wizard. It was released on 15 October 2026 as the ninth single from Grand Theft Auto VI: The Album and the first single from Grand Theft Auto VI: Original Score, the official soundtrack and score albums for the video game Grand Theft Auto VI.

The song serves as the game's theme song. "Flower in a Hurricane" became King Gizzard & the Lizard Wizard's first entry on the Billboard Hot 100 and their first top 40 hit on the UK Singles Chart. "Flower in a Hurricane" also became Justice's first top-10 hit in the UK, surpassing the number 20 peak of "We Are Your Friends" from 2006.

== Background and release ==
Justice and Tame Impala previously collaborated on the songs "Neverender", which won the 2025 Grammy Award for Best Dance/Electronic Recording, and "One Night/All Night", both from Justice's fourth studio album Hyperdrama. On 15 October 2026, the launch trailer for Grand Theft Auto VI, featuring the song, was released. This coincided with both the announcement that Justice composed the original score for the game, as well as the immediate release of the single on streaming platforms. Justice's music had previously appeared in two entries in the series: "Waters of Nazareth" in Grand Theft Auto IV; and "Stress" in Grand Theft Auto Online, both originally from their debut studio album Cross.

== Composition ==
"Flower in a Hurricane" was written in the key of C♯ minor. Multiple critics noted similarities between the song's "atmospheric synth intro and chugging [guitar] riff" and songs like "Money for Nothing" by Dire Straits or "Got Me Under Pressure" by ZZ Top. Around 2024, Justice contacted King Gizzard to provide some rock jams for use in the soundtrack. The band responded by providing six jams described by Stu Mackenzie as sounding akin to T. Rex, featuring harmonica, hand percussion, and piano. These were then used by Justice, alongside a swath of other features, to create the final tracks.

== Critical reception ==
Mark Kennedy, writing for the Associated Press, praised "Flower in a Hurricane", noting that it "begins with a thick, ominous slice of synth and blossoms into a Dire Straits-meet-ZZ Top style rocker", while complimenting its "high and airy" vocals and late-1980s aesthetic in which SZA delivers "her best Scorpions impression". Echoing the sentiment, Maura Johnston of Rolling Stone commended the "genre-splicing" team-up among Justice, SZA, King Gizzard & the Lizard Wizard, and Tame Impala, citing it as evidence that the soundtrack succeeds as a "solid listen" when paying homage to the 1980s.

== Personnel ==
Credits adapted from Tidal.

=== Performance and production ===
- Gaspard Augé – producer, composer, lyricist, sound engineer
- Xavier de Rosnay – producer, composer, lyricist, sound engineer
- Kevin Parker – producer, composer, lyricist, guitar, vocals, sound engineer
- Joey Walker – composer, featured artist, lyricist
- Ambrose Kenny-Smith – composer, featured artist, lyricist
- Lucas Harwood – composer, featured artist, lyricist
- Michael Cavanagh – composer, featured artist, lyricist
- Nicholas Craig – composer, featured artist, lyricist
- Sarah Aarons – composer, lyricist
- Solana Rowe – composer, lyricist, vocals
- Stu Mackenzie – composer, featured artist, lyricist

=== Technical ===
- Matt Colton – mastering engineer
- Eric J. Dubowsky – mixing engineer
- Mendy Stein – mix assistant
- Hector Castro – sound engineer

== Charts ==
Chart performance for "Flower in a Hurricane"
Chart (2026)	Peak position
Australia (ARIA)	17
Australia Airplay (RCS)	20
Austria (Ö3 Austria Top 40)	17
Belgium (Ultratop 50 Flanders)	28
Canada Hot 100 (Billboard)	42
Canada Modern Rock (Billboard Canada)	19
Canada Rock (Billboard)	39
CIS Airplay (TopHit)	54
Estonia Airplay (TopHit)	31
France (SNEP)	50
France Airplay (SNEP)	29
Germany (GfK)	7
Germany Airplay (MusicTrace)	56
Global 200 (Billboard)	52
Greece International (IFPI)	56
Ireland (IRMA)	16
Italy (FIMI)	57
Italy Airplay (EarOne)	42
Kazakhstan Airplay (TopHit)	154
Latvia Airplay (LaIPA)	17
Latvia Streaming (LaIPA)	19
Lithuania (AGATA)	7
Lithuania Airplay (TopHit)	10
Malta Airplay (Radiomonitor)	17
Netherlands (Dutch Top 40)	17
Netherlands (Single Top 100)	18
New Zealand (Recorded Music NZ)	27
Norway (IFPI Norge)	33
Poland Airplay (OLiS)	13
Poland Streaming (OLiS)	94
Russia Airplay (TopHit)	103
Serbia Airplay (Radiomonitor)	19
Sweden (Sverigetopplistan)	43
Switzerland (Schweizer Hitparade)	5
Switzerland Airplay (MusicTrace)	36
Turkey International Airplay (Radiomonitor Türkiye)	7
UK Singles (Official Charts)	9
US Billboard Hot 100	62
US Hot Dance/Electronic Songs (Billboard)	2
US Hot Rock & Alternative Songs (Billboard)	17
US Rock & Alternative Airplay (Billboard)	4
