= Changes (King Gizzard & the Lizard Wizard album) =

Studio album by King Gizzard & the Lizard Wizard
- Released: 28 October 2022
- Recorded: 2017–2022
- Genre: Psychedelic pop; progressive pop; synth-pop; R&B; jazz-rock; psychedelic soul
- Length: 40:01
- Label: KGLW
- Producer: Stu Mackenzie

King Gizzard & the Lizard Wizard chronology
Laminated Denim (2022)	Changes (2022)	PetroDragonic Apocalypse (2023)

Full chronology
Laminated Denim (2022)	Changes (2022)	Live at Red Rocks '22 (2023)

Singles from Changes
- 1. "Hate Dancin'" Released: 17 October 2022; 2. "No Body" / "Exploding Suns" Released: 3 March 2023

Changes is the twenty-third studio album by Australian psychedelic rock band King Gizzard & the Lizard Wizard, released on 28 October 2022. It is the third album the band released during October 2022 and fifth and final album to be released overall during the year.

== Background and recording ==
On 18 June 2022, the band posted a tweet promising three more albums by the end of 2022. More details came on 12 July, when it was reported that the last album was "something Gizzard has been working on since 2017 – the longest amount of time the band has ever spent on a single record." Mackenzie stated that "There isn't a jamming vibe on it. It's super considered, for a Gizz record. Every overdub and every part is important", and described the record as "more of a song cycle".

The album was first conceived in 2017. That same year, the band released five studio albums. Changes was supposed to be the final one, however the band didn't think the album was finished, and instead released Gumboot Soup. The eventual release of the album contains "Exploding Suns" as it was recorded back in 2017.

As stated by band member Stu Mackenzie: "Every song is built around this one chord progression – every track is like a variation on a theme." The band had been "tinkering with" Changes since then, calling the album "not necessarily our most complex record, but every little piece and each sound you hear has been thought about a lot."

The overall sound of the album was described as "soaked in the warm sonics of 70s R'n'B and guided by simple chord-changes that contain multitudes". It was also noted that the first letter of each song title on Changes spells out the album's title.

Changes was originally going to be one long song. That became the album's 13-minute opening track "Change", which was described as an "odyssey touching on kaleidoscopic '60s pop, color-splattered prog-rock fireworks, and floaty, keyboard-driven retro R&B". Mackenzie described the following songs as building out of the first track: "'Hate Dancin'' is built out of one of the chord progressions from 'Change'. And then 'Astroturf' is built out of one of the chord progressions in "Change" as well. And so is 'Short Change', the last song. Every song on the album is built out of a section of 'Change.'

== Release ==
On 7 September, it was revealed that copies of the album will be available at the band's show at the Orpheum in New Orleans, on 27 October, a day ahead of the album's release date.

A music video for the first single "Hate Dancin'", directed by John Angus Stuart, was released on 17 October.

The album was released on 28 October.

== Critical reception ==
Professional ratings
Review scores
Source	Rating
AllMusic	3.5/5 stars
Louder Than War	4/5 stars
Pitchfork	7.2/10
Uncut	8/10

In the review for AllMusic, Tim Sendra described that albums as being, "weird and familiar at once, like exploring the moon from the safety of your own couch." and claimed that, "King Gizzard are never less than compelling, and even when their concepts are modest, they deliver a final product that's psychedelic pop/rock/funk/soul/prog/what have you at its very best." Louder Than War's Wayne Carey also drew comparisons to other releases in the band's oeuvre, claiming that, "King Gizz continue to surprise with each release. Three albums in a month including Ice, Death, Planets, Lungs, Mushrooms and Lava, Laminated Denim and now Changes. I could only review one and I think this album speaks for them all. An absolute treasure on the music scene and not a bad release yet as far as I'm concerned. A stunning collection of work that continues to surprise."

Reviewing the album for Uncut, Maclay Heriot stated that, "Changes underscores its makers' commitment to evolution".

== Track listing ==
Vinyl releases have tracks 1–2 on side A, and 3–7 on side B.

Changes track listing
No.	Title	Writer(s)	Length
1.	"Change"	Stu Mackenzie; Ambrose Kenny-Smith; Joey Walker; Cook Craig	13:03
2.	"Hate Dancin'"	Mackenzie; Kenny-Smith	3:16
3.	"Astroturf"	Mackenzie; Michael Cavanagh	7:33
4.	"No Body"	Mackenzie	3:42
5.	"Gondii"	Mackenzie	4:57
6.	"Exploding Suns"	Mackenzie; Kenny-Smith	4:40
7.	"Short Change"	Mackenzie	2:50
Total length:			40:01

== Personnel ==
King Gizzard & the Lizard Wizard

- Stu Mackenzie – vocals, Wurlitzer, synthesiser (all tracks), drums, vibraphone (track 1), guitar (tracks 1, 2, 4, 7), bass guitar (tracks 1–4, 6, 7), Mellotron, keyboards (tracks 1, 3, 7), organ (tracks 1–3), flute (track 3), percussion (track 5), acoustic guitar (track 6)
- Michael Cavanagh – drums (all tracks)
- Ambrose Kenny-Smith – percussion (all tracks), vocals (tracks 1–6), keyboards (tracks 1, 3, 4), saxophone (track 3)
- Cook Craig – synthesiser (tracks 1, 5, 6), keyboard, vocals, guitar (track 1), bass guitar (track 6)
- Joey Walker – synthesiser (tracks 1–3, 5), guitar (tracks 1, 3), vocals (track 1)

Production

- Stu Mackenzie – recording (tracks 1–5, 7), mixing, production
- Nico Wilson – recording (track 1)
- Sam Joseph − recording (track 6)
- Joe Carra – mastering
- Jason Galea – photography, design

== Charts ==
Chart performance for Changes
Chart (2022)	Peak position
Australian Albums (ARIA)	4
UK Album Downloads (OCC)	79
UK Progressive Albums (OCC)	13
US Top Album Sales (Billboard)	44
