= Entropy (album) =

Studio album by King Gizzard & the Lizard Wizard
- Released: 4 December 2026
- Genres: Techno; house
- Label: p(doom)

King Gizzard & the Lizard Wizard chronology
Alien Metal (2026)	Entropy (2026)

Singles from Entropy
- 1. "Rogue Wave" Released: 10 November 2026

Entropy is the upcoming twenty-ninth studio album by Australian rock band King Gizzard & the Lizard Wizard, to be released on 4 December 2026 through p(doom) Records.

== Background ==
Entopy was announced on 10 November 2026, alongside the release of the lead single "Rogue Wave" as well as the announcement of their North America tour for 2027.

== Composition ==
The album was developed alongside the band's previous release, Alien Metal, during an extensive series of recording sessions centered through the use of a modular synth rig named "Nathan", which had become an important part of their musical experimentation and live performances. The band initially intended to release both records simultaneously, but the recordings eventually developed into two distinct projects. According to frontman Stu Mackenzie, Entropy began to take on its own identity and required additional time to develop.

Mackenzie explained that while Alien Metal was recorded at 143 beats per minute in F-sharp, Entropy was developed at 160 beats per minute in A major. He described the album as having a more cosmic and melodic sound compared to the darker, rougher textures of its companion record.

== Track listing ==
Entropy track listing
No.	Title	Length
1.	"Aeon"
2.	"Heaven & Hell"
3.	"Hard Sync"
4.	"Rogue Wave"	5:36
5.	"Angel"
6.	"To Mercury…"
7.	"Face of the Earth"
8.	"Entropy"

== Personnel ==
- Stu Mackenzie
- Joey Walker
- Cook Craig
- Ambrose Kenny-Smith
- Lucas Harwood
- Michael Cavanagh
- Joe Carra – mastering
- Jason Galea – artwork, design, photography
- Maclay Heriot – photography
