= Ice, Death, Planets, Lungs, Mushrooms and Lava =

Studio album by King Gizzard & the Lizard Wizard
- Released: 7 October 2022
- Genres: Jazz fusion; psychedelic rock; progressive rock; jazz-funk
- Length: 64:00
- Label: KGLW
- Producer: Stu Mackenzie

King Gizzard & the Lizard Wizard chronology
Omnium Gatherum (2022)	Ice, Death, Planets, Lungs, Mushrooms and Lava (2022)	Laminated Denim (2022)

Full chronology
Demos Vol. 3 + Vol. 4 (2022)	Ice, Death, Planets, Lungs, Mushrooms and Lava (2022)	Laminated Denim (2022)

Singles from Ice, Death, Planets, Lungs, Mushrooms and Lava
- 1. "Ice V" Released: 7 September 2022; 2. "Iron Lung" Released: 4 October 2022

Ice, Death, Planets, Lungs, Mushrooms and Lava is the twenty-first studio album by Australian psychedelic rock band King Gizzard & the Lizard Wizard, released on 7 October 2022 on KGLW.

Initially inspired by the collective writing, recording and editing of the 18-minute track, "The Dripping Tap", from the band's previous studio album, Omnium Gatherum (2022), Ice, Death, Planets, Lungs, Mushrooms and Lava was mostly recorded over the space of a week, with the six band members improvising in a different musical key and tempo each day.

Described as the most "collaborative" King Gizzard album to date, lead vocalist and multi-instrumentalist Stu Mackenzie noted: "All we went in with was a tempo, a key signature, and a title. There was nothing else—no riffs, no melodies, nothing like that. We just went in there and picked up instruments and said, 'Let's go.'"

At the 2023 ARIA Music Awards, the album was nominated and won the award for Best Rock Album.

== Background and recording ==
On 18 June 2022, the band posted a tweet promising three more albums by the end of 2022. More details came on 12 July, when it was reported that the first two of these were "built from all six members jamming for hours", similarly to the recording process of "The Dripping Tap" from Omnium Gatherum.

The album was written during studio sessions that the band came to with very little material. Frontman Stu Mackenzie said in a statement that "All we had prepared as we walked into the studio were these seven song titles". The band also described the songs as being built around the seven modes of the major scale. This is also where the album got its seven-word title, with each first letter corresponding to the first letter of one of the modes: Ice – Ionian, Death – Dorian, Planets – Phrygian, Lungs – Lydian, Mushrooms – Mixolydian, and – Aeolian, Lava – Locrian.

Initial recordings happened over the course of seven days, with the band producing hours of jams. At the end of each day, Mackenzie took those jams and assembled them into songs, from which the band later added overdubs, additional instrumentation, and finally wrote the lyrics as a group.

== Release ==
A music video for "Ice V" premiered on 7 September. It was directed by Danny Cohen. Later the same day, the band revealed the titles, cover artwork, and release dates for their next three albums: Ice, Death, Planets, Lungs, Mushrooms and Lava was released on 7 October; Laminated Denim on 12 October; and Changes on 28 October. On 4 October, a music video, directed by SPOD, was released for "Iron Lung", the second single from the album. The same day as the single release, the band debuted another cut off the album, "Magma", at a concert in Portland, Oregon.

== Critical reception ==
Professional ratings
Aggregate scores
Source	Rating
Metacritic	84/100
Review scores
Source	Rating
AllMusic	4.5/5 stars
Clash	7/10
Gigwise	8/10
Pitchfork	8.1/10
Uncut	8/10

Ice, Death, Planets, Lungs, Mushrooms and Lava received a score of 84 out of 100 from review aggregator Metacritic, based on seven critical reviews.

Reviewing the album for AllMusic, Tim Sendra claimed that "Unlike some of their efforts, which can wear out their welcome in spots, there isn't a moment of boredom or repetition here. Amazingly, it's another fresh start for the band that's on par with career high points like Butterfly 3000, Nonagon Infinity, or Flying Microtonal Banana. King Gizzard are restless and brilliant and listeners must follow everything they do like a hawk because they might unleash something classic." Comparing the album to the rest of the band's oeuvre in a review for Clash, Robin Murray wrote that, "Even amid their storied catalogue, however, 'Ice, Death, Planets, Lungs, Mushrooms And Lava' is quite something." He also called it, "devoutly ambitious" and, "a record to be absorbed at its own pace." Writing about the album for Uncut, Maclay Heriot called the album, "a glorious, dizzy riot with no precursor."

Concluding the review for Gigwise, Brad Sked stated that, "Overall, Ice, Death, Planets, Lungs, Mushrooms And Lava is the output of an untethered, unrestrained colossus of a band who are so relentless in their work ethic. It partly feels like a best-of album, cherry-picking the greatest elements of some their own-made verse – where it feels like the best parts of the likes of I'm in Your Mind Fuzz, Nonagon Infinity, Paper Mache Dream Balloon and Quarters! have come to the foray, whilst adding some fresh paint and incorporating a part of their wider influences to create a splendid kaleidoscopic cocktail."

== Track listing ==
Vinyl releases have tracks 1–2 on side A, 3–4 on side B, 5 on side C, and 6–7 on side D.

Ice, Death, Planets, Lungs, Mushrooms and Lava track listing
No.	Title	Lyrics	Music	Length
1.	"Mycelium"	Stu Mackenzie; Ambrose Kenny-Smith; Joey Walker; Cook Craig; Lucas Harwood	Mackenzie; Kenny-Smith; Michael Cavanagh; Walker; Craig	7:36
2.	"Ice V"	Mackenzie; Kenny-Smith; Craig; Harwood	Mackenzie; Kenny-Smith; Cavanagh; Walker; Craig; Harwood	10:16
3.	"Magma"	Mackenzie; Kenny-Smith; Walker; Craig; Harwood	Mackenzie; Kenny-Smith; Cavanagh; Walker; Craig	9:06
4.	"Lava"	Mackenzie; Kenny-Smith; Craig; Harwood	Mackenzie; Kenny-Smith; Cavanagh; Walker; Craig; Harwood	6:41
5.	"Hell's Itch"	Mackenzie; Kenny-Smith; Walker; Craig; Harwood	Mackenzie; Kenny-Smith; Cavanagh; Walker; Craig	13:28
6.	"Iron Lung"	Mackenzie; Kenny-Smith; Craig; Harwood	Mackenzie; Kenny-Smith; Cavanagh; Walker; Craig	9:05
7.	"Gliese 710"	Mackenzie; Kenny-Smith; Craig; Harwood	Mackenzie; Kenny-Smith; Cavanagh; Craig; Harwood	7:48
Total length:				64:00

== Personnel ==
King Gizzard & the Lizard Wizard

- Stu Mackenzie – vocals, guitar, organ, flute (all tracks), bass (tracks 1–3, 5–7), piano (tracks 1, 4–7), percussion (tracks 1–3, 5, 7), Clavinet (tracks 2–4, 6)
- Ambrose Kenny-Smith – keyboards, saxophone (all tracks), vocals (tracks 1, 2, 4–7), percussion (tracks 1–3, 5–7), harmonica (track 5)
- Michael Cavanagh – drums (all tracks)
- Joey Walker – guitar (tracks 1–4, 6), bass (tracks 1–3, 5, 6), keyboards (track 1), Farfisa (tracks 2, 6), synthesiser (track 4), vocals (track 5)
- Cook Craig – keyboards (all tracks), guitar (tracks 1–4, 6, 7), bass (tracks 1, 7)
- Lucas Harwood – bass (tracks 2, 4, 7), keyboards (tracks 2, 7), piano (track 7)

Production

- Stu Mackenzie – recording, mixing, production
- Joseph Carra – mastering
- Jason Galea – cover art, photography, layout

== Charts ==
Chart performance for Ice, Death, Planets, Lungs, Mushrooms and Lava
Chart (2022–2023)	Peak position
Australian Albums (ARIA)	6
UK Album Downloads (Official Charts)	66
UK Progressive Albums (OCC)	11
US Top Album Sales (Billboard)	93
