= The Dripping Tap =

Single by King Gizzard & the Lizard Wizard

from the album Omnium Gatherum
- Released: 9 March 2022
- Genre: Psychedelic rock; krautrock; stoned soul; jam band; thrash metal
- Length: 18:17
- Label: KGLW
- Songwriters: Ambrose Kenny-Smith, Stu Mackenzie
- Producer: Stu Mackenzie

King Gizzard & the Lizard Wizard singles chronology
"Pleura" (2021)	"The Dripping Tap" (2022)	"Magenta Mountain" (2022)

"The Dripping Tap" is a song by Australian psychedelic rock band King Gizzard & the Lizard Wizard, released in 2022 as the lead single from their twentieth studio album, Omnium Gatherum. Over 18 minutes in length, the song was first composed during studio sessions for the 2019 album Fishing for Fishies and re-recorded with all band members present following a period of remote collaboration during COVID-19 lockdowns.

== Recording ==
While the song was first released on Omnium Gatherum, an early version of the song was first played during the Fishing for Fishies sessions, the song would be scrapped until after COVID-19 lockdowns were lifted, when the song was re-recorded and finished with all band members present. King Gizzard & the Lizard Wizard recorded an extended jam and then edited the best segments into the completed song.

== Composition ==
The song is over 18 minutes in length. Guitar World described it as featuring "drop D, Mixolydian guitar madness set to an irresistible motorik beat (complete with wailing harmonica)". Stereogum described it as "a kosmische rave-up punctuated by soulful outbursts worthy of Hall & Oates" inspired by Krautrock groups such as Can.

== Critical reception ==
Abby Jones of Consequence stated that "The Dripping Tap" "exemplifies that renewed sense of inspiration King Gizzard felt upon returning to the studio."

== Personnel ==
- Lucas Harwood – bass
- Michael Cavanagh – drums
- Cook Craig – guitar, vocals
- Joey Walker – guitar
- Stu Mackenzie – vocals, guitar, bass, organ, piano, percussion
- Ambrose Kenny-Smith – vocals, organ, percussion, electric piano, harmonica

== Charts ==
Chart performance for "The Dripping Tap"
Chart (2022)	Peak position
Australia (ARIA)	33
US Alternative Digital Song Sales (Billboard)	11
US Rock Digital Song Sales (Billboard)	11
