= Fishing for Fishies =

Studio album by King Gizzard & the Lizard Wizard
- Released: 26 April 2019
- Studios: TFS Studios (tracks 1, 2, 4–9); Flightless HQ (tracks 3–5, 9); Hotel rooms in Guadalajara, Tijuana, Monterrey and Mexico City (track 8)
- Genres: Boogie rock; blues rock; roots rock
- Length: 41:56
- Label: Flightless

King Gizzard & the Lizard Wizard chronology
Gumboot Soup (2017)	Fishing for Fishies (2019)	Infest the Rats' Nest (2019)

Singles from Fishing for Fishies
- 1. "Cyboogie / Acarine" Released: 1 February 2019; 2. "Fishing for Fishies" Released: 11 March 2019; 3. "Boogieman Sam" Released: 28 March 2019; 4. "The Bird Song" Released: 24 April 2019

Fishing for Fishies is the fourteenth studio album by Australian psychedelic rock band King Gizzard & the Lizard Wizard. It was released on 26 April 2019 by Flightless and ATO Records. The announcement of the album was accompanied by the release of the title track and its video.

At the ARIA Music Awards of 2019, the album was nominated for Best Blues and Roots Album, losing to The Teskey Brothers for Run Home Slow.

== Background and recording ==
Fishing for Fishies was first teased by the band on 21 January 2019—over a year after the release of the last of their five 2017 albums, Gumboot Soup—when they posted a picture of themselves in the studio on social media with the caption "new music coming soon". Shortly afterward, they released the album's first single, "Cyboogie", as a 7" single with "Acarine" as the B-side, along with an accompanying music video.

In March 2019, details of the album were apparently leaked to webstores, including the album title, cover, and track listing, which included both "Cyboogie" and "Acarine", as well as the entire title track and minute-long previews of the other tracks. The band confirmed the leak on 11 March, officially announcing the album through social media. The next day, the title track was officially released as a music video on YouTube. The album's third single, "Boogieman Sam," was released on 28 March.

Regarding the album, band frontman Stu Mackenzie said, "We tried to make a blues record. A blues-boogie-shuffle-kinda-thing, but the songs kept fighting it—or maybe it was us fighting them. Ultimately though we let the songs guide us this time; we let them have their own personalities and forge their own path. Paths of light, paths of darkness. This is a collection of songs that went on wild journeys of transformation."

Sections of the album were recorded at a house owned by members of Tropical Fuck Storm. During these sessions, members of both bands recorded a large jam known as the "Hat Jam"—elements of which were later reused and incorporated into the first single of King Gizzard's 2022 album Omnium Gatherum, "The Dripping Tap", and Tropical Fuck Storm's joint EP with King Gizzard Satanic Slumber Party.

Shortly before the release of Fishing for Fishies, a short behind-the-scenes documentary titled How to Gut a Fishie was uploaded to YouTube by the band, showcasing clips of the recording sessions of Fishing for Fishies and Hat Jam.

== Critical reception ==
Professional ratings
Aggregate scores
Source	Rating
Metacritic	73/100
Review scores
Source	Rating
AllMusic	4/5 stars
DIY	3.5/5 stars
Exclaim!	8/10
NME	4/5 stars
Pitchfork	4.8/10
Slant	3/5 stars
Under the Radar	8.5/10 stars

The album received mostly positive reviews, though Sophie Kemp of Pitchfork rated it 4.8 out of 10 and wrote that the album "is vaguely about the environment, but mostly about goofing off with expensive equipment in service to the concept of 'boogie oogie ooging'". NME rated it four stars, saying that the album was "their most accessible and immediate album to date". DIY's Connor Thirlwell gave the album three and a half out of five stars, noting that "King Gizzard and the Lizard Wizard still know how to kick ass".

== Track listing ==
Vinyl releases have tracks 1–5 on Side A, and tracks 6–9 on Side B.

Fishing for Fishies track listing
No.	Title	Writer(s)	Length
1.	"Fishing for Fishies"	Stu Mackenzie; Ambrose Kenny-Smith	5:01
2.	"Boogieman Sam"	Mackenzie	4:41
3.	"The Bird Song"	Mackenzie; Kenny-Smith	4:24
4.	"Plastic Boogie"	Mackenzie	3:03
5.	"The Cruel Millennial"	Kenny-Smith; Mackenzie	4:56
6.	"Real's Not Real"	Mackenzie	3:40
7.	"This Thing"	Joey Walker; Mackenzie	3:59
8.	"Acarine"	Mackenzie; Walker	5:24
9.	"Cyboogie"	Mackenzie	6:48
Total length:			41:56

== Personnel ==
Credits for Fishing for Fishies adapted from liner notes.

- Stu Mackenzie – vocals (1–4, 6, 8, 9), electric guitar (1, 2, 4–6, 8), keyboards (1, 2, 6, 9), mellotron (1–3, 6–8), piano (3, 6–8), synthesizer (8, 9), organ (3, 5), bass (2, 3, 5–7), flute (3, 4, 8), drums (2, 8), vibraphone (5, 7), percussion (2, 8)
- Ambrose Kenny-Smith – vocals (1, 2, 4–6, 8), harmonica (1, 2, 4–8), mellotron (2), piano (6), keyboards (9), percussion (5, 6)
- Joey Walker – electric guitar (1, 5, 7), bass (2, 4, 6), synthesizer (7–9), keyboards (7), acoustic guitar (7), percussion (4), vocals (4, 7)
- Cook Craig – electric guitar (1, 2, 7), bass (1, 3, 5), synthesizer (9), vocals (4)
- Michael Cavanagh – drums (1–9), percussion (3–5, 7), vocals (4)
- Lucas Skinner – bass (5), synthesizer (9), shaker (4), vocals (4)
- Eric Moore – drums (1, 6)
- Han-Tyumi – vocals (9)

== Charts ==
Chart performance for Fishing for Fishies
Chart (2019)	Peak position
Australian Albums (ARIA)	4
Belgian Albums (Ultratop Flanders)	142
Belgian Albums (Ultratop Wallonia)	92
French Albums (SNEP)	178
Scottish Albums (Official Charts)	40
UK Albums (Official Charts)	89
UK Independent Albums (Official Charts)	13
US Top Alternative Albums (Billboard)	22
US Independent Albums (Billboard)	10
US Top Album Sales (Billboard)	34
US Top Rock Albums (Billboard)	43
US Vinyl Albums (Billboard)	2
