= Omnium Gatherum (album) =

Studio album by King Gizzard & the Lizard Wizard
- Released: 22 April 2022
- Genre: Psychedelic rock; progressive rock; synth-pop; heavy metal; hip hop; progressive folk
- Length: 80:11
- Label: KGLW
- Producer: Stu Mackenzie; Joey Walker; Cook Craig

King Gizzard & the Lizard Wizard chronology
| Made in Timeland (2022) | Omnium Gatherum (2022) | Ice, Death, Planets, Lungs, Mushrooms and Lava (2022) |

Full chronology
| Satanic Slumber Party (2022) | Omnium Gatherum (2022) | Demos Vol. 3 + Vol. 4 (2022) |

Singles from Omnium Gatherum
- 1. "The Dripping Tap" Released: 9 March 2022; 2. "Magenta Mountain" Released: 29 March 2022; 3. "Kepler-22b" Released: 19 April 2022; 4. "Gaia" / "Presumptuous" Released: 20 May 2022

Omnium Gatherum is the twentieth studio album and first double album by Australian psychedelic rock band King Gizzard & the Lizard Wizard, released on 22 April 2022. The album was announced on 8 March 2022 and made available for pre-order on 22 March. It marked the first studio release where all band members played together live since the onset of the COVID-19 pandemic. As with previous releases, the album features music of numerous genres, including psychedelia, progressive rock, heavy metal and synth-pop, as well as the band's first experiments with hip hop. It received generally positive reviews, although critics were divided on its length and consistency.

== Background and recording ==
During the production of the 2019 album Fishing for Fishies, the band King Gizzard & the Lizard Wizard recorded at a house owned by members of Tropical Fuck Storm. The two bands together recorded a jam session informally titled "Hat Jam" (named after the hats worn by the various members of the bands during the session) – footage of which appeared in the How to Gut a Fishie behind-the-scenes documentary uploaded on 21 April 2019. Elements of the "Hat Jam" were taken by both bands, with King Gizzard incorporating elements of the jam into Omnium Gatherum's first single "The Dripping Tap" while Tropical Fuck Storm incorporated elements into their 2022 joint EP with King Gizzard, Satanic Slumber Party. A limited-edition vinyl, titled Hat Jam, was also released featuring both "The Dripping Tap" and Satanic Slumber Party.

On 29 May 2021, a teaser for the 2021 album Butterfly 3000 was included by the band on a video for their live album Live in Sydney '21. It contained a 15-second snippet that was believed to be a clip from the record. However, the music in the clip did not end up appearing anywhere on the record, and instead was an extract of the then unreleased Omnium Gatherum track "Magenta Mountain". That same day Live in Sydney '21 was released through the band's bootleg program, the 7th live recording in the program, and the 9th album overall.

On 10 August, the band announced via Twitter that they had finished their next album, and included emojis of a diamond and a pickaxe. Then, on 15 August, the band tweeted 2 more emojis; a drop of water and a faucet filling a glass, leading to speculation that these emojis were related to a future album.

On 30 October, the band played an unreleased track from an unspecified album at Melbourne's "Play On Victoria" event at the Sidney Myer Music Bowl. The next day, the band released the lyrics to the song, "Gaia", via a screenshot posted to Twitter.

In January 2022, the tweets with emojis resumed, and the account began to like tweets that were able to discern the song titles. During this batch of emoji tweets, the King Gizzard Twitter account liked a tweet asking the band to like if a double album is coming, leading many to presume that Omnium Gatherum will be a double album.

In February, the band announced a three-hour marathon set in Melbourne, naming the one-off show as Return Of The Curse Of Timeland, set to take place on March 5. During the show, the band played four songs from the record: "Magenta Mountain", "The Garden Goblin", "The Dripping Tap" and "Gaia".

The album is the first studio recording since the COVID-19 pandemic began where the band played together in the studio; K.G. (2020), L.W. (2021), and Butterfly 3000 were recorded remotely during lockdown.

The album's rap songs were the result of Stu Mackenzie learning sampling using numerous vinyl records he had purchased on Discogs, with Ambrose Kenny-Smith then rapping over them. The Guardian described the experiments as a "rare contentious issue within the group".

== Release ==
The album was announced on 8 March 2022, and the band released the eighteen-minute song "The Dripping Tap"—the first song since 2019's Fishing for Fishies featuring performances recorded by all six current members on the same day. In the announcement, bandleader Stu Mackenzie hinted that Omnium Gatherum would be the band's longest studio album so far and represents "a turning point" in their career as it is "going to change the way we write and record music — at least for a while", adding that the band is "entering into our 'jammy period'".

The album's second single, "Magenta Mountain", was released on 29 March, and was accompanied with a video for a live version of the song, recorded on 5 March at the Return of the Curse of Timeland show. A third single, "Kepler-22b", was released on 19 April, also accompanied by a music video.

== Composition ==
Omnium Gatherum is an album that sees the band hopping between numerous different genres, including psychedelia, progressive rock, heavy metal, synth-pop, folk, jazz, R&B, and soul. "The Dripping Tap" is a prog-jam that zigzags between krautrock, thrash metal, stoned soul, neo soul, acid rock, and noise music. "Magenta Mountain" and "Kepler-22b" are dream pop, neo-psychedelia, and psychedelic pop songs reminiscent of the band's 2021 album Butterfly 3000 (with the former featuring a lyrical callback to "Blue Morpho" from Butterfly 3000) that feature "shuffling beats under wonderful harmonies", with the former including electronic pop and the latter incorporating astral-jazz. "Gaia" and "Predator X" are both heavy metal and heavy psych songs following up on the sound of the 2019 album Infest the Rats' Nest (with the latter track featuring the inclusion of a callback to the track "Perihelion"), with the former incorporating thrash metal, psychedelic metal, and psych-prog.

"Ambergris" is a jazz-funk and lounge-funk track, while "Candles" drifts into late 90s chillout. "Sadie Sorceress" and "The Grim Reaper" introduce rap elements to the King Gizzard sound, with the latter incorporating microtonality and psychedelia. "The Garden Goblin" is a twee lo-fi bedroom-prog and psych-pop song, and "Evilest Man" features political acid rock and callbacks to the track "Cyboogie" from the 2019 album Fishing for Fishies. Lounge-influenced closer "The Funeral" has middle eastern guitar flourishes and an ethereal ending. The final few seconds of "The Funeral" consists of a steady ticking at 60 BPM – the same tempo as the consistent "ticking clock" motif present throughout the band's prior album Made in Timeland (2022).

== Critical reception ==
Professional ratings
Aggregate scores
| Source | Rating |
|---|---|
| Metacritic | 72/100 |
Review scores
| Source | Rating |
| AllMusic | 2.5/5 stars |
| Clash | 9/10 |
| Classic Rock | 4/5 stars |
| Gigwise | 7/10 |
| Loud and Quiet | 5/10 |
| Louder Than War | 5/5 stars |
| Mojo | 3/5 stars |
| Pitchfork | 7.3/10 |
| Record Collector | 3/5 stars |
| Under the Radar | 3/5 stars |

Omnium Gatherum received a score of 72 out of 100 from media aggregate site Metacritic based on seven critical reviews.

Clash writer Sam Walker-Smart called Omnium Gatherum "a phenomenal entry-point to 'the Gizzverse'" and "an all-killer no-filler release that may just stand as the best thing King Gizzard & The Lizard Wizard have ever released." Nathan Whittle, writing for Louder Than War, called the album "the distillation of everything that the band are great at and, as always, done purely on their own terms" and "proof that the band are enjoying a newfound freedom of being unshackled from their own self-imposed limitations to work albums through individual styles". David Weinberg, writing for Glide Magazine in 2023, wrote, "the unique and august qualities of Omnium Gatherum warrant . . . a fleshed-out and demonstrative appreciation of the record for the record as the band enters a higher orbit." Alfie Verity of Gigwise was complimentary towards' the band's continued experimentation 20 albums in, but said that the album "lacks a definitive thread" and "the shine wears off at points." Loud and Quiet's Jack Doherty criticized the album's disparate styles, claiming that it "crumbles under its inability to surprise, leaving us with the sound of a band with nowhere left to go." Jordan Blum of Consequence called the album "expansive, assorted, and at least a little self-indulgent, but that's precisely what makes it brilliant." Under the Radar contributor Kyle Kersey wrote "Taken as a complete album experience, it's a little too all over the place to measure up to their most focused work, and its robust length is pretty intimidating. But as a smorgasbord of strange sonic shape-shifting, it's a pretty fun listen."

== Track listing ==
Vinyl releases have track 1 on Side A, tracks 2–6 on Side B, tracks 7–11 on Side C, 12–16 on Side D.

Omnium Gatherum track listing
| No. | Title | Writer(s) | Sampling credits | Length |
|---|---|---|---|---|
| 1. | "The Dripping Tap" | Ambrose Kenny-Smith; Stu Mackenzie | | 18:17 |
| 2. | "Magenta Mountain" | Kenny-Smith; Mackenzie; Joey Walker | | 6:04 |
| 3. | "Kepler-22b" | Cook Craig; Mackenzie | Barney McAll (samples "Yemaya One") | 3:12 |
| 4. | "Gaia" | Michael Cavanagh; Mackenzie; Walker | | 5:11 |
| 5. | "Ambergris" | Walker | | 4:27 |
| 6. | "Sadie Sorceress" | Kenny-Smith; Mackenzie; Walker | Les Reed and Barry Mason (samples "I'm Coming Home") | 3:07 |
| 7. | "Evilest Man" | Mackenzie | | 7:38 |
| 8. | "The Garden Goblin" | Craig; Mackenzie | | 2:56 |
| 9. | "Blame It on the Weather" | Cavanagh; Kenny-Smith; Mackenzie; Walker | | 2:31 |
| 10. | "Persistence" | Craig; Mackenzie | | 3:47 |
| 11. | "The Grim Reaper" | Kenny-Smith; Mackenzie; Walker | Heinz Funk (samples "In the Orient") | 3:05 |
| 12. | "Presumptuous" | Kenny-Smith; Mackenzie | | 4:53 |
| 13. | "Predator X" | Mackenzie | | 3:45 |
| 14. | "Red Smoke" | Kenny-Smith | | 4:21 |
| 15. | "Candles" | Mackenzie | | 4:34 |
| 16. | "The Funeral" | Mackenzie | | 2:23 |
| Total length: | | | | 80:11 |

== Personnel ==
King Gizzard & the Lizard Wizard

- Ambrose Kenny-Smith – vocals (tracks 1, 2, 6–9, 11, 12, 14), organ (track 1), percussion (tracks 1–3, 7–9, 10–12, 14–16), Wurlitzer (tracks 1, 12, 14), harmonica (track 1), synthesiser (track 9), saxophone (tracks 8, 9), Mellotron (track 10), guitar (track 14), vibraphone (track 14)
- Michael Cavanagh – drums (tracks 1–5, 7, 9–16), percussion (track 9)
- Cook Craig – guitar (tracks 1, 2, 7, 10), vocals (tracks 1, 8), synthesiser (tracks 2–5, 8, 10, 13, 15, 16), keyboards (tracks 3, 8, 12), bass (tracks 3, 8, 10), turntable (track 3), Mellotron (tracks 8, 12), percussion (track 8), Wurlitzer (track 10)
- Joey Walker – guitar (tracks 1, 4, 5, 9, 10, 13), vocals (tracks 1, 2, 4, 5, 10), percussion (tracks 2, 5, 7), synthesiser (tracks 2, 5–7, 10, 11, 15), bass (tracks 4, 13), turntable (track 6), Mellotron (tracks 6, 15), bağlama (track 11), flute (track 12)
- Lucas Harwood – bass (track 1)
- Stu Mackenzie – vocals (tracks 1–4, 6–10, 13–16), guitar (tracks 1, 2, 4, 7, 10, 12, 13, 15, 16), bass (tracks 1, 2, 7, 12, 14–16), organ (tracks 1, 5, 9, 16), piano (track 1), percussion (tracks 1–3, 7–12, 15, 16), synthesiser (tracks 2, 5, 7, 8, 10, 14), keyboards (tracks 2, 7, 15, 16), Mellotron (tracks 3, 9, 12), Clavinet (tracks 5, 6), turntable (tracks 6, 11), flute (track 7), vibraphone (tracks 7, 15), Wurlitzer (tracks 7, 12, 14–16), vocoder (track 7)

Additional musicians

- Millicent Smith – vocals (track 6)
- Amy Findlay – drums (track 10)
- Madeline Wright – party sounds (track 12)

Production

- Stu Mackenzie – production (tracks 1–4, 6–16), mixing (tracks 1–4, 6–16), recording (tracks 1–4, 6, 7, 9–16)
- Michael Cavanagh – recording (tracks 2, 3, 5, 9–11)
- Cook Craig – production (tracks 3, 8), recording (tracks 3, 8, 10)
- Joey Walker – production (tracks 5, 6), recording (tracks 5, 6), mixing (track 5)
- Ambrose Kenny-Smith – recording (tracks 9, 14)
- Joseph Carra – mastering
- Jason Galea – artwork

== Charts ==
Chart performance for Omnium Gatherum
| Chart (2022) | Peak position |
|---|---|
| Australian Albums (ARIA) | 4 |
| UK Album Downloads (OCC) | 12 |
| UK Progressive Albums (OCC) | 13 |
| US Top Album Sales (Billboard) | 8 |
| US Independent Albums (Billboard) | 33 |
| US Top Alternative Albums (Billboard) | 22 |
| US Top Rock & Alternative Albums (Billboard) | 46 |
