= King Gizzard & the Lizard Wizard =

Australian rock band

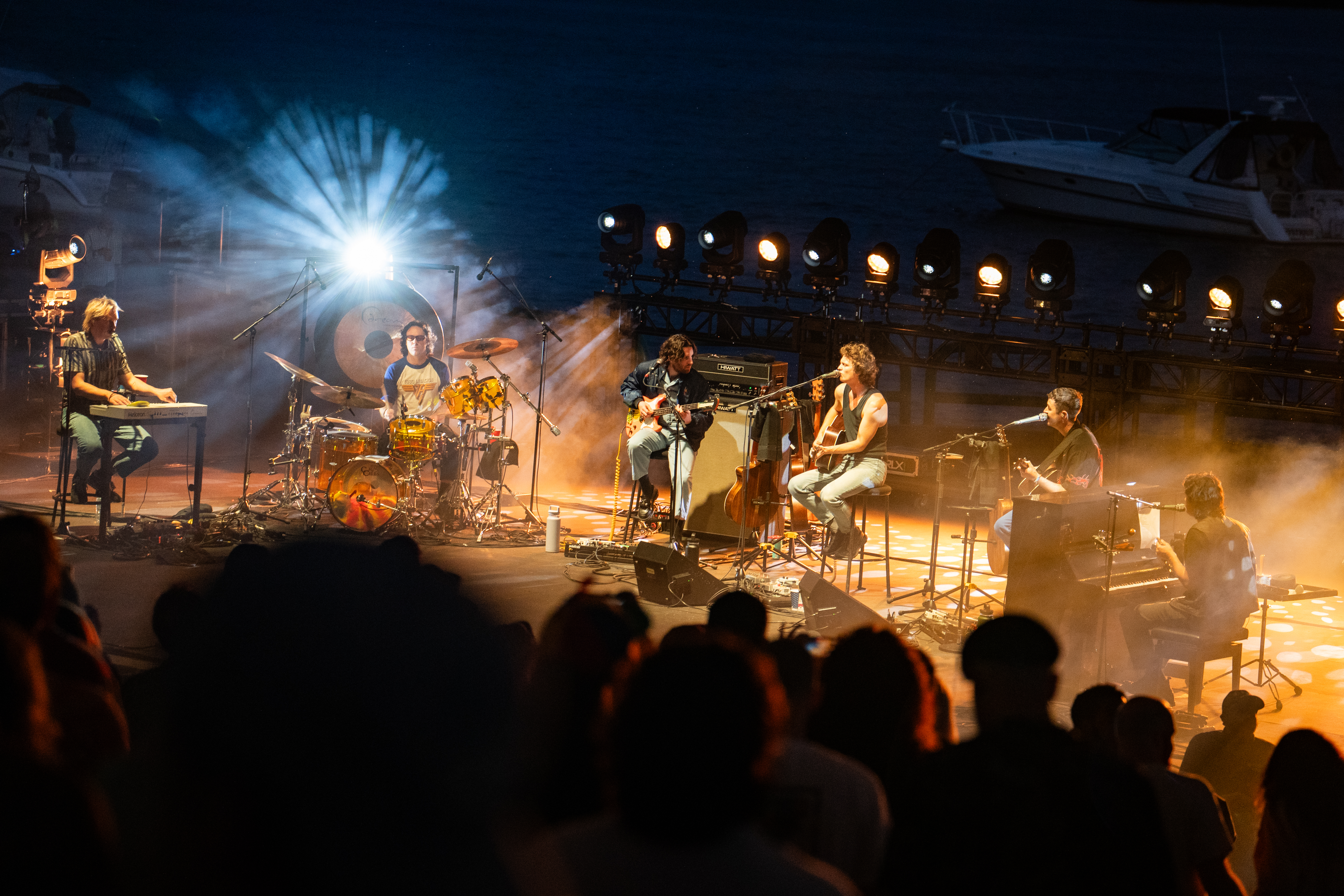
- King Gizzard & the Lizard Wizard performing in Detroit in 2024. Left to Right: Cook Craig, Michael Cavanagh, Lucas Harwood, Stu Mackenzie, Joey Walker, and Ambrose Kenny-Smith.

Background information
- Origin: Melbourne, Victoria, Australia
- Genres: Psychedelic rock; garage rock; psychedelic pop; progressive rock; jam band; heavy metal; electronic
- Works: Discography; songs
- Years active: 2010–present
- Labels: Flightless; Heavenly; ATO; Shock; Castle Face; KGLW; p(doom)
- Members: Stu Mackenzie; Joey Walker; Michael Cavanagh; Lucas Harwood; Cook Craig; Ambrose Kenny-Smith
- Past members: Eric Moore
- Website: kinggizzardandthelizardwizard.com

King Gizzard & the Lizard Wizard (KGLW) are an Australian rock band formed in 2010 in Melbourne, Victoria. The band's current lineup consists of Stu Mackenzie (vocals, guitar, flute), Ambrose Kenny-Smith (vocals, harmonica, keyboards, saxophone), Cook Craig (guitar, keyboards, vocals), Joey Walker (guitar, vocals), Lucas Harwood (bass, vocals), and Michael Cavanagh (drums, vocals). They are known for exploring multiple genres, staging energetic live shows, and building a prolific discography.

The band's early releases blended surf music and garage rock and were released on their label, Flightless. They released several psychedelic rock albums in the early 2010s, and incorporated a broader range of musical styles later in the decade, such as jazz fusion on Quarters! and the folk-inspired Paper Mâché Dream Balloon. In 2016, they generated more mainstream attention with Nonagon Infinity, which won the ARIA Award for Best Hard Rock or Heavy Metal Album.

Noted for their prolific discography, in 2017 the band fulfilled a promise to release five studio albums within the calendar year, and also marked the beginning of a trilogy of microtonal albums with Flying Microtonal Banana. Subsequent releases integrated heavy metal, synth-pop, and progressive rock, and feature lyrics that address environmental themes and a connected fictional universe termed the "Gizzverse" by fans.

Alien Metal, their 28th studio album, was surprise-released on 14 August 2026.

== History ==
=== 2010–2012: Formation, early releases, and 12 Bar Bruise ===
The band members all grew up and went to school in the Deniliquin, Melbourne, and Geelong areas of Australia. Stu Mackenzie and Cook Craig were in a high-school band called Revolver & Sun while at the same time Ambrose Kenny-Smith and Lucas Skinner were in a band named Sambrose Automobile. Additionally, Mackenzie, Skinner, and Michael Cavanagh were also simultaneously in a band called The Houses. Some songs eventually released by King Gizzard & the Lizard Wizard originated during this time period, such as "Crying" from Oddments being a Revolver & Sun original.

Mackenzie, Moore, and Walker met studying the music industry at RMIT University, and the other members were mutual friends. The band started off with a fluid lineup of members, fluctuating from the original three of Mackenzie, Walker, and Moore to up to 11 members, however, the lineup eventually became Mackenzie, Walker, Moore, Kenny-Smith, Cavanagh, Craig, and Harwood. Kenny-Smith was the last to enter the band in 2011. Mackenzie stated in a 2017 interview that the band's name is purposefully nonsense as while the band and its lineup was still fluid in its early years most members considered the band "not an important group" and as the "band we started to not really mean anything" and regularly experimented with "weird names" with King Gizzard and the Lizard Wizard being "the one that was the most absurd, and I guess for that reason it was just the one that stuck." Melbourne artist Jason Galea has created all of the band's album art and the majority of their music videos.

The band's first releases were two singles in 2010, both self-released: "Sleep / Summer!" and "Hey There / Ants & Bats". The band's next release, 2011's Anglesea (named after Anglesea, Victoria, Mackenzie's home town), was released as a four-track EP on CD. These releases did not become available digitally until the Teenage Gizzard compilation in 2020.

Willoughby's Beach was released by Shock Records on 21 October. Beat Magazine described the nine-track garage rock EP as "filled to the teeth with consistently killer hooks".

The band's first full-length album, 12 Bar Bruise, was released on 7 September 2012. The 12-track garage rock album was self-recorded, and several tracks used unconventional recording methods; for example, the vocals for the album's title track were recorded through four iPhones placed around a room while Mackenzie sang into one of them.

=== 2013–2014: Eyes Like the Sky, Float Along – Fill Your Lungs, Oddments, and I'm in Your Mind Fuzz ===
The band's second full-length album, Eyes Like the Sky, was released on 22 February 2013. Described as a "cult western audio book", the album is narrated by Broderick Smith, Kenny-Smith's father, and tells the story of outlaws, Native Americans, and other figures of the American frontier. It was written collaboratively by Smith and Stu Mackenzie. Mackenzie said the album was inspired by Western films and Red Dead Redemption, among other things, and was written as a response to being typecast in their previous releases.

The band's third full-length album, Float Along – Fill Your Lungs, was released on 27 September. King Gizzard shifted from garage rock to a more mellow folk and psychedelic sound on the eight-track album. It also saw Eric Moore start playing drums after previously playing theremin and keyboards. According to the liner notes from the album, this album is the first time they started to experiment with odd time signatures, which they would use on many songs going forward.

In October 2013, 12 Bar Bruise won Best Independent Hard Rock, Heavy or Punk Album at the AIR Awards with the band receiving a Carlton Dry Global Music Grant of $50,000 AUD. The grant afforded the band the opportunity to tour internationally for the first time in 2014 and fund professional recording at Daptone studios in Brooklyn.

Oddments released on 7 March 2014. On this album, the band is more melodic, with the vocals being more prominent. The album's mixing style led to it being described as "recorded through a woollen sock in an adjacent room".

The band's fifth full-length album, I'm in Your Mind Fuzz, was released on 31 October. The album touches on elements of fantasy, and lyrically delves into the concept of mind control. This was the first time the band took a "traditional" approach to writing and recording an album: the songs were written, the band rehearsed together, and they recorded the songs "as a band" in the studio. Pitchfork described the album as "open[ing] with a sprint" and ending "with some of their best slow jams". In 2019, the album came at #6 on Happy Mag's list of "the 25 best psychedelic rock albums of the 2010s".

=== 2015–2016: Quarters!, Paper Mâché Dream Balloon, Gizzfest, and Nonagon Infinity ===
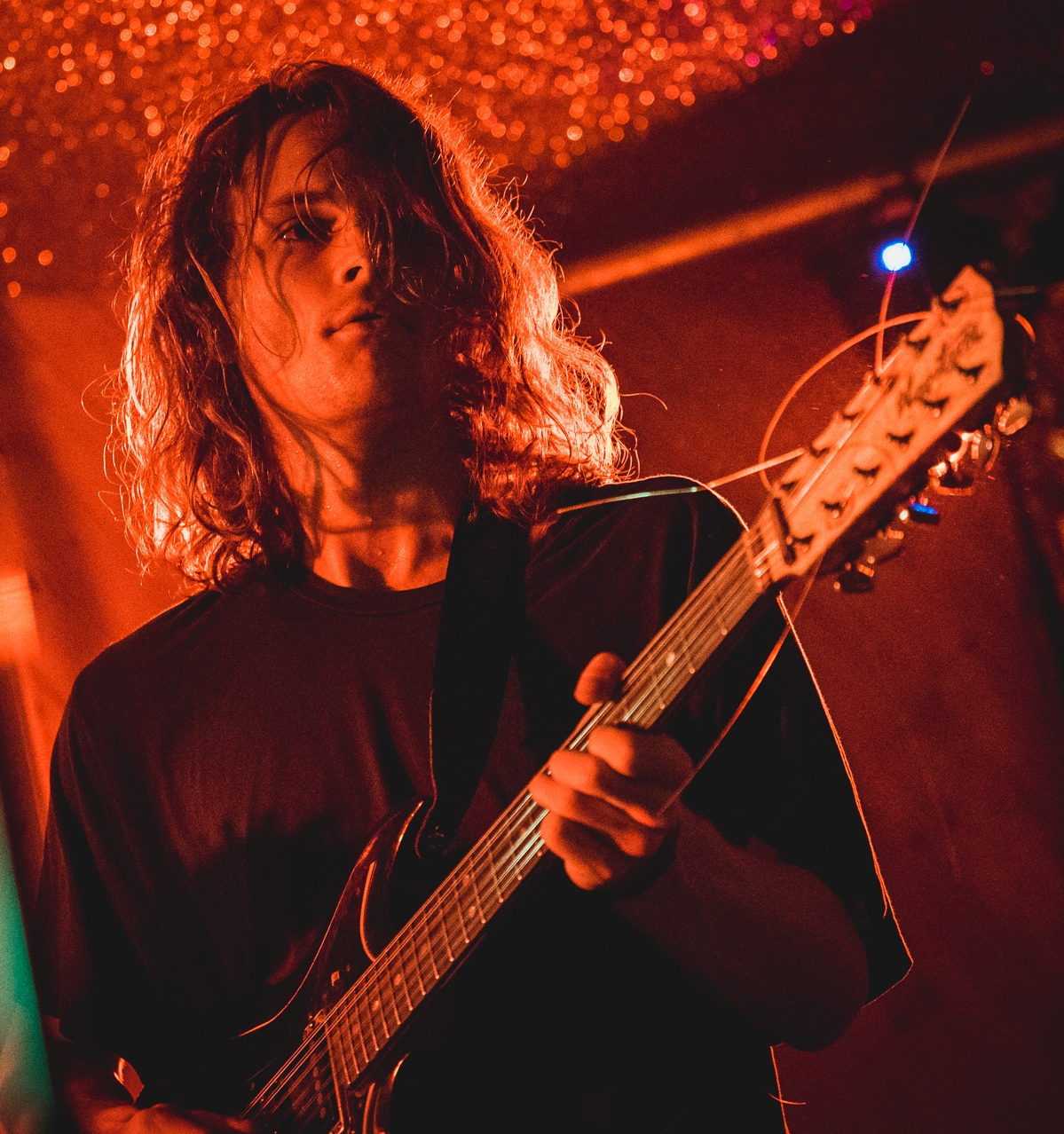
Mackenzie performing in 2016

2015 saw the band launch Gizzfest in Melbourne, a two-day music festival that was held annually and toured Australia, featuring both local and international acts.

Quarters!, King Gizzard's sixth full-length album, was released on 1 May 2015. The album features four songs, each running for 10 minutes and 10 seconds, making each song a quarter of the album. Drawing upon jazz fusion and acid rock, the album's more laid-back sound was described as "unlike anything they've released before" by Tonedeaf magazine.

On 17 August, King Gizzard released the title track "Paper Mâché Dream Balloon" as the lead single for the album with the same name. The second single, "Trapdoor", had a music video released on 10 November. On 13 November, the band released its seventh full-length album, Paper Mâché Dream Balloon. It features only acoustic instruments and was recorded on Mackenzie's parents' farm in rural Victoria, and features "a collection of short, unrelated songs" described as "mellow, defuzzed psychedelia". It was the band's first album to be released in the United States via ATO Records.

The band's eighth full-length album, Nonagon Infinity, was released worldwide on 29 April 2016. Described by Mackenzie as a "never-ending album", it features nine songs connected by musical motifs that flow "seamlessly" into each other, with the last track "linking straight back into the top of the opener". On 8 March, the band released a video for the first single, "Gamma Knife". The song "People Vultures" was released on 4 April, and its music video on 6 May. The album received high praise from critics, with Pitchfork's Stuart Berman writing that it "yields some of the most outrageous, exhilarating rock 'n' roll in recent memory". Happy Mag's Maddy Brown described it as "an intensely striking, ferocious sound that gets the blood flowing and heart racing". The band earned its first ARIA Award when Nonagon Infinity won the 2016 ARIA Award for Best Hard Rock or Heavy Metal Album.

=== 2017: Five albums in one year ===
We had this random batch of songs. It was not a cohesive record at all. So we thought we'd split it up and split again until it became five. We worked on Nonagon Infinity pretty intensely in 2015 and 2016. We came close to burning ourselves out, or at least wringing each other's necks. We took a break, and then all these random, disparate song ideas came out of that void of not recording for a little while. Then we worked on everything, one album at a time.

— Stu Mackenzie, November 2017

The band's ninth full-length album, Flying Microtonal Banana, was recorded in the band's own studio and released on 24 February 2017. The album was recorded using custom instruments adhering to 24 TET based on the Bağlama. It was described as "a soaring take on microtonal music" by Guitar World. Three tracks were issued in advance: "Rattlesnake" (the opening track) in October 2016, "Nuclear Fusion" in December, and "Sleep Drifter" in January 2017. The music video for "Rattlesnake", directed by Jason Galea, was described by Happy Mag's Luke Saunders as "a masterclass in hypnotism" and features a scrolling 3D-animated desert background with the band playing in front of it.

Another full-length album, Murder of the Universe, was released on 23 June. It is a concept album divided into three chapters: The Tale of the Altered Beast and The Lord of Lightning vs. Balrog (released on 30 May), and Han-Tyumi and the Murder of the Universe (11 April). Spill Magazine explained that the album "describes the impeding doom of the world in a dark fantasy genre kind of way". It is narrated by Leah Senior for the first two chapters, and a text-to-speech program providing the voice of Han-Tyumi for the final chapter. The band made their international television debut on 17 April, performing "The Lord of Lightning" on Conan on TBS in the United States.

The album Sketches of Brunswick East was released on 18 August. It is a collaboration with Alex Brettin's psychedelic jazz project, Mild High Club. Taking inspiration from Miles Davis' 1960 album Sketches of Spain, as well as the band's base recording location of Brunswick East in Melbourne, it is an improvisational album. Mackenzie described the record as relating to the constant changes in their neighborhood, and trying to finding beauty in the location.

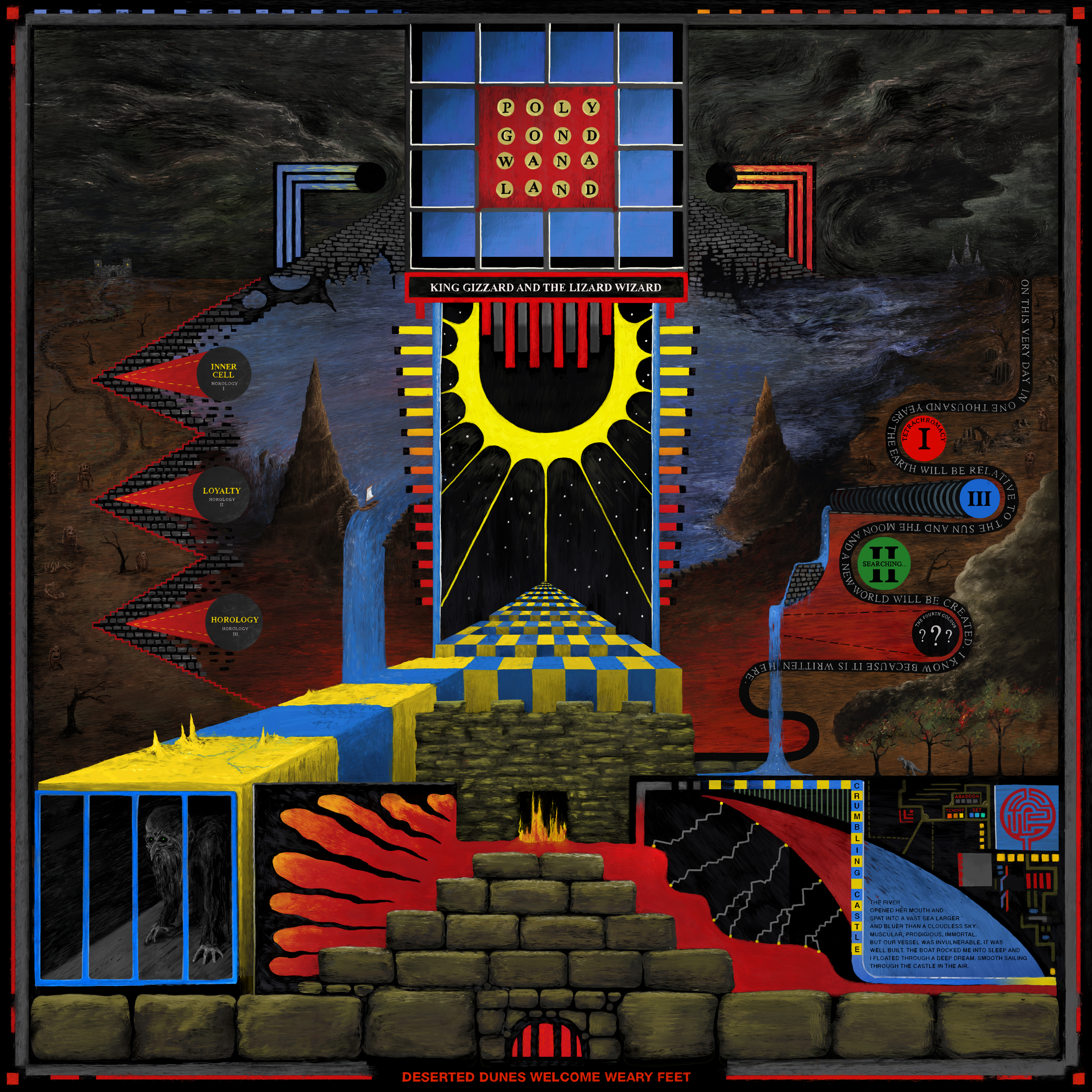
Polygondwanaland, the fourth of the band's five 2017 albums, was released into the public domain, inspiring many independent labels throughout the world to issue unique versions of it.

The album Polygondwanaland was released as a free download on 17 November. The band encouraged fans and independent record labels to create their own pressings of the album, stating that it was "free to download and if you wish, free to make copies". The first track "Crumbling Castle", was released on 18 October. A music video created by Jason Galea accompanied its release on YouTube. As of August 2023, 363 different versions of the album have been recorded on the physical music database Discogs, and it has been called "the ultimate vinyl release" by Louder than Sound.

Gumboot Soup, the fifth and final album of 2017, was released on 31 December. Mackenzie explained in an interview that the album consisted of songs that didn't work in, or came after, the other 2017 records, but that they were not b-sides. They had intended to release Changes, but it wasn't finished yet.

In December, Consequence of Sound named King Gizzard & the Lizard Wizard Band of the Year, praising both the quantity and quality of their releases that year.

=== 2018–2019: Fishing for Fishies, Infest the Rats' Nest, and reissues ===
Throughout 2018, King Gizzard continued to perform live shows, but did not release any new material. Instead, they re-released five older records—Willoughby's Beach, 12 Bar Bruise, Eyes Like the Sky, Float Along – Fill Your Lungs, and Oddments—on CD and vinyl. They also released an official pressing of Polygondwanaland. The 2019 Gizzfest did not take place. After the Gizzfest event in 2018, the band announced the cancellation of the festival on their official Instagram page. Some fans believe this was due to their extensive touring schedule.

In January 2019, the band announced that new music was in the works. On 1 February, they released a new single, "Cyboogie", as a 7-inch single backed with "Acarine". A week later they announced another North American tour, as well as a show at Alexandra Palace in London, which they stated would be their "biggest show ever".

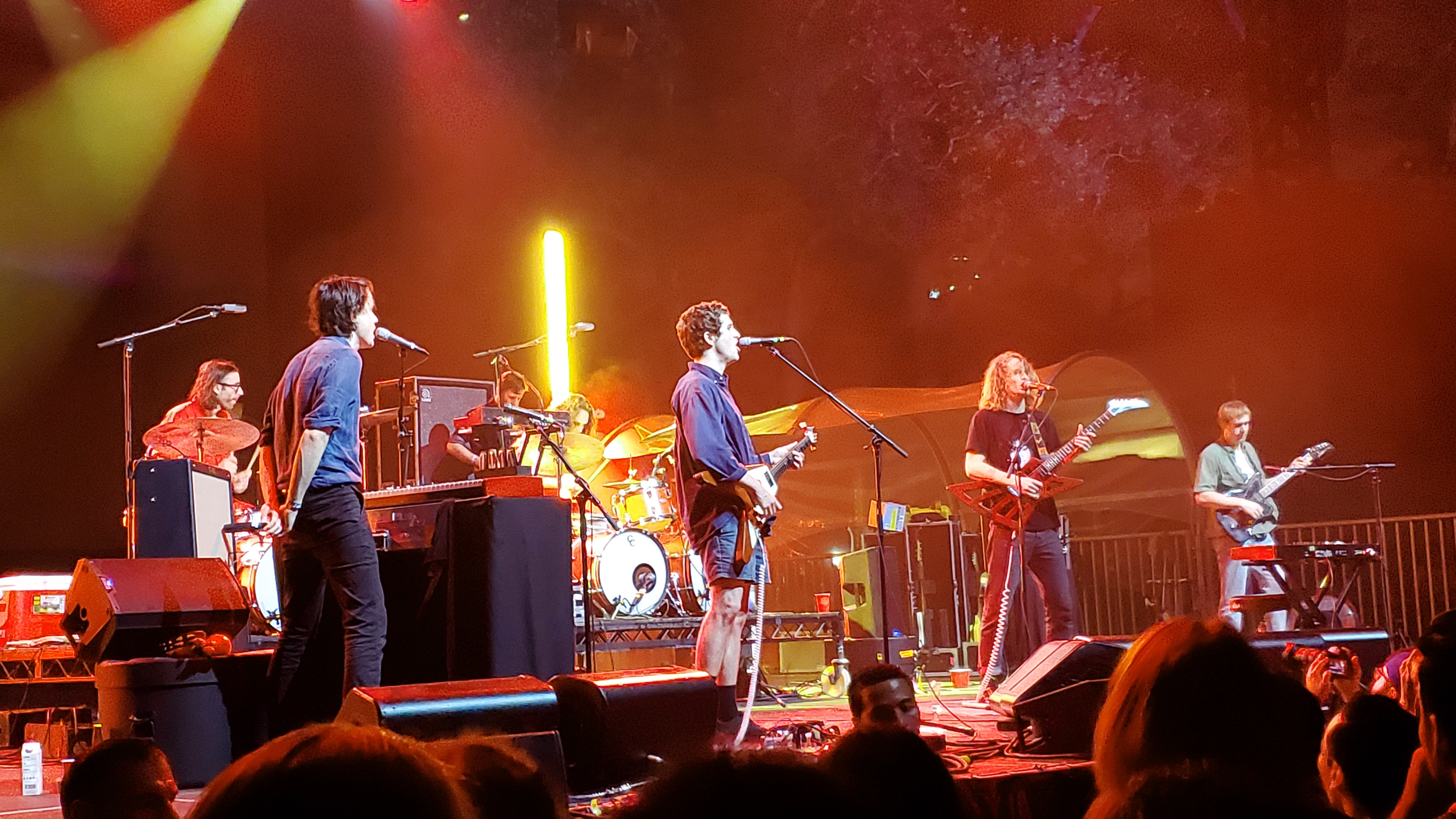
King Gizzard & the Lizard Wizard performing in New York City, 2019

In March, the band announced the album Fishing for Fishies, with a release date of 26 April. A day later, the band officially released a music video for the title track on YouTube. Later that month, the band released another single from the album, "Boogieman Sam", and on 24 April, the band dropped a final single, "The Bird Song". Two days later, the album was released.

On 9 April, before the release of Fishing for Fishies, the band released a music video for their new song, "Planet B". On the 30th, Mackenzie confirmed that the band's next album (featuring "Planet B") was in the works, and had no release date yet. The album was later revealed to be titled Infest the Rats' Nest. Mackenzie also announced that Gizzfest would be held outside of Australia for the first time that year. Infest the Rats' Nest, which was released on 16 August, featured an entirely different style – thrash metal. At the ARIA Music Awards of 2019, it was nominated for the Best Hard Rock or Heavy Metal Album.

=== 2020: Chunky Shrapnel, K.G., L.W. and Eric Moore's departure ===
In January 2020, the band released three live albums as downloads on Bandcamp, pledging to donate 100% of the proceeds to charities helping wildlife affected by the 2019–20 Australian bushfire season.

During the COVID-19 pandemic, the band postponed their Greek Theatre and Red Rocks three-hour marathon shows for later in the year. The band had also produced a film to be released, titled Chunky Shrapnel; however, also due to the outbreak, the initial viewing was postponed for a later date, and then cancelled. It was directed by John Angus Stewart, and recorded during the band's 2019 tour in Europe. A live album of the same name was released on 24 April, featuring recordings from numerous shows on the tour along with three ambient studio tracks. The opening track "Evil Star" also features on the live albums released earlier in January.

In April, the band stated that during the COVID-19 lockdown, they had worked on new material for upcoming albums. Mackenzie reported that one will be "chill", another "kind of jazzy", and some of it microtonal. The band was also experimenting with electronic music and polymetres. When asked about more live recordings, Mackenzie said that the band had recorded almost every show they played in 2019, and may release them in a similar fashion to Pearl Jam's official live bootlegs. June saw the release of RATTY, a short documentary about the making of Infest the Rat's Nest. It was made available to rent online with all proceeds going to charities benefiting Aboriginal Australians. After $20,000 had been raised, it was then made free to watch on YouTube. Later that month, in celebration of Love Record Store Day, the band released a limited print of eco-friendly versions of 10 previous releases.

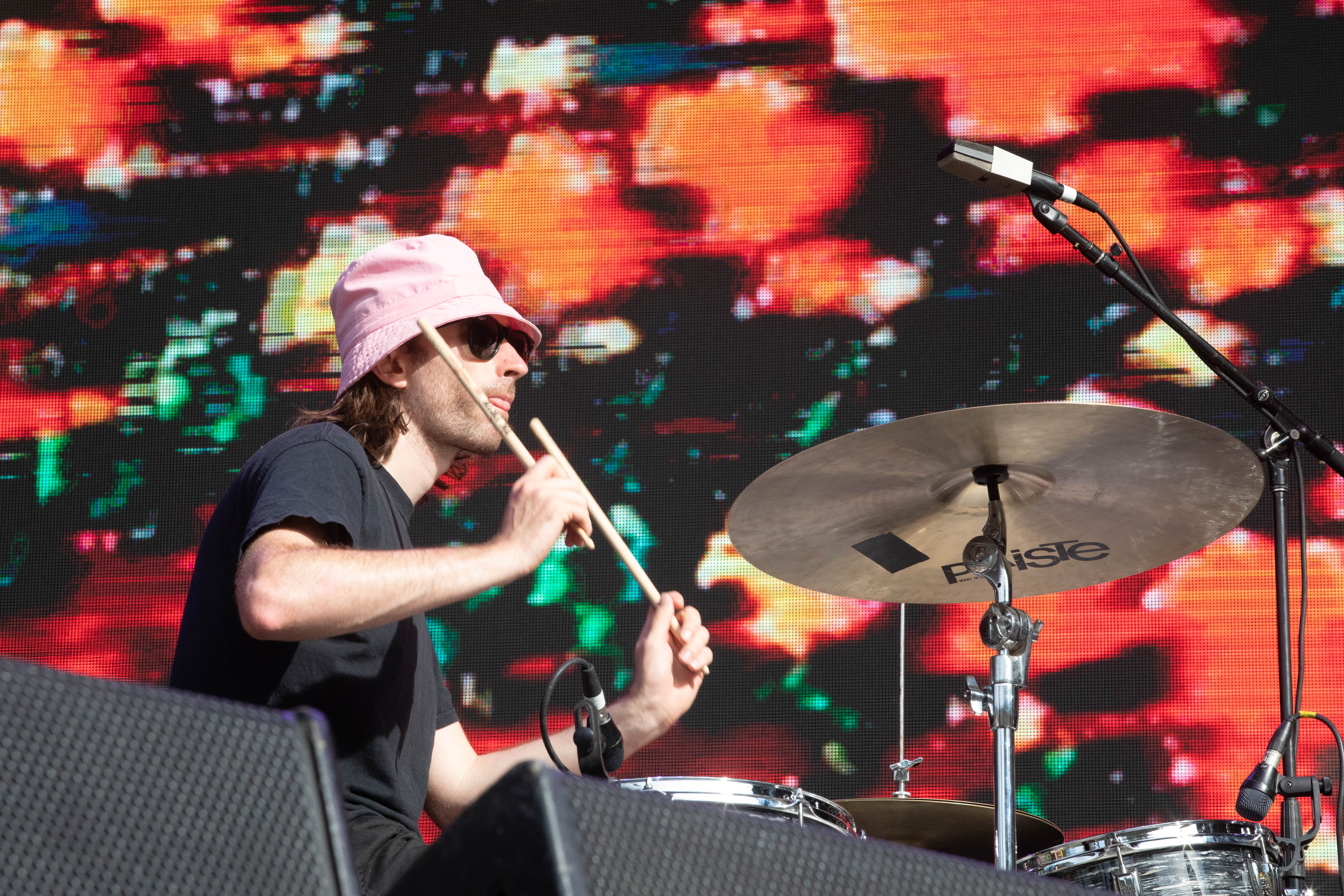
Moore left the band in 2020 to focus on running the Flightless record label.

Again due to the pandemic, the band postponed the marathon shows and North American tour for a second time, with the new dates being for October 2021. However, they confirmed new tour dates, and that they band would release some new albums before said tour. On 25 August, Eric Moore announced his departure from the band (as both an active member and the band's manager) without citing any direct reason, though the band explained that he was stepping away from the band "to focus solely on Flightless Records".

On 20 November, the band released their 16th studio album, K.G. (Explorations into Microtonal Tuning, Volume 2), alongside the album's fourth single, "Automation". The band also included the files for the separate stems within the song for free on their website. They also released the video files for its music video, and asked fans to create their own video with them. All of these files require a torrent client to be installed on the user's device.

On 24 December, the band released their seventh live album, Live in London '19, on Bandcamp. Performed at the 10,000 capacity Alexandra Palace on 5 October 2019, it was the group's largest show until their June 21, 2023 show at the Hollywood Bowl that had a capacity of 17,500.

In an interview with NME, Joey Walker said that 2021 would be a big year of output with some of their most divisive music yet, claiming: "Part of me thinks this is the best we've ever done. And part of me thinks it's the worst." He also talked about making a sequel to Chunky Shrapnel. In 2020, King Gizzard & the Lizard Wizard were listed at No. 47 in Rolling Stone Australia's list of the "50 Greatest Australian Artists of All Time".

The album L.W. (Explorations into Microtonal Tuning, Volume 3), was released on 26 February, as "both a standalone work and a companion piece to" K.G.

=== 2021–2022: Butterfly 3000, Omnium Gatherum, and Gizztober ===
The album Butterfly 3000, was announced on 11 May, saying it would release on 11 June without promotion by singles. They announced five concerts at Sydney's Carriageworks, which would have different, pre-planned setlists themed around a different style of music. Butterfly 3000 received generally positive reviews; reviewers commending the album on its "sonic adventurism" and "pop-oriented additions [that] are a perfect pairing to their existing sound", while another said its "formulaic approach lacks surprise". The album had 10 tracks, and was built around modular synthesizer loops. The album art by Jason Galea featured a "cross-eyed" autostereogram. The remix album Butterfly 3001 was released on 21 January, featuring 21 remixes of Butterfly 3000's songs; a music video starring Australian media personality John Safran was released for DJ Shadow's remix of "Black Hot Soup". In February, the band announced a three-hour marathon set in Melbourne on 5 March, named Return of the Curse of Timeland. It coincided with the release of the album Made in Timeland.

On 8 March, they released the 18-minute track "The Dripping Tap" as a single from the album Omnium Gatherum, released on 22 April. On 15 March, they released a joint EP alongside Tropical Fuck Storm titled Satanic Slumber Party. The EP originated during the recording sessions for Fishing for Fishies, during which the two groups collaborated on a jam section titled "Hat Jam". Sections of both "The Dripping Tap" and "Satanic Slumber Party" were adapted from these sessions, and a special limited-edition 12" vinyl, Hat Jam, contained both releases.

In June, the band won the inaugural Environmental Music Prize with their 2020 single "If Not Now, Then When?" They were awarded $20,000 in prize money, the entirety of which was donated to The Wilderness Society. Later that summer, the band stated their next two albums were "built from hours-long jams and then pieced together after the fact". In August, they cancelled the remaining 13 dates of their summer European tour so Stu Mackenzie could return to Australia for treatment in his battle with Crohn's disease.

On 1 September, the band announced that they planned to release three studio albums in October 2022. A music video for one of their new songs, "Ice V", premiered on the 7th, alongside the reveal of the titles, cover artwork, and release dates for the albums. They all released in October: Ice, Death, Planets, Lungs, Mushrooms and Lava on the 7th, Laminated Denim on the 12th, and Changes on the 28th.

=== 2023: PetroDragonic Apocalypse and The Silver Cord ===
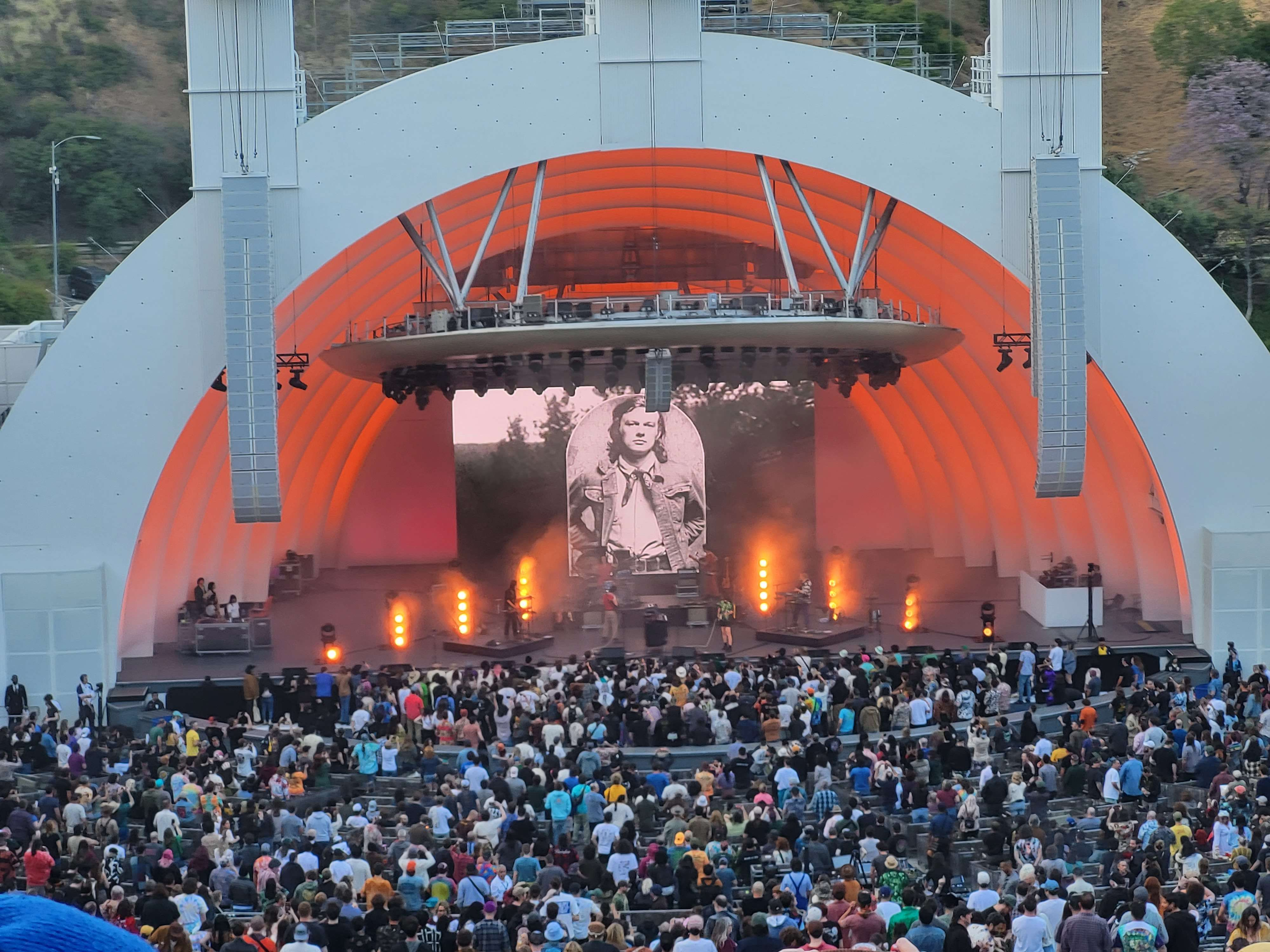
King Gizzard's June 2023 show at the Hollywood Bowl, Los Angeles, featured a tribute to Broderick Smith, who had collaborated with the band on Eyes Like the Sky.

On 24 January, the band released the official live bootleg Live At Red Rocks '22. The 86-track, eight-hour release documents the band's three-night run at Red Rocks Amphitheater. Several independent labels have created physical releases of the bootleg, including vinyl, CD, and cassette runs. In February, the band announced that they would no longer be performing at that year's Byron Bay Bluesfest in protest of the festival's booking of indie band Sticky Fingers; King Gizzard said Sticky Fingers represented "misogyny, racism, transphobia and violence".

In May, the band announced the album PetroDragonic Apocalypse; or, Dawn of Eternal Night: An Annihilation of Planet Earth and the Beginning of Merciless Damnation Lucas Harwood said the album would be one of two upcoming releases exploring a "Yin and Yang" concept. They would sound much different from each other, but complement each other. The album's first single, "Gila Monster", was released alongside a music video on 16 May, and the second single, "Dragon", was released on 6 June with its music video. The band then went on tour throughout the United States to promote the album. PetroDragonic Apocalypse was released on 16 June.

In a 28 April 2022 interview with The Guardian Joey Walker confirmed that the band produced seven rap songs for an album, but decided not to release it due to optics, saying it looked bad being "six white idiot psych-rock guys making hip-hop". Two of these songs would appear on Omnium Gatherum; Sadie Sorceress and The Grim Reaper. On 22 June 2023, while giving an interview to the Office Hours Live podcast, Joey Walker and Lucas Harwood confirmed that a rap album had been "in the pipeline" and was "almost" completed, but got shelved indefinitely.

In July, the band confirmed that they had been uploading albums from their bootlegger program onto streaming services under the name "bootleg gizzard". In September, they announced a series of marathon tours in the U.S. for 2024, and said that the album accompanying PetroDragonic Apocalypse is "synth-y".

In September, they announced The Silver Cord. Three singles ("Theia", "The Silver Cord", and "Set"), and a music video released on 3 October. The album was released on 27 October.

=== 2024–present: p(doom), Flight b741, Phantom Island and techno albums ===
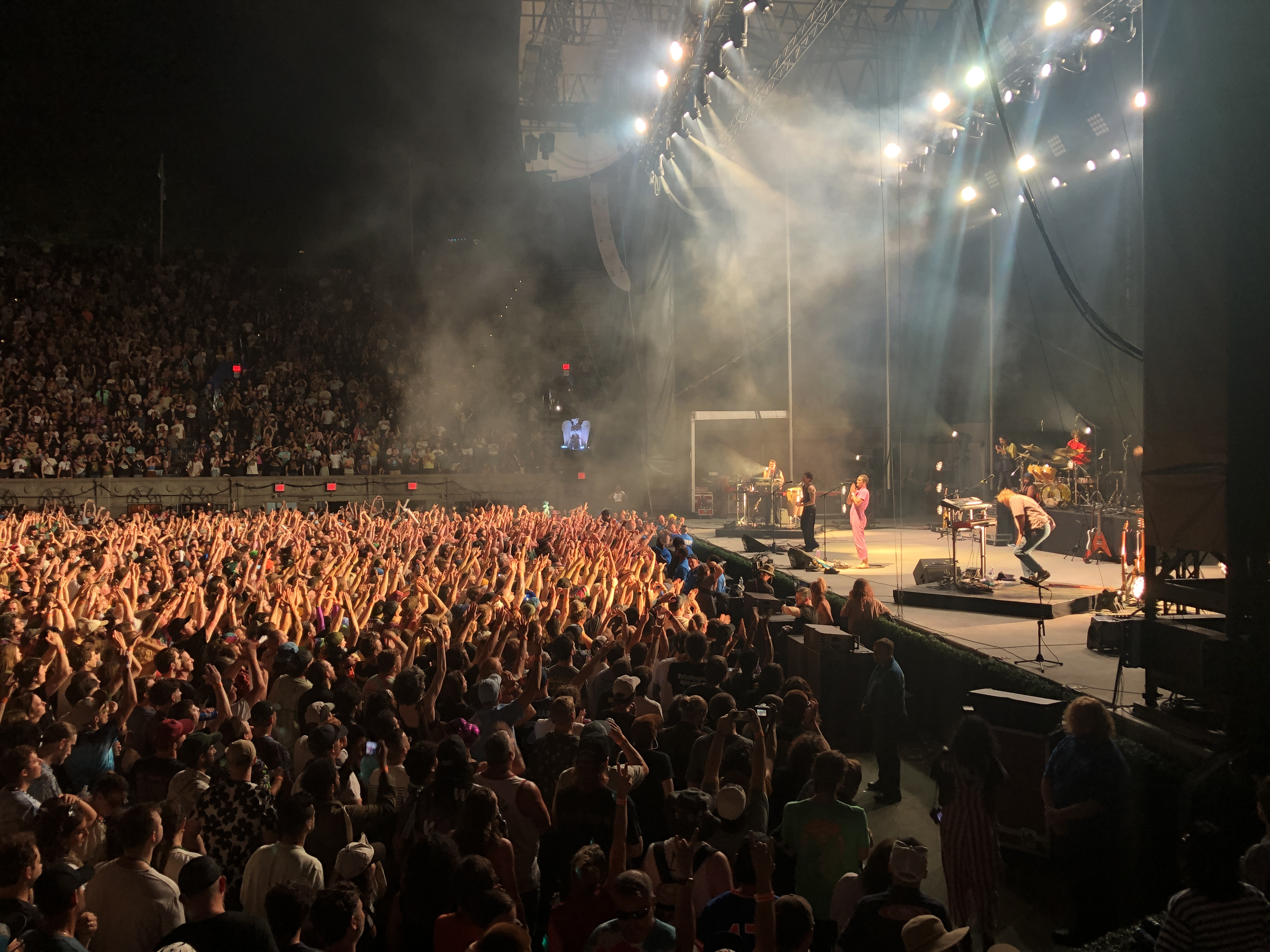
King Gizzard and the Lizard Wizard at Forest Hills on August 2, 2025, as part of their Phantom Island Tour.

The World Tour 2024 in support of The Silver Cord consisted of 64 shows overall across South America, Europe, United States and Canada, with all North American shows recorded, live-streamed and released for bootleggers.

On 6 May 2024, the band announced the launch of their new record label, p(doom). The first album released on p(doom) was Ill Times, a collaboration between Ambrose Kenny-Smith and Jay Watson, released on 19 July.

Flight b741, the 26th studio album and their first released on p(doom), was released on 9 August. Each song from the album was debuted live during tours in 2024.

On 29 October 2024, the single "Phantom Island" was released and announced to be part of the upcoming 27th studio album, featuring orchestral arrangements and material written concurrently with Flight b741. The band also announced a tour consisting of rock shows and orchestral performances with a different 28 piece orchestra in each city, each conducted by Sarah Hicks, concluding with a three-day camping residency in Buena Vista, Colorado dubbed Field of Vision.

In early 2025, the band contributed unreleased material to charity compilations, licensed three songs ("Robot Stop", "Supercell" and "The Dripping Tap") for the upcoming video game Ultrakill, and announced further European, North American, and Australian tours incorporating rock, orchestral, and rave sets.

Phantom Island was officially announced on 9 April 2025, alongside its track list and the singles "Deadstick" on 15 April, followed by "Grow Wings and Fly" on 13 May. The album released on 13 June 2025.

In an 27 May interview with Rocking magazine, Kenny-Smith confirmed the band was in the studio "almost every weekday" with a focus on Eurorack synth. Kenny-Smith also opened up about the band's creative process, saying that Mackenzie is the "captain" but the direction and genre the album goes is entirely up to whoever has the courage to become "first mate." Mackenzie reiterated that an electronic album is "probably the next thing" the band is working on in an interview with Colorado Public Radio on 22 August.

On 25 July 2025, the band removed their catalog from Spotify in protest to the ethics, politics, and business practices of the streaming platform's CEO Daniel Ek. The band posted on Instagram: "New demos collection out everywhere except Spotify (fuck Spotify). You can bootleg it if you wanna." and "Spotify CEO Daniel Ek invests millions in AI military drone technology. We just removed our music from the platform. Can we put pressure on these Dr. Evil tech bros to do better?" This announcement came amidst the band releasing two more demo albums, Vol. 7 and 8, and changing the pricing of all of their music on Bandcamp to a pay what you want model.

The Phantom Island Tour concluded in December 2025, with the band confirming a hiatus from touring until August 2026 for Field of Vision II. During this hiatus on 20 March 2026, the band posted a video of them in a recording studio with Billy Strings, fueling speculation that a bluegrass album is in the works.

Alien Metal, their 28th studio album, was announced on 8 July alongside the release of a music video starring Vince Colosimo for the single "Level 5." The album saw the group return to a focus on electronic music, and was written and recorded on a custom synthesiser rig nicknamed "Nathan." Alien Metal was released on 14 August 2026.

King Gizzard & The Lizard Wizard collaborated with Justice, SZA, and Tame Impala on "Flower in a Hurricane", the theme song for the video game Grand Theft Auto VI. "Flower in a Hurricane" became King Gizzard & The Lizard Wizard's first appearance on the Billboard Hot 100 singles chart in the United States when it debuted on the chart at number 62 in October 2026. The song was also the band's first Top 40 hit on the UK Singles Chart.

On 10 November 2026 they released a single "Rogue Wave" along with an announcement for their 29th album Entropy for release on 4 December 2026. Along with this they announced dates for their Fall 2027 North America Tour. Field of Vision III was canceled due to Meadow Creek being unable to extend their permit deal with Chaffee County in time.

== Musical styles ==
The band has explored a wide range of genres, primarily melding psychedelic rock, garage rock, acid rock, progressive rock, surf rock, krautrock, psychedelic pop, indie rock and neo-psychedelia. Several later releases have been in heavy metal styles, in particular thrash metal and stoner metal on Infest the Rats' Nest and progressive metal on PetroDragonic Apocalypse, and also sludge and groove metal. Folk, jazz and Tropicália have also occasionally been integrated into their sound. The band wrote Butterfly 3000 as a "synth-prog" album entirely in major keys, Paper Mâché Dream Balloon is dedicated entirely to acoustic music, and on Made in Timeland and Omnium Gatherum, the band also explored rap for the first time. In describing their style, Chris DeVille of Stereogum wrote, "It's a rare group that can convincingly blur the lines between Phish, Neu!, King Crimson, and the Osees while never sounding like anything less than themselves."

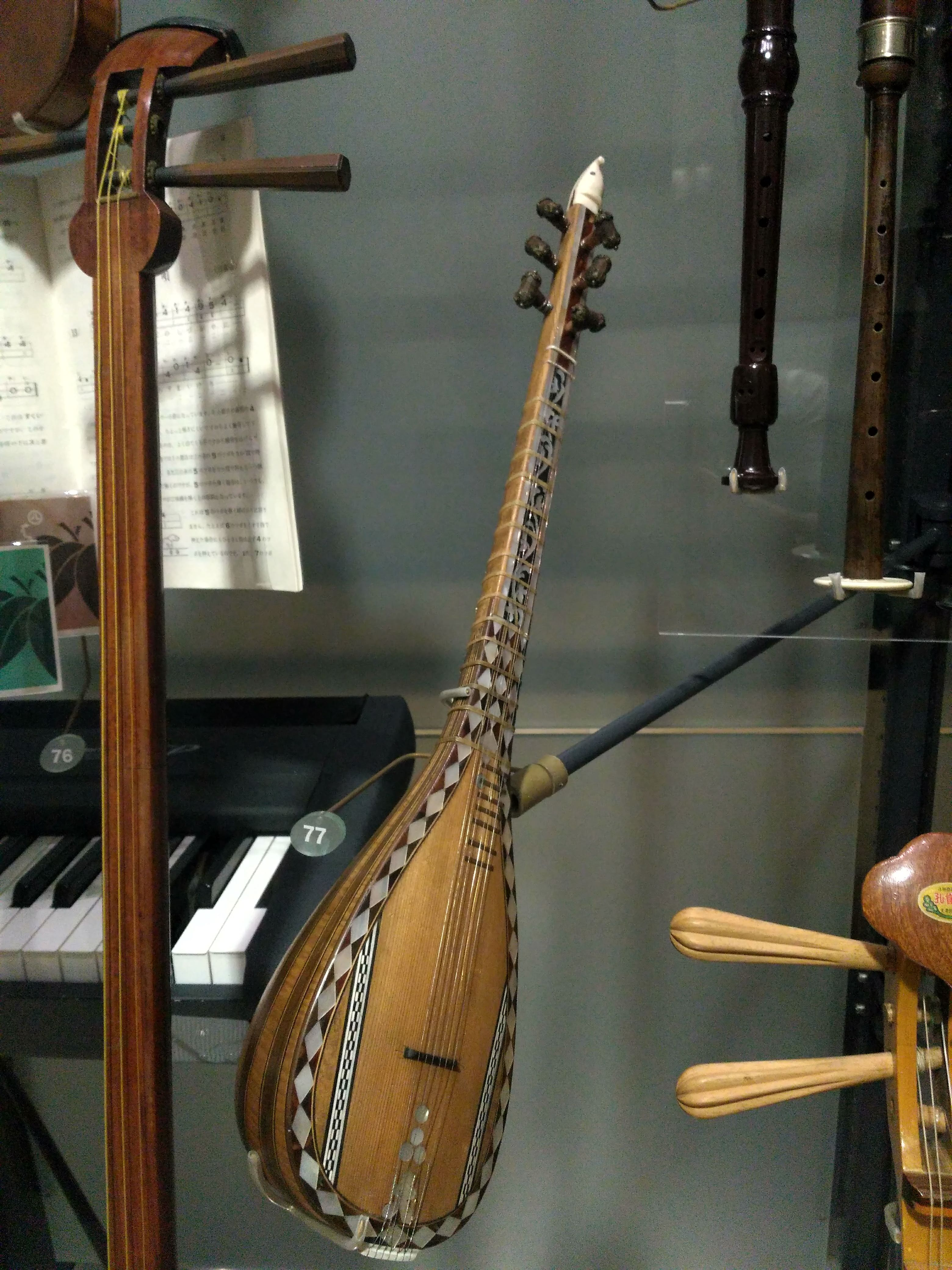
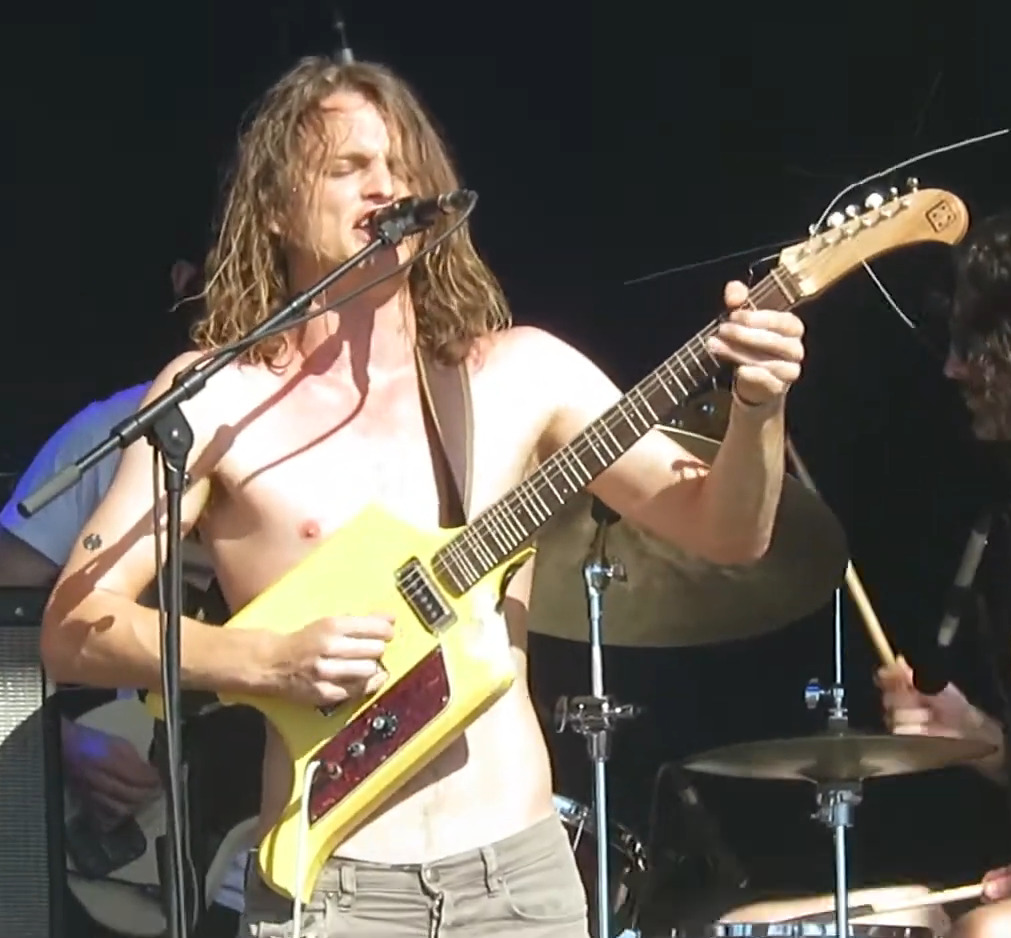
King Gizzard's microtonal music was in part inspired by the bağlama (left).

Unusual in Western rock music, starting in 2017 with album Flying Microtonal Banana, the band have experimented with microtonal music using custom built guitars in 24 TET tuning, as well as several other modified instruments. This was inspired by Middle Eastern and Turkish music, including Anatolian rock, and their customised guitars were modelled off the bağlama. Mackenzie described it as "kind of a Dorian mode with a half flat sixth and a half flat second, because that was the way my baglama was fretted". After Flying Microtonal Banana, the band went on to create two more albums utilising this scale – K.G. and L.W. – while also utilising it in other one-off songs. Many of the band's songs feature unusual time signatures, such as 7/8 and 5/4, and frequent time signature changes. Their albums Polygondwanaland and Butterfly 3000 feature polyrhythms and polymeters.

=== "Gizzverse" ===
Many of the band's releases are based on a unique concept yet share lyrical themes and feature characters that form a recurring cast, one of the most frequent being Han-Tyumi, a "confused cyborg" who appears across multiple albums and whose name, according to cultural theorist Benjamin Kirbach, represents "a vaguely nipponized anagram of 'humanity'". Their songs also tell stories of "gamblers, cowboys, Australian Rules footballers, people-vultures, Balrogs, lightning gods, flesh-eating beasts, sages and space-faring eco rebels". Members of r/KGATLW, a subreddit dedicated to the band, popularised the term "Gizzverse" to describe the overarching narrative of their discography, about which many theories have been propagated. In a 2017 interview, Stu Mackenzie confirmed that the band's releases are all connected, saying, "They all exist in this parallel universe and they may be from different times and different places but they all can co-exist in a meaningful way". In the same interview, drummer Eric Moore joked that even prior to the band's formation, they decided how the story will end.

The band's lyrics often feature environmental themes, meditating on topics such as the collapse of civilisation and climate change, particularly on the albums Infest the Rats' Nest, Flying Microtonal Banana, Fishing for Fishies, K.G. and L.W.. Mackenzie has said: "We've got a lot of things to fear... I spend a lot of time thinking about the future of humanity and the future of Planet Earth. Naturally these thoughts seep into the lyrics". Kirbach writes further that King Gizzard is:

nothing if not an apocalyptic band. Having released [twenty-six] studio albums to date since 2010, their frenzied pace evokes less LSD-inspired free love perhaps than Adderall-infused twenty-first-century despair. Their pervasive themes of climate change and the ills of technology position them as a band truly at the end of the world. And they are often as prophetic as they are prolific. Indeed, their thrash metal sci-fi epic Infest the Rats' Nest includes a song about a global pandemic which sparks a working-class revolution (the album was released in 2019, a scant six months before COVID). Yet the tension between human and technology in King Gizzard’s œuvre is rarely presented as a clichéd Fall of Man, as if romanticizing some idyllic pre-technological past. The relationship is instead portrayed as cyclic and reciprocal.

The band's lyrical themes also address political and social issues, with Walker saying: "We try not to be too didactic in how we go about it, though there probably are times where it [could] be. We try to bury it in metaphor and other shit". "Minimum Brain Size" on K.G. was written following the Christchurch mosque shootings.

== Band members ==
Current members

- Stu Mackenzie – vocals, guitars, keyboards, flute, bass guitar, percussion, sitar, piano, organ, violin, clarinet, saxophone, zurna, drums (2010–present)
- Joey Walker – guitars, vocals, bass guitar, keyboards, piano, setar, percussion (2010–present)
- Lucas Harwood – bass guitar, piano, keyboards, percussion, vocals (2010–present)
- Michael "Cavs" Cavanagh – drums, percussion, vocals, (2010–present)
- Ambrose Kenny-Smith – vocals, harmonicas, keyboards, percussion, piano, saxophone, guitar, organ (2011–present)
- Cook Craig – guitars, bass guitar, piano, keyboards, percussion, vocals (2011–present)

Former members

- Eric Moore – drums, management, theremin, keyboards, percussion, vocals (2010–2020)

=== Timeline ===
Sound & Art Crew

- Jason Galea – visuals, artwork, layouts
- Sam Joseph – live show sound engineering, pedal steel guitar on Flight b741 and Phantom Island
- Gaspard de Meulemeester – live show sound engineering
- Joe Santarpia – live show sound engineering
- Grace Reader – live show sound engineering
- Jamie Wdziekonski – photographer, visuals
- John Angus Stewart – visuals

Musical Collaborators

- Broderick Smith – father of harmonicist & co-lead singer Ambrose Kenny-Smith, narration, writing and co-creator of Eyes Like the Sky, guest narration on "Sam Cherry's Last Shot" for 12 Bar Bruise.
- Leah Senior – Australian folk musician & former Flightless cohort, narration for chapters 1 and 2 of Murder of the Universe, guest narration on "The Castle in the Air" for Polygondwanaland & "Dawn Of Eternal Night" for PetroDragonic Apocalypse.
- Alexander Brettin – member & bandleader of American jazz-psych group Mild High Club, co-creator of Sketches of Brunswick East and remixed "Butterfly 3000" for Butterfly 3001.
- Tropical Fuck Storm – Melbourne noise rock band, former Flightless cohorts, co-recorded the "Hat Jam" and Satanic Slumber Party, and released the latter alongside "The Dripping Tap" in the Hat Jam vinyl release.

== Discography ==
- 12 Bar Bruise (2012)
- Eyes Like the Sky (with Broderick Smith, 2013)
- Float Along – Fill Your Lungs (2013)
- Oddments (2014)
- I'm in Your Mind Fuzz (2014)
- Quarters! (2015)
- Paper Mâché Dream Balloon (2015)
- Nonagon Infinity (2016)
- Flying Microtonal Banana (2017)
- Murder of the Universe (ft. Leah Senior, 2017)
- Sketches of Brunswick East (with Mild High Club, 2017)
- Polygondwanaland (2017)
- Gumboot Soup (2017)
- Fishing for Fishies (2019)
- Infest the Rats' Nest (2019)
- K.G. (2020)
- L.W. (2021)
- Butterfly 3000 (2021)
- Made in Timeland (2022)
- Omnium Gatherum (2022)
- Ice, Death, Planets, Lungs, Mushrooms and Lava (2022)
- Laminated Denim (2022)
- Changes (2022)
- PetroDragonic Apocalypse; or, Dawn of Eternal Night: An Annihilation of Planet Earth and the Beginning of Merciless Damnation (2023)
- The Silver Cord (2023)
- Flight b741 (2024)
- Phantom Island (2025)
- Alien Metal (2026)
- Entropy (2026)

== Labels ==
=== Flightless ===
Early in the band's life in 2012, manager Eric Moore made an independent record label named Flightless to release the band's music after failing to secure a contract with a mainstream label. In 2018, Flightless formed a distribution partnership with ATO Records. The following year, the label opened Flightless 168, a public record store located on Lygon Street in the Melbourne suburb of Brunswick East. Flightless also signed the Murlocs, Stonefield, Orb, The Babe Rainbow, Tropical Fuck Storm and Amyl and the Sniffers to their label. After Moore left the band in 2020 King Gizzard & the Lizard Wizard pulled out of Flightless, along with most other acts. The first fifteen albums by King Gizzard & the Lizard Wizard, alongside L.W. were released under Flightless.

=== KGLW ===
After departing from Flightless, the band independently released their music under the KGLW label. With the exceptions of a split with Tropical Fuck Storm and Butterfly 3001, KGLW was limited to just King Gizzard & the Lizard Wizard content. Every King Gizzard album from K.G. to The Silver Cord released under KGLW, except for regional variants of K.G., L.W., and Made in Timeland. On release, K.G. and L.W. were pressed by Flightless in Australia, and Made in Timeland was pressed by Flightless in Australia and ATO in the United States.

=== p(doom) ===
p(doom)
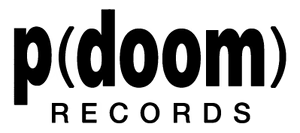
- Founded: 2024
- Distributors: Universal Music Group; ATO Records (reissues of albums previously released on ATO)
- Country of origin: Australia
- Official website: pdoomrecords.com

Early in 2024, King Gizzard & the Lizard Wizard merged their online merch store, Gizzverse.com, and KGLW into a new record label named p(doom) in reference to the artificial intelligence concept P(doom). Shortly after its creation the band announced that unlike KGLW, p(doom) will also release other bands' music. In October of 2025, it was announced that Jay Watson, founding member of Pond and touring member of Tame Impala, who releases solo work under the name GUM and released the collaborative album Ill Times with Ambrose Kenny-Smith in 2024 through the label, had signed to p(doom); alongside this announcement, he released his first solo single in over two years, "Expanding Blue", via the label. On 6 March 2026, Watson released his seventh GUM album, Blue Gum Way, through the label.

In June 2026, the Australian punk rock band C.O.F.F.I.N signed to p(doom).

List of releases
No.	Band	Release	Notes
PDOOM-001	GUM/Ambrose Kenny-Smith	Ill Times	Original release
PDOOM-002	King Gizzard and the Lizard Wizard	Set / Gilgamesh	7" single
PDOOM-003	Jason Galea	King Gizzard & The Lizard Wizard Posters Vol 1	Hardcover artbook
PDOOM-004	King Gizzard and the Lizard Wizard	Flight b741	Both CD and LP
PDOOM-005	King Gizzard and the Lizard Wizard	Raw Feel / Flight b741	7" single
PDOOM-006	King Gizzard and the Lizard Wizard	Antarctica / Sad Pilot	7" single
PDOOM-007	Pipe-eye	Pipe-defy	LP
PDOOM-008	Heavy Moss	Dead Slow	LP and deluxe edition
PDOOM-009	GUM/Ambrose Kenny-Smith	Ill Times	Deluxe edition
PDOOM-010	Babe Rainbow	Slipper Imp & Shakaerator	LP
PDOOM-011	King Gizzard and the Lizard Wizard	Phantom Island	LP and deluxe edition
PDOOM-012	Memo PST	Puzzle Piece / Killed By A Loser	7" Single
PDOOM-013	Various Artists	Field Of Vision 2025	Compilation LP
PDOOM-014	The Mystery Lights	Kids of Today / Wish You Unwell	7" Single
PDOOM-015 is unknown
PDOOM-016 is unknown
PDOOM-017	Gum	Blue Gum Way	LP
PDOOM-018	CAVS	Sojourn	LP
PDOOM-022	King Gizzard and the Lizard Wizard	Alien Metal	LP & CD

== Awards and nominations ==
List of awards and nominations received by King Gizzard & the Lizard Wizard, sorted by awards ceremony
Ceremony	Year	Nominee / work	Award	Result	Ref.
AIM Independent Music Awards	2017	King Gizzard & the Lizard Wizard	Hardest Working Group or Artist	Nominated	
AIM Independent Music Awards	2018	King Gizzard & the Lizard Wizard	Hardest Working Group or Artist	Nominated	
AIM Independent Music Awards	2021	Eco Wax Editions	Best Creative Packaging	Nominated	
AIR Awards	2013	12 Bar Bruise	Best Independent Hard Rock or Punk Album	Won	
AIR Awards	2013	King Gizzard & the Lizard Wizard	Carlton Dry Global Music Grant	Won	
AIR Awards	2014	Oddments	Best Independent Hard Rock or Punk Album	Nominated	
AIR Awards	2015	I'm in Your Mind Fuzz	Best Independent Hard Rock or Punk Album	Won	
AIR Awards	2018	Murder of the Universe	Best Independent Hard Rock or Punk Album	Won	
APRA Awards	2015	"Cellophane" (Stuart Mackenzie)	Song of the Year	Shortlisted	
APRA Awards	2017	"Gamma Knife" (Mackenzie)	Song of the Year	Shortlisted	
APRA Awards	2018	"Sleep Drifter" (Mackenzie)	Song of the Year	Shortlisted	
APRA Awards	2019	"Greenhouse Heat Death" (Mackenzie)	Song of the Year	Shortlisted	
APRA Awards	2020	"Self-Immolate" (MacKenzie, Michael Cavanagh, Joseph Walker)	Song of the Year	Shortlisted	
APRA Awards	2023	"Magenta Mountain"	Song of the Year	Shortlisted	
APRA Awards	2024	"Gila Monster"	Song of the Year	Shortlisted	
APRA Awards	2024	"Dragon"	Most Performed Hard Rock / Heavy Metal Work	Nominated	
APRA Awards	2026	"Phantom Island"	Song of the Year	Shortlisted	
ARIA Music Awards	2015	Quarters!	Best Jazz Album	Nominated	
ARIA Music Awards	2016	Nonagon Infinity	Best Group	Nominated	
ARIA Music Awards	2016	Nonagon Infinity	Best Independent Release	Nominated	
ARIA Music Awards	2016	Nonagon Infinity	Best Hard Rock/Heavy Metal Album	Won	
ARIA Music Awards	2016	Nonagan Infinity Tour	Best Australian Live Act	Nominated	
ARIA Music Awards	2016	(Danny Cohen & Jason Galea for) King Gizzard & the Lizard Wizard – "People-Vultures"	Best Video	Nominated	
ARIA Music Awards	2017	Flying Microtonal Banana	Best Group	Nominated	
ARIA Music Awards	2017	Murder of the Universe	Best Hard Rock/Heavy Metal Album	Nominated	
ARIA Music Awards	2017	The Lizard Wizard Gizzfest	Best Australian Live Act	Nominated	
ARIA Music Awards	2017	Sketches of Brunswick East	Best Jazz Album	Nominated	
ARIA Music Awards	2019	Infest the Rats' Nest	Best Hard Rock/Heavy Metal Album	Nominated	
ARIA Music Awards	2019	Fishing for Fishies	Best Blues & Roots Album	Nominated	
ARIA Music Awards	2019	King Gizzard & the Lizard Wizard Australian Tour 2019	Best Australian Live Act	Nominated	
ARIA Music Awards	2020	Chunky Shrapnel	Best Hard Rock/Heavy Metal Album	Won	
ARIA Music Awards	2020	St Jerome's Laneway Festival	Best Australian Live Act	Nominated	
ARIA Music Awards	2021	Micro Tour	Best Australian Live Act	Nominated	
ARIA Music Awards	2023	PetroDragonic Apocalypse; or, Dawn of Eternal Night: An Annihilation of Planet Earth…	Best Group	Nominated	
ARIA Music Awards	2023	PetroDragonic Apocalypse; or, Dawn of Eternal Night: An Annihilation of Planet Earth…	Best Hard Rock/Heavy Metal Album	Nominated	
ARIA Music Awards	2023	Ice, Death, Planets, Lungs, Mushrooms and Lava	Best Rock Album	Won	
ARIA Music Awards	2023	Spod for King Gizzard & the Lizard Wizard – "Gila Monster"	Best Video	Nominated	
ARIA Music Awards	2024	Flight b741	Best Rock Album	Nominated	
ARIA Music Awards	2026	Phantom Island Australia Tour	Best Australian Live Act	Nominated	
Australian Music Prize	2016	Nonagon Infinity	Australian Music Prize	Nominated	
Australian Music Prize	2021	Butterfly 3000	Australian Music Prize	Nominated	
Environmental Music Prize	2022	If Not Now, Then When?	Environmental Music Award	Won	
J Awards	2014	I'm in Your Mind Fuzz	Australian Album of the Year	Nominated	
J Awards	2014	"Hot Wax"	Australian Video of the Year	Nominated	
J Awards	2016	King Gizzard & the Lizard Wizard	Double J Act of the Year	Won	
J Awards	2016	"People Vultures"	Australian Video of the Year	Won	
J Awards	2019	King Gizzard & the Lizard Wizard	Double J Act of the Year	Nominated	
J Awards	2023	King Gizzard & the Lizard Wizard	Australian Live Act of the Year	Nominated	
Libera Awards	2019	King Gizzard & the Lizard Wizard	Best Live Act	Nominated	
Libera Awards	2019	Reissues Campaign	Marketing Genius	Nominated	
Libera Awards	2020	Infest the Rats' Nest	Best Metal Album	Won	
Libera Awards	2020	Fishing for Fishies	Best Outlier Record	Nominated	
Libera Awards	2022	Official Bootlegger Series	Marketing Genius	Nominated	
Music Victoria Awards	2012	King Gizzard & the Lizard Wizard	Best New Talent	Nominated	
Music Victoria Awards	2013	King Gizzard & the Lizard Wizard	Best Band	Nominated	
Music Victoria Awards	2013	"Head On/Pill"	Best Song	Nominated	
Music Victoria Awards	2014	King Gizzard & the Lizard Wizard	Best Band	Won	
Music Victoria Awards	2014	Oddments	Best Album	Nominated	
Music Victoria Awards	2015	King Gizzard & the Lizard Wizard	Best Band	Nominated	
Music Victoria Awards	2016	King Gizzard & the Lizard Wizard	Best Band	Won	
Music Victoria Awards	2016	King Gizzard & the Lizard Wizard	Best Live Band	Won	
Music Victoria Awards	2016	Nonagon Infinity	Best Album	Won	
Music Victoria Awards	2017	King Gizzard & the Lizard Wizard	Best Band	Won	
Music Victoria Awards	2017	King Gizzard & the Lizard Wizard	Best Live Act	Won	
Music Victoria Awards	2017	"Rattlesnake"	Best Song	Won	
Music Victoria Awards	2018	King Gizzard & the Lizard Wizard	Best Band	Nominated	
Music Victoria Awards	2018	King Gizzard & the Lizard Wizard	Best Live Act	Nominated	
Music Victoria Awards	2019	King Gizzard & the Lizard Wizard	Best Band	Nominated	
Music Victoria Awards	2019	King Gizzard & the Lizard Wizard	Best Live Act	Won	
Music Victoria Awards	2019	Stu Mackenzie (King Gizzard & the Lizard Wizard)	Best Male Musician	Nominated	
Music Victoria Awards	2020	King Gizzard & the Lizard Wizard	Best Band	Nominated	
Music Victoria Awards	2020	Stu Mackenzie (King Gizzard & the Lizard Wizard)	Best Musician	Nominated	
Music Victoria Awards	2021	King Gizzard & the Lizard Wizard	Best Group	Nominated	
Music Victoria Awards	2021	Stu Mackenzie (King Gizzard & the Lizard Wizard)	Best Musician	Nominated	
Music Victoria Awards	2022	King Gizzard & the Lizard Wizard	Best Rock/Punk Work	Nominated	
National Live Music Awards	2016	King Gizzard & the Lizard Wizard	Live Act of the Year	Nominated	
National Live Music Awards	2016	King Gizzard & the Lizard Wizard	International Live Achievement (Group)	Nominated	
National Live Music Awards	2016	King Gizzard & the Lizard Wizard	Victorian Live Act of the Year	Nominated	
National Live Music Awards	2017	King Gizzard & the Lizard Wizard	International Live Achievement (Group)	Won	
National Live Music Awards	2017	King Gizzard & the Lizard Wizard	People's Choice – Live Act of the Year	Nominated	
National Live Music Awards	2020	Stu Mackenzie (King Gizzard & the Lizard Wizard)	Live Guitarist of the Year	Won	
National Live Music Awards	2023	King Gizzard & the Lizard Wizard	Best Live Act	Nominated	
National Live Music Awards	2023	King Gizzard & the Lizard Wizard	Best Indie/Rock/Alternative Act	Nominated	
National Live Music Awards	2023	King Gizzard & the Lizard Wizard	Best Live Act in Victoria	Nominated	
National Live Music Awards	2023	Lucas Harwood (King Gizzard & the Lizard Wizard)	Best Live Bassist	Nominated	
National Live Music Awards	2023	Michael Cavanagh (King Gizzard & the Lizard Wizard)	Best Live Drummer	Nominated	
National Live Music Awards	2023	Joey Walker (King Gizzard & the Lizard Wizard)	Best Live Guitarist	Won	

== See also ==
- List of songs recorded by King Gizzard and the Lizard Wizard
