= Live in Sydney '21 =

Live album by King Gizzard & the Lizard Wizard
- Released: 29 May 2021
- Recorded: 22 April 2021
- Venue: The Enmore Theatre, Sydney, Australia
- Genre: Psychedelic rock; thrash rock
- Length: 89:27
- Label: Self-released; Various
- Producer: Stu Mackenzie

King Gizzard & the Lizard Wizard chronology
Live in Melbourne '21 (2021)	Live in Sydney '21 (2021)	Butterfly 3000 (2021)

Music video
- "Live in Sydney'21" on YouTube

Live in Sydney '21 is a live album by Australian psychedelic rock band King Gizzard & the Lizard Wizard of their performance at the Enmore Theatre near Sydney. The performance occurred shortly after the release of L.W. and the band's return to touring after the COVID-19 pandemic, with the release taking place shortly before the release of Butterfly 3000.

== Recordings ==
Due to the proximity to the release of L.W., the entire set list consists of the band's microtonal music including some rarely played songs from Sketches of Brunswick East. This performance was also one of the first after the departure of their second drummer, Eric Moore. The performance was recorded and released on YouTube and Bandcamp as part of the band's official bootlegger program. King Gizzard had greatly expanded their Bootlegger program during the COVID pandemic so their fans can have continued content and to make up for cancelled shows. Body Type opened for the show, with the release of the show's recording being part of a promotion announcing a new slate of concerts across Australia.

== Reception ==
The performance was described as having "great tones and exciting overdrive" with specific praise for the guitar work.

== Track listing ==
The albums was recorded by Nico Wilson, Bonnie Knight, and Sam Joseph and mixed by Stu Mackenzie. The cover art is a photo of Stu playing the "Flying Microtonal Banana", the namesake guitar of their first Microtonal album, during the performance taken by Zachary Williams, with a trim around the edges added by Jason Galea.

No.	Title	Length
1.	"If Not Now, Then When?"	5:27
2.	"Oddlife"	5:33
3.	"Nuclear Fusion"	5:22
4.	"Ataraxia"	5:36
5.	"Open Water"	5:29
6.	"Anoxia"	4:03
7.	"Melting"	6:21
8.	"Straws in the Wind"	10:09
9.	"The Book"	6:51
10.	"Automation"	3:18
11.	"D-Day"	1:27
12.	"Some of Us"	3:56
13.	"Supreme Ascendancy"	4:27
14.	"See Me"	4:33
15.	"The Hungry Wolf Of Fate"	5:47
16.	"K.G.L.W."	11:08
Total length:		1:29:27

== Personnel ==
King Gizzard & The Lizard Wizard

- Stu Mackenzie – guitar, vocals, mixing
- Cook Craig – guitar, keys
- Joey Walker – guitar, vocals
- Ambrose Kenny-Smith – harmonica, keyboards, vocals, percussion, guitar
- Lucas Harwood – bass
- Michael Cavanagh – drums

Production

- Nico Wilson – recording engineer
- Bonnie Knight – recording engineer
- Sam Joseph – recording engineer
- Jason Galea – design and layout
- Zachary Williams – cover photography
