= Demos Vol. 3 + Vol. 4 =

Compilation album by King Gizzard & the Lizard Wizard
- Released: 15 July 2022
- Recorded: 2011–2021
- Genre: Psychedelic rock; garage rock
- Length: 90:31
- Label: Self-released; Various
- Producer: Stu Mackenzie

King Gizzard & the Lizard Wizard chronology
Omnium Gatherum (2022)	Demos Vol. 3 + Vol. 4 (2022)	Ice, Death, Planets, Lungs, Mushrooms and Lava (2022)

Demos Vol. 3 + Vol. 4 is a compilation album released by King Gizzard & the Lizard Wizard on 15 July 2022, exclusively through Bandcamp and vinyl. It compiles demos and unreleased tracks ranging from the band's entire career. It was originally released as two separate albums (Vol. 3 Music to Eat Pond Scum To and Vol. 4 Music to Die To) but was eventually compiled into one.

== Recordings ==
Vol. 3 contains demos from Butterfly 3000, Gumboot Soup, Infest the Rats' Nest, K.G., Omnium Gatherum, and Willoughby's Beach. Vol. 4 contains demos from Flying Microtonal Banana, Murder of the Universe, Fishing for Fishies, Omnium Gatherum, and Nonagon Infinity. Both volumes also contain abandoned concepts that where never turned into full songs. The albums were released during a break between legs of the band's 2022 European tour, although the final leg was cancelled so that Stu Mackenzie could return to Australia for treatment of his Crohn's disease.

== Track listing ==
Albums were mastered by Joseph Carra with cover art by Jason Galea.

Vol. 3 – Music to Eat Pond Scum To
No.	Title	Length
1.	"Music to Eat Pond Scum To"	2:14
2.	"All Is Known (Demo 1)"	3:13
3.	"Stoned Mullet (Demo)"	2:03
4.	"Greenhouse Heat Death (Demo 1)"	4:05
5.	"Party Potential"	2:37
6.	"Gaia (Demo)"	3:30
7.	"German Rock n' Rolle"	3:31
8.	"Sleep Drifter (Demo 1)"	2:18
9.	"Mariposa"	0:16
10.	"Mars for the Rich (Demo 2)"	3:46
11.	"The Hungry Wolf of Fate (Demo 1)"	4:07
12.	"Flying Fishie"	5:36
13.	"The Dripping Tap (Demo 1)"	8:20
Total length:		45:36

Vol. 4 – Music to Die To
No.	Title	Length
1.	"Music to Die To"	2:29
2.	"Sleep Drifter (Demo 2)"	7:14
3.	"Converge (Note: Under the name "Uncolonize" was initially supposed to be on Infest the Rats Nest but would eventually be renamed and added to PetroDragonic Apocalypse) (Demo)"	2:37
4.	"Altered Beast I (Demo)"	2:41
5.	"Worm"	1:46
6.	"The Bird Song (Demo 2)"	3:05
7.	"Kelebek"	0:21
8.	"Predator X (Demo)"	2:41
9.	"Tea and Jam"	1:48
10.	"Big Fig Wasp (Demo)"	3:45
11.	"Cookies"	0:53
12.	"The Mother Hen"	3:18
13.	"The Dripping Tap (Demo 2)"	12:17
Total length:		44:55
