= Live in Melbourne '21 =

Live album by King Gizzard & the Lizard Wizard
- Released: 19 March 2021
- Recorded: 26 February 2021
- Venue: The Princess Theatre, Brisbane, Australia
- Genre: Psychedelic rock; thrash rock
- Length: 88:51
- Label: Self-released; Various
- Producer: Stu Mackenzie

King Gizzard & the Lizard Wizard chronology
L.W. (2021)	Live in Melbourne '21 (2021)	Live in Sydney '21 (2021)

Music video
- "Live in Melbourne '21" on YouTube

Live in Melbourne '21 is a live album released by Australian rock band King Gizzard and the Lizard Wizard, recorded during their performance in the Summer Sound Festival at the Sidney Myer Music Bowl on 26 February 2021.

== Recordings ==
Live in Melbourne '21 contains the rare intro drum solo Fury, played only twice in the bands existence, here, and at a show at the Croxton Park Hotel 2 days prior. The performance took place during a gap between the release of K.G. and L.W., and heavily featured songs on that album. It was also the bands first recorded live performance since the COVID-19 pandemic, and the departure of Eric Moore. This release was also made available on YouTube by the band with concert footage with the album uploaded to their official bootlegger program shortly after.

== Reception ==
The Australian Broadcasting Corporation noted the performances of "Pleura," "Straws in the Wind," "Automation," and "Honey." The release of the album also came with the release of further concert dates in Sydney, Adelaide, and Fremantle.

== Track listing ==
The albums was recorded by Nico Wilson and Sam Joseph, mixed by Stu Mackenzie, with cover art by Jason Galea.

Live in Melbourne '21
No.	Title	Length
1.	"Fury"	2:26
2.	"K.G.L.W. (Intro)"	1:44
3.	"Oddlife"	4:57
4.	"Doom City"	3:19
5.	"O.N.E."	3:29
6.	"Ontology"	4:45
7.	"Rattlesnake"	6:12
8.	"East West Link"	3:45
9.	"Static Electricity"	5:57
10.	"All Is Known"	4:37
11.	"Pleura"	4:25
12.	"Straws in the Wind"	8:37
13.	"Billabong Valley"	6:39
14.	"Automation"	3:39
15.	"Minimum Brain Size"	4:07
16.	"Sleep Drifter"	5:20
17.	"Honey"	5:22
18.	"K.G.L.W. (Outro)"	9:31
Total length:		1:28:51

== Personnel ==
King Gizzard & The Lizard Wizard

- Stu Mackenzie – guitar, vocals, mixing
- Cook Craig – guitar, keys
- Joey Walker – guitar, vocals
- Ambrose Kenny-Smith – harmonica, keyboards, vocals, percussion, guitar
- Lucas Harwood – bass
- Michael Cavanagh – drums

Production

- Sam Joseph – recording
- Nico Wilson – recording
- Toby Brandon – recording
- Jason Galea – cover art
