= Live at Levitation '16 =

Live album by King Gizzard & the Lizard Wizard
- Released: 10 December 2021
- Recorded: 1 May 2016
- Genre: Psychedelic rock; thrash rock
- Length: 57:20
- Label: Self-released; Various
- Producer: Stu Mackenzie

King Gizzard & the Lizard Wizard chronology
| Live at Levitation '14 (2021) | Live at Levitation '16 (2021) | Butterfly 3001 (2022) |

Live at Levitation '16 is a live album released by Australian rock band King Gizzard and the Lizard Wizard, of their performance at Levitation, a music festival at Carson Creek Ranch, Austin, Texas. The album was released alongside Live at Levitation '14 in December 2021 between the studio album Butterfly 3000 and its remix album Butterfly 3001.

== Recordings ==
Although the festival itself would be canceled due to severe weather, since King Gizzard had already traveled to Austin they decided to press ahead with the show at a venue named the Barracuda, and perform anyways. King Gizzard mostly performed songs from the still unreleased Nonagon Infinity as part of a build up towards the album's release.

== Release ==
The album would also be released for free on as part of the band's official Bootlegger program. As such, the album was released by various labels around the world, including The Reverberation Appreciation Society, who also operates the Levitation festival. Upon its release, the magazine Tinnitist noted that the band was "firing on all cylniders."

== Track listing ==
Live at Levitation '16 track listing
| No. | Title | Length |
|---|---|---|
| 1. | "Robot Stop" | 4:12 |
| 2. | "Hot Water" | 4:53 |
| 3. | "Trapdoor" | 3:15 |
| 4. | "I'm in Your Mind" | 3:18 |
| 5. | "I'm Not in Your Mind" | 2:56 |
| 6. | "Cellophane" | 3:19 |
| 7. | "I'm in Your Mind Fuzz" | 3:26 |
| 8. | "Gamma Knife" | 3:55 |
| 9. | "People-Vultures" | 5:45 |
| 10. | "The River" | 10:40 |
| 11. | "Evil Death Roll" | 8:42 |
| 12. | "Cut Throat Boogie" | 2:59 |
| Total length: | | 57:20 |

== Personnel ==
- Stu Mackenzie – lead vocals, guitar, flute
- Ambrose Kenny-Smith- vocals, harmonica, keyboards
- Joey Walker - guitar, vocals
- Cook Craig - guitar, keyboards, bass
- Lucas Harwood - bass
- Michael Cavanagh - drums
- Eric Moore - drums

=== Technical ===
Sources:

- Stu Mackenzie - mixing
- Joe Carra - mastering
- Alan Forbes - cover art
