= Live at Levitation '14 =

Live album by King Gizzard & the Lizard Wizard
- Released: 10 December 2021
- Recorded: 2 May 2014
- Genre: Psychedelic rock
- Length: 43:58
- Label: Self-released; Various
- Producer: Stu Mackenzie

King Gizzard & the Lizard Wizard chronology
Live in Milwaukee '19 (2021)	Live at Levitation '14 (2021)	Live at Levitation '16 (2021)

Live at Levitation '14 is a live album released by Australian rock band King Gizzard and the Lizard Wizard, of their performance at Levitation on 2 May 2014, a music festival at Carson Creek Ranch, Austin, Texas. The album was released alongside Live at Levitation '16 on 10 December 2021, between the studio album Butterfly 3000 and its remix album Butterfly 3001.

== Recordings ==
King Gizzard's performance at the 2014 Levitation festival marked the first time the band performed a live show in the United States. At the time the band was still a total unknown in the United States, with only an estimated 125 fans in attendance, mostly there for other acts. Regardless, the show would create a burgeoning fan-base. The band was promoting their new, then unreleased, album I'm in Your Mind Fuzz. Among the performance was the rarely played Wholly Ghost, (Note: The Wholly Ghost was released as the b-side to the single Cellophane which itself had a limited and highly coveted UK-only pressing, the song was never included in any full album) with this live album being the only US digital publication of that song. Shortly after this performance King Gizzard would travel to Brooklyn to record I'm in Your Mind Fuzz.

== Reception ==
4 versions of limited editions of LP vinyls of the album where released by The Reverberation Appreciation Society which runs the Levitation festival. Additionally the albums came out shortly before the beginning of their World Tour 2022. Live for Live Music noted the performance of the Mind Fuzz Suite (I'm In Your Mind-I'm Not In Your Mind-Cellophane-I'm In Your Mind Fuzz-Wholly Ghost) and the lengthy rendition of Head On/Pill at the end. The album would also be released for free on as part of the band's official Bootlegger program.

== Track listing ==
The albums were mastered by Joe Carra and mixed by Stu Mackenzie with cover art by C.M Ruiz.

Live at Levitation '14 track listing
No.	Title	Length
1.	"I'm in Your Mind"	3:41
2.	"I'm Not in Your Mind"	2:31
3.	"Cellophane"	3:12
4.	"I'm in Your Mind Fuzz"	2:46
5.	"The Wholly Ghost"	4:04
6.	"Sleepwalker"	4:26
7.	"Am I in Heaven?"	6:30
8.	"Head On/Pill"	16:48
Total length:		43:58

== Personnel ==
- Stu Mackenzie – lead vocals, guitar
- Ambrose Kenny-Smith – vocals, harmonica, keyboards
- Joey Walker – guitar, vocals
- Cook Craig – guitar, bass
- Lucas Harwood – bass
- Michael Cavanagh – drums
- Eric Moore – drums
