= All Is Known =

Single by King Gizzard & the Lizard Wizard

from the album Gumboot Soup
- Released: 13 December 2017
- Genre: Psychedelic rock
- Length: 3:35
- Label: Flightless; ATO
- Songwriter: Stu Mackenzie
- Producer: Stu Mackenzie

King Gizzard & the Lizard Wizard singles chronology
"Crumbling Castle" (2017)	"All Is Known" (2017)	"Beginner's Luck" (2017)

Music video
- "All Is Known" on YouTube

"All Is Known" is a single released by Australian psychedelic rock band King Gizzard & the Lizard Wizard. Released on 13 December 2017, the single would later be the ninth track on the album Gumboot Soup.

== Background ==
The songs demos had been included in Demos Vol. 3: Music to Eat Pond Scum To and Demos Vol. 6: Music to Burn Money To with the lyrics commenting on the threats humanity may face at the hands of artificial intelligence. (Note: This was before the mass introduction of AI, with the introduction of ChatGPT occurring five years later in 2022.) The song "Tetrachromacy" is referenced in the fourth verse. The song was played live on 19 March 2017, at a show at The Night Cat in Melbourne but with different lyrics.

== Recording ==
"All Is Known" was recorded at Flightless HQ and released as a single on 12 December 2017 alongside "Beginner's Luck". Two more singles from the album would also be released, "Greenhouse Heat Death", and "The Last Oasis". The song would go on to be included on the album Gumboot Soup.

== Reception ==
"All Is Known" has been a mainstay in the band's live catalogue, being included on Live in Paris '19, Live in Melbourne '21, Live at Red Rocks '22, Live in Kentucky '24, Live in New York City '24, Live in Chicago '24, Live in Oklahoma City '24, and Live in Barcelona '25.
