= Rattlesnake (King Gizzard & the Lizard Wizard song) =

Single by King Gizzard & the Lizard Wizard

from the album Flying Microtonal Banana
- Released: 11 November 2016
- Genre: Psychedelic rock; krautrock
- Length: 7:48
- Label: Flightless; Heavenly
- Songwriter: Stu Mackenzie
- Producer: Stu Mackenzie

King Gizzard & the Lizard Wizard singles chronology
"Mr. Beat" (2016)	"Rattlesnake" (2016)	"Nuclear Fusion" (2016)

Music video
- "Rattlesnake" on YouTube

"Rattlesnake" is a song by Australian rock band King Gizzard & the Lizard Wizard released in 2016 as the lead single from their ninth studio album, Flying Microtonal Banana. The song is notably the band's first full foray into microtonal music, which was previously only briefly utilized on "Robot Stop" from Nonagon Infinity. Microtonality would be explored in full on the rest of Flying Microtonal Banana and subsequent albums such as K.G. and L.W.

Although often considered an iconic song in the band's discography, and winning accolades like Song of the Year at the Music Victoria Awards of 2017, the song's repetition and length have made it polarizing.

== Composition ==
"Rattlesnake" is a psychedelic rock song with significant krautrock influence, described by Exclaim! as "chugging along for eight minutes of mostly the same chord and motorik drum beat".

In Pitchfork's review of Flying Microtonal Banana, the song is described as "powering through a fog of stormy synths, staccato guitar pricks, and the brain-scrambling squawks of a Turkish horn-type instrument known as a zurna".

== Reception ==
"Rattlesnake" has been considered a highlight of Flying Microtonal Banana as well as a highlight of the band's discography as a whole, having won Song of the Year at the Music Victoria Awards of 2017 as well as being considered one of the band's best songs by publications like Guitar World and Exclaim!

However, the song has been criticized for its length and repetition. In a mixed review of Flying Microtonal Banana in The Heights, "Rattlesnake" is said "to be going for a more artistic expression, but eight minutes of 'artistry' is not much fun to listen to".

== Personnel ==
Credits taken from Apple Music.

King Gizzard & the Lizard Wizard

- Stu Mackenzie – vocals, guitar, percussion, piano, Zurna
- Ambrose Kenny-Smith – harmonica
- Cook Craig – guitar
- Lucas Skinner – bass guitar
- Joey Walker – guitar
- Michael Cavanagh – drums
- Eric Moore – drums
