= Beginner's Luck =

Beginner's Luck may refer to:

- Beginner's luck, an expression
- Beginner's Luck (1935 film), an Our Gang short comedy film
- Beginner's Luck (2001 film), a British drama film
- "Beginner's Luck", a song by King Gizzard & the Lizard Wizard in Gumboot Soup
