= Vegemite (song) =

Single by King Gizzard & the Lizard Wizard

from the album Oddments
- Released: 17 January 2014
- Length: 2:45
- Label: Flightless
- Songwriter: Stu Mackenzie
- Producer: Stu Mackenzie

King Gizzard & the Lizard Wizard singles chronology
| "Head On/Pill" (2013) | "Vegemite" (2014) | "Cellophane / The Wholly Ghost" (2014) |

Music video
- "Vegemite" on YouTube

"Vegemite" is a single by the Australian psychedelic rock band King Gizzard and the Lizard Wizard released as a CD promotion for their album Oddments on 17 January 2014.

== Composition ==
The song is an ode to Vegemite, an Australian food spread known for its umami flavor. Stu Mackenzie stated that "I recorded Vegemite at my parents house in Anglesea on their out-of-tune-but-exactly-a-half-step-down piano. It's probably the most literal song I've ever written. I love Vegemite." He also stated that it was one of the easiest songs he ever wrote. Joey Walker, however, has gone on record stating Vegemite "tastes like human shit" and that the song was a "weak attempt at trying to get a sync on an ad" hinting that in their early years, King Gizzard was looking into making commercial jingles.

== Release ==
On 13 January 2014, a music video by Jason Galea, alongside a CD single, was released. The music video is Stu's face overlaid on vegemite on toast, akin to Annoying Orange. Vegemite was the only single from Oddments.

== Reception ==
"Vegemite" has been described as the "closest thing to a novelty song within the King Gizzard canon" and as a meme among King Gizzard fans. The song was played a handful of times on tour in 2014 before being largely retired from the band's repertoire. In a 2020 Reddit AMA, Michael Cavanagh stated that "Vegemite" was his least favorite song in the band's discography (the track includes no drums, and Cavanagh is the band's drummer). During a show on 22 May 2022, Stu joked about playing the song, which prompted the crowd to chant "Vegemite" with Joey responding "no one wants to hear that fuckin' song." However, by 2023 the band began teasing that they would play the song live, and during Live at The Gorge '24, when the band was forced to stop their show due to the stage's barricade breaking, Stu sang an a cappella version of Vegemite which ended up being included in the official track list for the show.
