= The Last Oasis =

Single by King Gizzard & the Lizard Wizard

from the album Gumboot Soup
- Released: 20 December 2017
- Genre: Psychedelic rock
- Length: 3:39
- Label: Flightless; ATO
- Songwriter: Stu Mackenzie
- Producer: Stu Mackenzie

King Gizzard & the Lizard Wizard singles chronology
"Greenhouse Heat Death" (2017)	"The Last Oasis" (2017)	"Rolling Stoned" (2018)

Music video
- "The Last Oasis" on YouTube

"The Last Oasis" is a song by Australian psychedelic rock band King Gizzard & the Lizard Wizard. Released as a single on 20 December 2017, the song was later included as the eighth track on the album Gumboot Soup.

== Background ==
The track follows someone trying to find water in a hot, desert world. The narrator sees a mirage and dubs it the last oasis. The track also has some references to outer space including name dropping Thomas Zurbuchen.

== Recording ==
The song was recorded at Flightless HQ and mixed by Michael Badger. The album was released on 20 December, 2017, alongside "Greenhouse Heat Death", which had debuted on radio on 19 December. Earlier, on 13 December, "All Is Known" and "Beginner's Luck" were released as singles. This was the last single to promote the new album, with Gumboot Soup being released on 31 December.

== Reception ==
Described as jazzy, the song has never been played live. The Australian Broadcasting Corporation described the track as "a blissful heatwave of melody and tropical keyboards". Exclaim! also described it as a "chilled-out psych-pop respite".
