= Fortress (1983 video game) =

1983 video game

- Developer: Iconographics
- Publisher: Strategic Simulations
- Designers: Jim Templeman; Patty Denbrook
- Platforms: Apple II, Atari 8-bit, Commodore 64
- Release: 1983: Apple II, Atari 8-bit 1984: C64
- Genre: Strategy

Fortress is a video game published by Strategic Simulations in 1983 for the Atari 8-bit computers and Apple II. It was written by Jim Templeman and Patty Denbrook. A Commodore 64 port followed in 1984.

== Gameplay ==
Atari 8-bit screenshot

Fortress is a game in which the goal is to be the player who finishes the game with the most territory.

The game takes place on a rectangular field, where two opposing players alternate turns. For each turn, a player can either build a new castle or reinforce an existing one. If a new castle is built, it appears with four flags in each cardinal direction showing its zone of control. Players must place their castles in a way so they control most of the playing field. Because the field is limited, after a few turns there is a conflict between the opposing players where the most powerful castle wins.

When playing against the computer, there are five opponents to choose from: "The Squire" (beginner), "Lord Maginot" (the master of defense who will parry the player's moves), "Genghis Khan" (aggressive and strong), "Sir Galahad" (valiant but inexperienced), and finally "Count Vauban" (the most difficult).

== Reception ==
Scorpia reviewed the game for Computer Gaming World, and stated that "Bottom Line: If you like strategy games, this is one you'll want to have!" In a review of the Atari 8-bit version for Antic, Edward Bever wrote, "Simple, fast, and well balanced, Fortress should appeal to anyone who enjoys a game that makes you think."

== Popular culture ==
Australian rock band King Gizzard & the Lizard Wizard used a modified version of the game's box art for the cover art of their 2014 album I'm In Your Mind Fuzz. After the album cover's designer, Jason Galea, discovered the original Fortress box art artist to be Louis Seakow, credit was given to Seakow on all versions of the album released after 2019.
