= Cellophane / The Wholly Ghost =

Single by King Gizzard & the Lizard Wizard

from the album I'm in Your Mind Fuzz
- A-side: "Cellophane"
- B-side: "The Wholly Ghost"
- Released: 4 September 2014
- Length: 6:22; 3:10 ("Cellophane"); 3:12 ("The Wholly Ghost")
- Label: Flightless
- Songwriter: Stu Mackenzie
- Producer: Stu Mackenzie

King Gizzard & the Lizard Wizard singles chronology
| "Vegemite" (2014) | "Cellophane / The Wholly Ghost" (2014) | "Slow Jam 1" (2015) |

Music video
- "Cellophane" on YouTube

"Cellophane / The Wholly Ghost" is a single released by Australian psychedelic rock band King Gizzard & the Lizard Wizard consisting of the songs "Cellophane" and "The Wholly Ghost". Generally one of the rarest pieces of King Gizzard physical media, the audio files for "Cellophane" would also be released for free as a MediaFire link on its music video.

== "Cellophane" ==
Still an underground band, King Gizzard was attempting to break out in the United States with their then-upcoming album I'm in Your Mind Fuzz, with "Cellophane" being released as a promotional single. "I'm in Your Mind" and "I'm Not in Your Mind" were also played live during promotional concerts, however, magazines such as the Back Seat Mafia noted that "Cellophane" was the standout. The single was also released alongside a music video directed by Jason Galea.

When discussing the song, frontman Stu Mackenzie was surprised that it became a favourite by fans, stating that the song began life as an extended transition between "I'm Not in Your Mind" and "I'm in Your Mind Fuzz". He also stated of the music video:

"That song kind of references 3D movies and it’s sort of a silly song, it’s light-hearted, so we thought we’d do something that suited it. It’s mostly [Jason]'s idea – he's done some 3D stuff in the past, but it’s a total collaboration and he’s the brain. He’s the talented one."

The song was recorded by Wayne Gordon at Daptone Records in Brooklyn and mixed by Michael Badger and Stu. The music video got compressed by YouTube with the band occasionally playing the uncompressed masters during concerts. The music video would be referenced in the music video for the single "Black Hot Soup" from Butterfly 3000 in 2019, and Stu would also go on to say that this was the funnest music video they made.

== "The Wholly Ghost" ==
"The Wholly Ghost" (sometimes listed as "The Wholly Ghost (Speeds Up)") remains one of King Gizzard's least performed songs, having only been played 10 times live, all in 2014 as part of the tour promoting the release of the album. The only US digital recording of the song is found on Live at Levitation '14 while the physical 7" vinyls only saw a very limited run in the United Kingdom by Castle Face Records. Initially sold for £6.99, the vinyl now regularly resells for $300+. When asked in a 2025 Reddit AMA why the single was removed from the final album Stu said he forgot why, but that it was a last minute decision, as the album had originally been mastered with "The Wholly Ghost", likely as track number 9, between "Slow Jam 1" and "Satan Speeds Up". "The Wholly Ghost" single is region locked to Australia; when asked why, Joey Walker said it was because the song "doesn't exist". The song would last appear in their 2016 film Bootleg Holiday from Hell, which partly recorded them playing it on tour in 2014. In 2020 during another Reddit AMA Stu stated "I reckon we'll hit wholly ghost again one day" but by 2023 he said he forgot how the lyrics go and it hasn't been played to date.

== Personnel ==
King Gizzard and the Lizard Wizard

- Stu Mackenzie – vocals, electric guitar
- Joey Walker – electric guitar, vocals
- Cook Craig – electric guitar
- Ambrose Kenny-Smith – harmonica
- Lucas Harwood – bass guitar
- Michael Cavanagh – drums, percussion
- Eric Moore – drums, percussion

Technical

- Stu Mackenzie – producer, additional mixing, additional recording
- Wayne Gordon – recording
- Michael Badger – mixing
- Joe Carra – mastering
- Jason Galea – art
