= Greenhouse Heat Death =

Single by King Gizzard & the Lizard Wizard

from the album Gumboot Soup
- Released: 19 December 2017
- Genre: Psychedelic rock
- Length: 3:14
- Label: Flightless; ATO
- Songwriter: Stu Mackenzie
- Producer: Stu Mackenzie

King Gizzard & the Lizard Wizard singles chronology
"Beginner's Luck" (2017)	"Greenhouse Heat Death" (2017)	"The Last Oasis" (2017)

Music video
- "Greenhouse Heat Death" on YouTube

"Greenhouse Heat Death" is a single released by Australian psychedelic rock band King Gizzard & the Lizard Wizard. Released on 19 December 2017, the single would later be the second track in the album Gumboot Soup.

== Background ==
A microtonal track with early synth work, "Greenhouse Heat Death" is a reference to the heat death of the universe, using food as metaphors for the greenhouse effect. A wholly electronic demo of the song was released on Demos Vol. 3: Music to Eat Pond Scum To alongside different lyrics and tempo. A second demo was released as a bonus for Nonagon Infinity that was likely recorded in 2016 during the sessions for Flying Microtonal Banana.

== Recording ==
The studio version was recorded at Rada Studios with additional work done at Flightless HQ, and was first played live at Whammy Bar in Auckland on 6 December 2017. Triple R radio began playing the song on 19 December, with the band officially releasing it as a single on 20 December alongside "The Last Oasis".

== Reception ==
The Australian Broadcasting Corporation described the song as "deep fried psych goodness" while also noting that it was likely a scrapped b-side from an earlier album, likely Flying Microtonal Banana. Stereogum described it as having "swirling riffs and doomy tones". The song would be played three times in early 2018 before it would disappear from the rotation of songs the band plays live.
