= Thomas Zurbuchen =

Swiss-American astrophysicist and NASA administrator

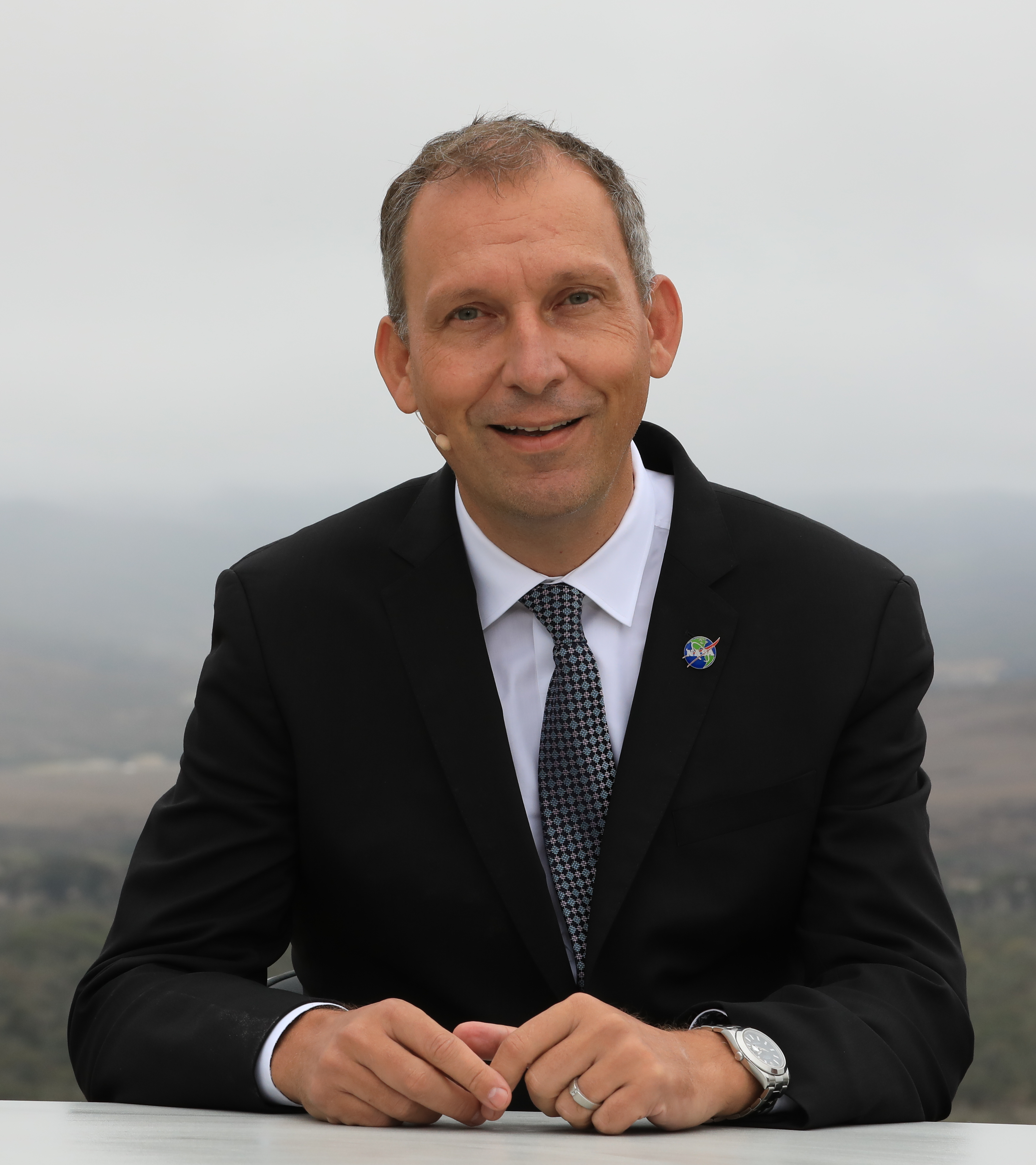
- Zurbuchen in 2021
- Born: 1968 (age 57–58); Heiligenschwendi, Canton of Bern, Switzerland
- Education: University of Bern
- Occupation: Government agency administrator
- Employer: ETH Zürich
- Known for: Associate Administrator, NASA (2016-2022)

Thomas Hansueli Zurbuchen (born 1968) is a Swiss-American astrophysicist. From October 2016 until the end of 2022, he was the longest continually running Associate Administrator for the Science Mission Directorate at NASA. Prior to this, he was Professor of Space Science and Aerospace Engineering at the University of Michigan, where he helped found the Center for Entrepreneurship.

Since 2023, Thomas Zurbuchen is a full professor at ETH Zürich where he leads the ETH Zürich | Space initiative and has built the space systems master's degree programme. He also does advisory engagements and keynote speaking.

Since October 2026, he serves as Senior Vice President of Advanced Concepts at Blue Origin.

In 2021 an asteroid was named after Zurbuchen.

== Personal life and education ==
Zurbuchen was born and grew up in Switzerland as the child of a Free Church preacher. He attended both high school and university against the wishes of his parents. Zurbuchen studied physics at the University of Bern, with a minor in mathematics, and was awarded a PhD in 1996 with a thesis entitled "Turbulence in the interplanetary medium and its implications on the dynamics of minor ions".

== Career ==
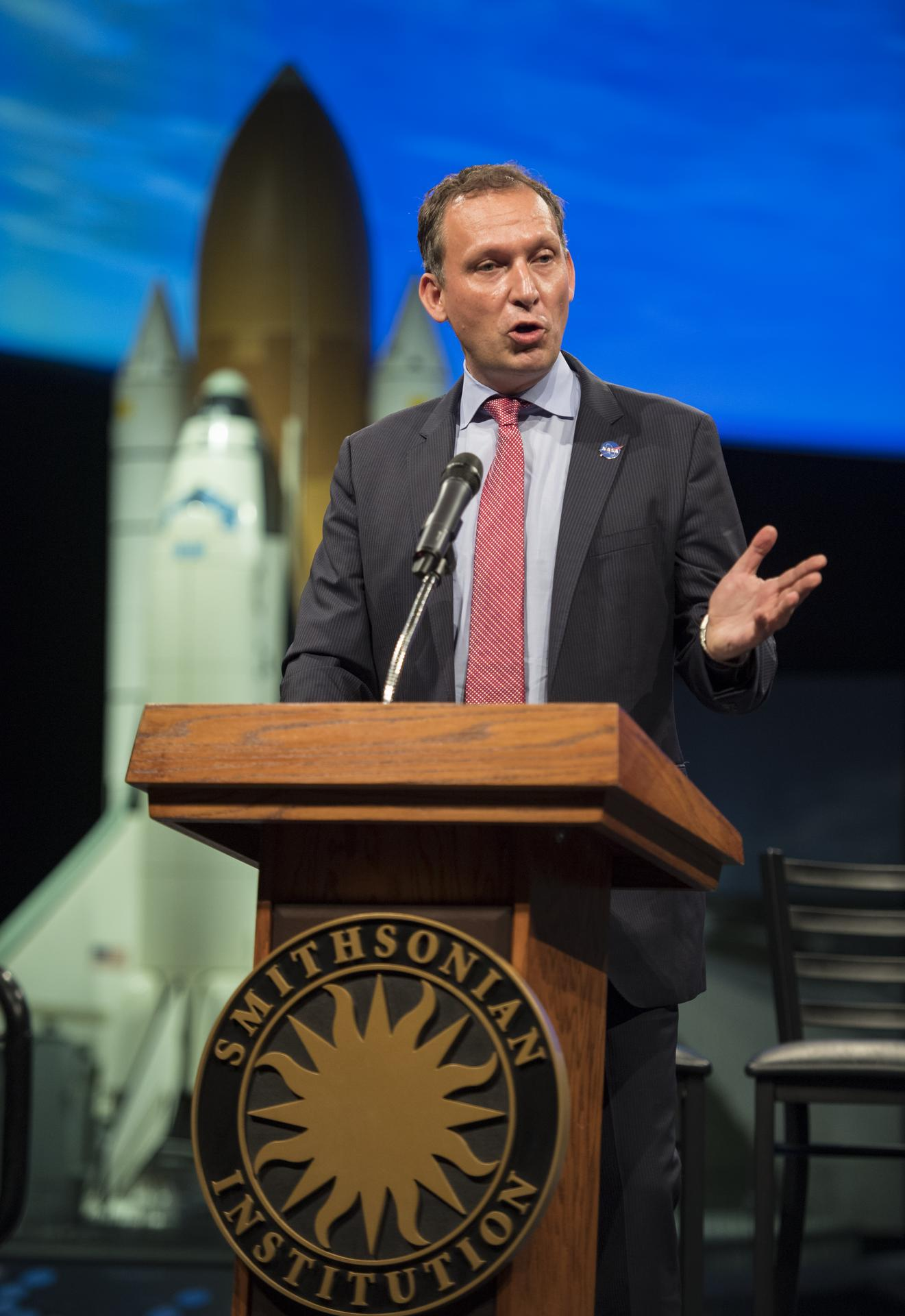
Zurbuchen gives opening remarks at an event to celebrate the 40th Anniversary of the launch of the Voyager missions, September 5, 2017

Zurbuchen moved to the United States two weeks after completing his PhD. He joined the University of Michigan as a research associate, and was made professor in 2008. His scientific research focuses on solar and heliospheric physics, experimental space research, and space systems; he is also well known for his personal work on innovation and entrepreneurship.

Zurbuchen served as team leader for the development of one of the scientific instruments aboard NASA's Messenger spacecraft to Mercury, the Fast Imaging Plasma Spectrometer. He chaired the National Academy of Sciences committee that produced a report in 2016 on Cubesats.

From October 2016 until the end of 2022, Zurbuchen was the longest continually running Associate Administrator for the Science Mission Directorate at NASA. During this time, NASA launched 37 missions and started another 54. Among them were the James Webb Space Telescope, Perseverance and Ingenuity Mars Landings, DART, and many others for which he was responsible, and for his contribution to the success of which he was awarded the von Braun Award for Excellence in Space Program Management. Due to his work, Zurbuchen is routinely featured in interviews, public lectures, and podcasts, focussed on leadership innovation and management techniques, especially in complex organizations. Examples include, but are not limited to the Harvard Business Review, the Knowledge Project, (German) Chefgespräch, and (German) Alles Gesagt.

As of January 2023, Zurbuchen works as an international speaker. Since August 2023, Zurbuchen is director of ETH Zurich Space and holds a full professorship there.

== Other activities ==
- Planet Labs, Member of the European Advisory Board (since 2026)
- Schindler Group, Member of the Board of Directors (since 2024)
- Firefly Aerospace, Member of the Board of Directors (since 2025)
- Voyager Space, Member of the advisory board (since 2024)
- McKinley Apartments, Member of the Board of Directors

== Awards ==
- 1996-1997: Swiss National Science Foundation's Young Researcher Award
- 2001: Research Scientist Excellence Award, University of Michigan, College of Engineering
- 2004: National Science and Technology Council (NSTC) Presidential Early Career for Scientists and Engineers (PECASE) Award
- 2005: University of Michigan College of Engineering 2005 Service Excellence Award
- 2006: NASA Group Achievement Award, Ulysses Mission
- 2009: Rackham Faculty Recognition Award, University of Michigan
- 2018: Heinrich-Greinacher-Prize of the University of Bern
- 2020: von Kármán Lecture in Astronautics Award AIAA
- 2020: NASA Outstanding Leadership Medal
- 2021: US Presidential Rank Award
- 2021: Honorary doctorate degree (Dr. of Science) of Northern Michigan University.
- 2022: NASA Distinguished Service Medal
- 2022: Space Transport Association Leadership Award
- 2022: Member of the Swiss Academy of Engineering Sciences (SATW)
- 2022: Wernher von Braun Distinguished Science Award.
- 2022: Honorary doctorate degree (Dr. h. c.) of the ETH Zurich
- 2023: Innovator of the Year, Wirtschaftswoche
- 2023: Honorary doctorate degree (Doctorate of Science) of Rochester Institute of Technology
- 2023: Fellow, American Institute of Aeronautics and Astronautics (AIAA)
- 2023: Excellence in international cooperation award, International Astronautical Federation
- 2023: Honorary doctorate degree (Dr. of Science) of University of Michigan
- 2024: Aerosuisse Award
- 2024: Nelson W. Spencer Lecturer Award
- 2025: von Braun Award for Excellence in Space Program Management, American Institute of Aeronautics and Astronautics (AIAA)
- 2025: Stratton Prize for outstanding career achievements in fostering intercultural understanding between Switzerland and the United States
- 2026: AIAA Public Service Award
- 2026: Prix Suisse 2026 laureate, for exceptional contributions to Switzerland

== Popular culture ==
Zurbuchen is referenced in the King Gizzard and the Lizard Wizard song The Last Oasis.
