= Gumboot Soup =

Studio album by King Gizzard & the Lizard Wizard
- Released: 31 December 2017
- Studio: Flightless HQ (tracks 1, 4, 8-11; add. on tracks 2, 3, 6, 7); Rada, Perth (tracks 2, 7); bandmember Joey Walker's bedroom (track 5); Whammy Bar, Auckland (add. on tracks 2, 4, 5)
- Genre: Psychedelic rock; neo-psychedelia
- Length: 44:08
- Label: Flightless
- Producer: Stu Mackenzie

King Gizzard & the Lizard Wizard chronology
Polygondwanaland (2017)	Gumboot Soup (2017)	Fishing for Fishies (2019)

Singles from Gumboot Soup
- 1. "All Is Known" Released: 13 December 2017; 2. "Beginner's Luck" Released: 13 December 2017; 3. "Greenhouse Heat Death" Released: 19 December 2017; 4. "The Last Oasis" Released: 20 December 2017

Gumboot Soup is the thirteenth studio album by Australian psychedelic rock band King Gizzard & the Lizard Wizard. It was released on 31 December 2017 by Flightless Records in Australia, ATO Records in the United States, and Heavenly Recordings in Europe. The album is the final of five albums released by the band in 2017. The artwork was designed by longtime band collaborator Jason Galea.

== Background ==
Stu Mackenzie stated in an interview that the album is composed of songs that didn't fit in any of the other four albums released by the band in 2017, and that the album is more song oriented than the other releases that year. He also stated that he worked through the Christmas period of 2017 to complete the album before the end of the year.

Professional ratings
Review scores
Source	Rating
AllMusic	4/5 stars
Pitchfork	7.7/10

== Singles ==
Four of the album's songs would be released as promotional singles before the album's release. These were "All Is Known" and "Beginner's Luck" which were released together on December 13th, 2017, "Greenhouse Heat Death" which was released on the 19th, and "The Last Oasis" which was released on the 20th.

== Track listing ==
Vinyl releases have tracks 1–6 on Side A, and tracks 7–11 on Side B.

No.	Title	Writer(s)	Length
1.	"Beginner's Luck"	Stu Mackenzie; Ambrose Kenny-Smith	4:25
2.	"Greenhouse Heat Death"	Mackenzie	4:13
3.	"Barefoot Desert"	Mackenzie; Kenny-Smith; Cook Craig	3:43
4.	"Muddy Water"	Mackenzie; Joey Walker	3:38
5.	"Superposition"	Walker	3:35
6.	"Down the Sink"	Craig	3:59
7.	"The Great Chain of Being"	Mackenzie	4:50
8.	"The Last Oasis"	Mackenzie; Kenny-Smith; Walker	3:34
9.	"All Is Known"	Mackenzie	3:34
10.	"I'm Sleepin' In"	Mackenzie	3:00
11.	"The Wheel"	Mackenzie; Kenny-Smith	5:37
Total length:			44:08

== Personnel ==
Credits for Gumboot Soup adapted from liner notes.

King Gizzard & the Lizard Wizard

- Michael Cavanagh – drums (tracks 1–9, 11)
- Cook Craig – guitar (tracks 2, 3, 6, 7, 9), vocals (tracks 3, 6), keys (tracks 3, 6), bass guitar (tracks 3, 6), mellotron (track 6)
- Ambrose Kenny-Smith – vocals (tracks 1, 3, 4, 6, 8–11), harmonica (tracks 9, 10), synthesizer (track 7), keys (track 9)
- Stu Mackenzie – vocals (tracks 1, 2, 4, 7–11), keys (tracks 1, 3, 4, 6, 8, 10, 11), percussion (tracks 1–4, 9–11), guitar (tracks 1, 2, 4, 7, 9, 10), mellotron (tracks 1, 3, 6, 8, 10), flute (tracks 1, 3–6), saxophone (tracks 4–6, 9), bass (tracks 1, 10), synthesizer (tracks 2, 7), drums (track 10)
- Eric Moore – drums (tracks 7, 9)
- Lucas Skinner – bass (tracks 2, 4, 7, 9), keys (tracks 8, 11), piano (track 1)
- Joey Walker – guitar (tracks 2, 4, 5, 7, 9), bass (tracks 5, 8, 11), synthesizer (track 5), vocals (track 5), percussion (track 5)

Production

- Stu Mackenzie – recording (tracks 1, 2, 4, 7–11), additional recording (tracks 2–6), mixing (tracks 3, 4, 6, 9–11)
- Cook Craig – recording (tracks 3, 6)
- Joey Walker – recording (track 5), mixing (tracks 2, 5)
- Michael Badger – mixing (tracks 1, 7, 8)
- Joe Carra – mastering

Design

- Jason Galea – artwork and layout
- Jamie Wdziekonski – photography

== Charts ==
Chart performance for Gumboot Soup
Chart (2018–2019)	Peak position
Australian Albums (ARIA)	6
Belgian Albums (Ultratop Flanders)	154
New Zealand Heatseeker Albums (RMNZ)	6
US Independent Albums (Billboard)	11
US Heatseekers Albums (Billboard)	4
US Top Album Sales (Billboard)	76
