= Some of Us =

Single by King Gizzard & the Lizard Wizard

from the album K.G.
- Released: 13 August 2020
- Length: 3:52
- Label: Flightless
- Songwriter: Cook Craig
- Producer: Stu Mackenzie

King Gizzard & the Lizard Wizard singles chronology
"Honey" (2020)	"Some of Us" (2020)	"Straws in the Wind" (2020)

Music video
- "Some of Us" on YouTube

"Some of Us" is a single released by Australian psychedelic rock band King Gizzard and the Lizard Wizard on 13 August 2020, that was included on their sixteenth studio album K.G..

== Composition ==
The song's lyrics stated that "Some of Us" are calling out those who ignore the warning signs of bigotry and prejudice with a reminder that “everything turns into dust” as well as directly mentioning how the COVID-19 pandemic fueled xenophobia across the world. Some of Us was written by Cook Craig as a demo in 2019, and is sung by Stu Mackenzie.

== Release ==
A music video directed, edited and shot by John Angus Stewart, was released on August 13, 2020, alongside a single release. The release would come shortly after the release of Honey, and before K.G. had even been announced. The video was recorded on a thermal camera with Stewart pretending to be in the military to buy it. It would be the last video released before the departure of Eric Moore on August 25, 2020, though he had no involvement in the video or K.G..

== Reception ==
Stereogum described "Some of Us" as a "jerky and chaotic and barreling track." Triple J described it as "warped and hypnotic" and gave high praise to its lyrics and music video. X-Press Magazine gave the single a 7/10, describing the song as a "marriage between King Gizzard and Tool" but that it "doesn’t flash any new tricks from the Gizz for once."
