= Beginner's Luck (song) =

Single by King Gizzard & the Lizard Wizard

from the album Gumboot Soup
- Released: 13 December 2017
- Genre: Psychedelic rock
- Length: 4:25
- Label: Flightless; ATO
- Songwriters: Stu Mackenzie; Ambrose Kenny-Smith
- Producer: Stu Mackenzie

King Gizzard & the Lizard Wizard singles chronology
"All Is Known" (2017)	"Beginner's Luck" (2017)	"Greenhouse Heat Death" (2017)

Music video
- "Beginner's Luck" on YouTube

"Beginner's Luck" is a single released by Australian psychedelic rock band King Gizzard & the Lizard Wizard. Released on 13 December 2017, the single was later released as the lead track on the album Gumboot Soup.

== Background ==
In 2020 Michael Cavanagh said that the inspiration from the song came from Stu Mackenzie's gambling addiction, which Stu confirmed saying "it's sad". In 2022 Joey Walker joked that the band was working on a second song about gambling, titled "How to Train Your Dragon", (Note: In reference to both the movie and chasing the dragon.) but that Stu fell asleep before it could be finished.

== Recording ==
"Beginner's Luck" was recorded at Flightless HQ and released as a single on 12 December 2017, alongside "All Is Known". Two more singles from the album were also released, "Greenhouse Heat Death", and "The Last Oasis". The song became the opening track for Gumboot Soup which was released on December 31, 2017. Jason Galea, who designed the cover art, said that the art was a scrapped early draft of the cover for Murder of the Universe.

== Reception ==
The song was extensively played during their European Tour 2018 and included on Live in Asheville '19; however, it fell out of the band's rotation shortly thereafter, with the song not being played since 2019. Described as "slower" and "pop", The Fire Note magazine noted that it fit tonally with Paper Mache Dream Balloon.
