= L.W. (album) =

Studio album by King Gizzard & the Lizard Wizard
- Released: 25 February 2021
- Recorded: 2020
- Genre: Psychedelic rock
- Length: 42:10
- Labels: Flightless; self-released
- Producer: Stu Mackenzie

King Gizzard & the Lizard Wizard chronology
K.G. (2020)	L.W. (2021)	Butterfly 3000 (2021)

Full chronology
Live in London '19 (2020)	L.W. (2021)	Live in Melbourne '21 (2021)

Singles from L.W.
- 1. "If Not Now, Then When?" Released: 10 December 2020; 2. "O.N.E." Released: 28 January 2021; 3. "Pleura" Released: 18 February 2021

L.W. (subtitled Explorations into Microtonal Tuning, Volume 3) is the seventeenth studio album by Australian psychedelic rock band King Gizzard & the Lizard Wizard. It was released on 25 February 2021 by Flightless in Australia and self-released in the U.K., U.S., and Europe on 28 May 2021. The album was preceded by 3 singles, ("If Not Now, Then When?", "O.N.E." and "Pleura") which were released alongside music videos uploaded to YouTube. L.W. is a companion album to K.G. Explorations into Microtonal Tuning, Volume 2, released only four months before, and a continuation of microtonal themes first featured in Flying Microtonal Banana (2017).

== Background ==
The album was hinted at as early as October 2020, before the previous album had even been released. The band released a shirt with their full discography on the back, where fans deduced that the final letters, "K.G.L.W.", were referring to the band's upcoming album, K.G. and a future album, presumably titled "L.W.".

The album's opening track, "If Not Now, Then When?" was released as a single on 10 December 2020, and was accompanied with a music video, uploaded to the band's official YouTube page. The singles "O.N.E." and "Pleura" were released on January 28 and February 18, respectively, with accompanying music videos - with the latter recorded, edited, and uploaded to YouTube in under a day.

The album's existence was confirmed by a listing on the online music store Elusive Disc, where a listing for the album's pre-order had appeared. This listing also confirmed the tracklist and release date, albeit by accident. The band itself clarified that this was untrue, with the album "definitely not coming out in February", but later backtracked, giving three different release dates for the album, eventually confirming the release date. On February 22, a final teaser snippet was uploaded to YouTube, featuring a minute of audio from the sludge-metal track "K.G.L.W". The video, created by long-time band collaborator Jason Galea and titled From the bowels of hell, comes L.W (real footage), is a 3D animation featuring an army of skeletons working to forge a number of chains, which they use to pull the L.W. logo out of a pit of lava - announcing the final release date of February 26. It was then released a day early on their personal Bandcamp page.

== Composition ==
L.W. has been praised for exploring and utilizing a diverse array of facets from psychedelia genres and incorporating an "Eastern" sound.

The album starts with the psychedelic funk song: "If Not Now, Then When?," with "O.N.E." and "Supreme Ascendancy" continuing to utilize the funk. "Ataraxia" has been described as dark and Sabbath-meets-T-Rex-like, and is followed by the penultimate "See Me," which is "a slice of experimental psychedelia."

"Static Electricity" takes on motorik acid folk, while L.W. ends with the sludge metal mantra of "K.G.L.W." "K.G.L.W." has also been described as heavy psych.

== Critical reception ==
L.W. was well received by critics, with reviewers such as Pitchfork and Exclaim differing in their opinions on whether it was a stronger album than its predecessor. Among professional critics, L.W. received an average Metacritic score of 82 (versus 77 for K.G.); their scores were 8.3 and 8.9 respectively among users of the site.

Professional ratings
Aggregate scores
Source	Rating
Metacritic	82/100
Review scores
Source	Rating
AllMusic	4/5 stars
Clash	8/10
Exclaim!	7/10
Pitchfork	7.5/10

== Track listing ==
Vinyl releases have tracks 1–5 on Side A and tracks 6–9 on Side B.

L.W. track listing
No.	Title	Writer(s)	Length
1.	"If Not Now, Then When?"	Stu Mackenzie	3:50
2.	"O.N.E."	Mackenzie	3:40
3.	"Pleura"	Joey Walker; Mackenzie	4:11
4.	"Supreme Ascendancy"	Ambrose Kenny-Smith; Mackenzie	3:40
5.	"Static Electricity"	Mackenzie; Kenny-Smith	5:50
6.	"East West Link"	Mackenzie	3:09
7.	"Ataraxia"	Walker	5:18
8.	"See Me"	Mackenzie	4:04
9.	"K.G.L.W."	Mackenzie	8:28
Total length:			42:10

== Personnel ==
Credits for L.W. adapted from liner notes

King Gizzard & the Lizard Wizard

- Stu Mackenzie – guitar; vocals (1–6, 8, 9), drums, clavinet (1); percussion (1, 9); Wurlitzer (1, 2), keyboards (1, 5, 8), sitar (1, 2, 4, 6, 7), synthesiser (1, 2, 5, 9), bass guitar (2–6, 8, 9), electric piano, marimba (2); flute (2, 3, 6, 7), vibraphone (3), organ (3, 7), pungi, bağlama (7); celesta, clarinet (8)
- Michael Cavanagh – drums; percussion (2, 5, 6)
- Cook Craig – synthesiser (1, 2, 6), vibraphone (1), guitar (2), piano, double bass (6); hammer and anvil (9)
- Ambrose Kenny-Smith – harmonica (1–3, 6, 9), vocals (2, 4, 5, 8), percussion (2–6, 8), keyboards (2, 4, 6); organ, piano (4)
- Joey Walker – guitar (2, 3, 7), vocals (3, 7), synthesiser (3), bass guitar, percussion, Elektron Digitakt (7); MRI machine, hydraulic hammer, drawbridge, chainsaw, nail gun, angle grinder (9)
- Lucas Harwood – bass guitar (1)

Production and design

- Stu Mackenzie – production; recording, mixing (1–6, 8, 9)
- Michael Cavanagh – recording (1–7, 9)
- Ambrose Kenny-Smith – recording (4)
- Joey Walker – mixing (3, 7), recording (7)
- Jason Galea – artwork
- Joseph Carra – mastering

== Charts ==
Chart performance for L.W.
Chart (2021)	Peak position
Australian Albums (ARIA)	4
Belgian Albums (Ultratop Wallonia)	119
Scottish Albums (Official Charts)	56
Swiss Albums (Schweizer Hitparade)	37
US Top Album Sales (Billboard)	35
