= I'm in Your Mind Fuzz =

Studio album by King Gizzard & the Lizard Wizard
- Released: 31 October 2014
- Studios: Daptone, Brooklyn (tracks 1, 3, 4, 6, 7); A Secret Location, Melbourne (tracks 2, 5, 8-10); Hunter Mountain, New York (add.)
- Genres: Psychedelic rock; garage rock
- Length: 42:05
- Labels: Heavenly; Flightless; Castle Face
- Producer: Stu Mackenzie

King Gizzard & the Lizard Wizard chronology
| Oddments (2014) | I'm in Your Mind Fuzz (2014) | Quarters! (2015) |

Singles from I'm in Your Mind Fuzz
- 1. "Cellophane" Released: 17 November 2014

Professional ratings
Aggregate scores
| Source | Rating |
|---|---|
| Metacritic | 75/100 |
Review scores
| Source | Rating |
| AllMusic | 3.5/5 stars |
| Exclaim! | 7/10 |
| NME | 4.5/5 stars |
| Pitchfork | 7/10 |
| The Guardian | 4/5 stars |
| The Line of Best Fit | 7.5/10 |
| The Music | 4.5/5 stars |
| The Irish Times | 4/5 stars |

I'm in Your Mind Fuzz is the fifth studio album by Australian psychedelic rock band King Gizzard & the Lizard Wizard. It was released on 31 October 2014 on Flightless Records in Australia, just over a week later on 11 November in the United States on Castle Face Records, and on 1 December that same year on Heavenly Records worldwide. At the J Awards of 2014, the album was nominated for Australian Album of the Year. I'm in Your Mind Fuzz was the band's first album to chart on the ARIA charts, peaking at number 85.

== Background ==
I'm in Your Mind Fuzz was King Gizzard's first release with Heavenly Records and Castle Face Records, serving as their worldwide debut as prior albums had only been released domestically by Flightless at that point. The band released the track "Cellophane" on SoundCloud as the lead single on 14 September 2014, followed by a 3D music video for the song two days later. On 6 November, a week after the album had released in Australia, the band released a music video for the song "Satan Speeds Up".

The album cover by Jason Galea was inspired by the cover art for the 1983 Atari 8-bit computer game Fortress, which was originally designed by Louis Seakow and which Galea repainted for the album. Galea had sought to credit the original artist, Louis Seakow, when the album was originally released, but could only find a credit for the company Image Creations. Galea discovered Seakow's identity in 2019 and contacted him, after which a credit to Seakow was added to future pressings of I'm In Your Mind Fuzz.

== Music ==
The album has been described as psychedelic rock and garage rock.

== Track listing ==
Vinyl releases have tracks 1–6 on Side A, and tracks 7–10 on Side B.

All tracks are written by Stu Mackenzie except for “Hot Water”, written by Stu Mackenzie and Joey Walker.

I'm in Your Mind Fuzz track listing
| No. | Title | Length |
|---|---|---|
| 1. | "I'm in Your Mind" | 3:34 |
| 2. | "I'm Not in Your Mind" | 2:58 |
| 3. | "Cellophane" | 3:11 |
| 4. | "I'm in Your Mind Fuzz" | 2:52 |
| 5. | "Empty" | 4:11 |
| 6. | "Hot Water" | 3:24 |
| 7. | "Am I In Heaven?" | 7:06 |
| 8. | "Slow Jam 1" | 2:55 |
| 9. | "Satan Speeds Up" | 3:40 |
| 10. | "Her and I (Slow Jam 2)" | 8:16 |
| Total length: | | 42:05 |

== Personnel ==
Credits for I'm in Your Mind Fuzz adapted from liner notes.

King Gizzard & the Lizard Wizard

- Michael Cavanagh – drums
- Cook Craig – guitars
- Ambrose Kenny-Smith – blues harp
- Stu Mackenzie – vocals, guitars, keys, flute
- Eric Moore – drums
- Lucas Skinner – bass
- Joey Walker – guitars, vocals

Production

- Stu Mackenzie – production, additional recording, mixing (tracks 2, 5, 6, 8–10), additional mixing (tracks 1, 3, 4, 7)
- Wayne Gordon – recording (tracks 1, 3, 4, 6, 7)
- Paul Maybury – recording (tracks 2, 5, 8–10), mixing (tracks 2, 8, 10)
- Michael Badger – mixing (tracks 1, 3, 4, 7)
- Joe Carra – mastering
- Jason Galea – art (recreation of art by Louis Saekow)
