= Butterfly 3000 =

Album by King Gizzard & the Lizard Wizard

Studio album by King Gizzard & the Lizard Wizard
- Released: 11 June 2021
- Genre: Dream pop; synth-pop; dance-pop; neo-psychedelia; art pop
- Length: 43:52
- Label: KGLW
- Producer: Stu Mackenzie

King Gizzard & the Lizard Wizard chronology
L.W. (2021)	Butterfly 3000 (2021)	Made in Timeland (2022)

Full chronology
Live in Sydney '21 (2021)	Butterfly 3000 (2021)	Live in Milwaukee '19 (2022)

Butterfly 3000 is the eighteenth studio album by Australian psychedelic rock band King Gizzard & the Lizard Wizard, released on 11 June 2021. It is the band's first album to be released on their own KGLW label worldwide, as opposed to Flightless Records. It is their second studio LP of 2021, following February's L.W.. The album was described as "melodic" and "psychedelic" upon its initial announcement on 10 May, along with the words "cross-eyed autostereogram", in reference to the album art.

== Background and recording ==
On 19 March 2021, the band released one of the live performances from their recent tour as a bootleg album, titled Live in Melbourne '21, as well as their 13th Gizzymail newsletter. In the mail, there was a statement that read, "We've been having heaps of fun cooking up NEW STUFF in the studio. Can't wait to share new music with you." This suggested that the band had a new album in the works.

Recorded during the COVID-19 pandemic, the album's origins stem from recording instrumental interludes for their 2020 live album, Chunky Shrapnel: "We wrote a couple of song in major key vibes and we knew it wouldn't work on Chunky Shrapnel, which we were putting together. We had the song "Dreams", a synth pop thing that was clearly wrong for it. We just accidentally made this music that felt like it warranted its own project. And "Shanghai" came then "Black Hot Soup" and "Ya Love", and it felt like enough to hold a record and we should explore this concept super deeply." These early sessions were done as part of explorations for a follow-up to 2017's Polygondwanaland, before taking on an identity of its own.

Frontman Stu Mackenzie's daughter, Minty, was born during the recording process, influencing his worldview: "I definitely felt like I was in a cocoon before Minty was born. A butterfly is just a beautifully easy, metaphorical creature with this bizarre and interesting life cycle. That was the central motif for the whole record. And we tried to use it in every song."

On 11 May, the band revealed their next album: Butterfly 3000, due 11 June, and stated the album would have no singles leading to release. Matthew Ismael Ruiz of Pitchfork reported on the album with additional news from the band; "that it would have 10 tracks, that it was built around modular synth loops and the album art would be a 'cross-eyed autostereogram' by long-time collaborator Jason Galea."

The album was referred as "a suite of 10 songs" in the press release which suggested the songs were connected musically, and the final album's tracks all segue into another. The press release also described it as "[possibly] their most fearless leap into the unknown yet." Multiple articles breaking down the press release suggested the album would be a psychedelic, Animal Collective-style dream pop/neo-psychedelia record.

== Release ==
Professional ratings
Review scores
Source	Rating
Clash	8/10
DIY	4/5 stars
Exclaim!	7/10
NME	3/5 stars
Pitchfork	7.5/10

On 10 June, the band announced a pre-order for 11 vinyl variants, each printed in a different language (the standard English variant, and the limited-edition Hindi, Dutch, French, German, Japanese, Latin, Mandarin, Russian, Spanish, Thai and Turkish variants). In addition, each individual record is a surprise color or "lucky dip of either Caterpillar Red Wax, Chrysalis Yellow Wax or Butterfly Blue Wax." The band released the album digitally on 11 June as planned in Australia, but put the album online for all other territories early through Bandcamp.

No information was revealed other than the aforementioned attributes and a 15-second snippet until its release, no singles were revealed, and unlike the band's last few albums, the album did not leak. In anticipation of the release, frontman Stu Mackenzie stated that it was his "favourite Gizzard album".

=== Translated versions ===
In July 2022, the band released a special edition of the album with all 10 songs translated into Noongar after approached by Noongar fan Tyrone Hansen, whose mother Merinda is a teacher of the language; both Merinda and friend Lois Spehn-Jackson translated the lyrics. All proceedings of this edition (titled Bindi Bindi 3000) are donated to the Langford Aboriginal Association serving metropolitan Perth.

== Music videos ==
On 12 June, the band announced that every song on the album would get a music video. The video for "Yours" was the first to be released, on 14 June. Directed by John Angus Stewart, the live-action video features the band in various local spots around Melbourne. The video is preceded by a "photosensitive seizure warning". The video for "Shanghai" followed on 21 June, directed and animated by Amanda Bonaiuto. The videos for "Dreams" and "Blue Morpho" were released on 28 June and 6 July, respectively, with both videos being directed and animated by Jamie Wolfe. Released on 12 July, the video for "Interior People" was written and directed by Ivan Dixon, and produced and animated at Studio Showoff. The music video is inspired by the works of French artist Moebius, and the films Nausicaä of the Valley of the Wind and Heavy Metal.

The live-action video for "Catching Smoke" was released on 26 July, and features the band members and additional dancers performing in suits and various intricate costumes. Stu Mackenzie is prominently featured, first appearing as a chrysalis/cocoon and ultimately transitioning into a butterfly, complete with large stylized wings and antennae. The video was written/directed by Danny Cohen and produced by both Cohen and Tessa Mansfield-Hung. The video for "2.02 Killer Year" was released on 2 August. Directed and designed by Sophie Koko, the video features 3D animation by Jack Wedge and Will Freudenheim. Released on 11 August, the video for "Black Hot Soup" was designed, directed and edited by Guy Tyzack. The video combines real footage and animation, as well as both digital and analog video processing techniques. The videos for "Ya Love" and "Butterfly 3000" were the final to be released, on 24 August and 31 August, respectively. Both videos were created by Jason Galea, but feature different visual styles. The video for "Butterfly 3000" is also preceded by a seizure warning.

== Track listing ==
Vinyl releases have tracks 1–5 on Side A, and tracks 6–10 on Side B.

Butterfly 3000 track listing
No.	Title	Writer(s)	Length
1.	"Yours"	Stu Mackenzie	4:35
2.	"Shanghai"	Mackenzie; Ambrose Kenny-Smith	4:01
3.	"Dreams"	Mackenzie	4:04
4.	"Blue Morpho"	Mackenzie	3:51
5.	"Interior People"	Joey Walker; Mackenzie	5:15
6.	"Catching Smoke"	Mackenzie; Walker	6:28
7.	"2.02 Killer Year"	Mackenzie; Kenny-Smith	3:19
8.	"Black Hot Soup"	Mackenzie	5:12
9.	"Ya Love"	Cook Craig; Mackenzie	4:16
10.	"Butterfly 3000"	Mackenzie	2:51
Total length:			43:52

== Personnel ==
from the “Butterfly 3000” liner notes

1. Yours

- Stu Mackenzie – vocals, synthesizers, drums, acoustic guitar, bass guitar, Mellotron
- Ambrose Kenny-Smith – vocals, percussion, harmonica
- Michael Cavanagh – drums

2. Shanghai

- Stu Mackenzie – vocals, synthesizers, piano, acoustic guitar, bass guitar, Mellotron
- Cook Craig – synthesizers
- Ambrose Kenny-Smith – vocals, percussion
- Michael Cavanagh – drums

3. Dreams

- Stu Mackenzie – vocals, synthesizers, bass guitar, Mellotron
- Michael Cavanagh – drums

4. Blue Morpho

- Stu Mackenzie – vocals, synthesizers, drums, bass guitar, acoustic guitar, Mellotron, Wurlitzer
- Ambrose Kenny-Smith – saxophone
- Michael Cavanagh – drums

5. Interior People

- Stu Mackenzie – bass guitar, piano
- Joey Walker – vocals, acoustic & electric guitar, keyboards, synthesizers
- Michael Cavanagh – drums

6. Catching Smoke

- Stu Mackenzie – vocals, synthesizers, piano, acoustic guitar, bass guitar, drums, percussion
- Joey Walker – vocals, acoustic & electric guitar, keyboards, synthesizers, strings
- Cook Craig – electric guitar, synthesizers
- Ambrose Kenny-Smith – vocals, percussion
- Michael Cavanagh – drums

7. 2.02 Killer Year

- Stu Mackenzie – vocals, synthesizers, Mellotron, percussion
- Ambrose Kenny-Smith – vocals, percussion
- Michael Cavanagh – drums

8. Black Hot Soup

- Stu Mackenzie – vocals, synthesizers, bass guitar, acoustic guitar, percussion
- Cook Craig – electric guitar, synthesizers, percussion
- Ambrose Kenny-Smith – vocals, percussion
- Michael Cavanagh – drums

9. Ya Love

- Stu Mackenzie – vocals, synthesizers, drums, acoustic guitar, bass guitar
- Cook Craig – synthesizers, Mellotron, bass guitar
- Ambrose Kenny-Smith – vocals, percussion
- Michael Cavanagh – drums

10. Butterfly 3000

- Stu Mackenzie – vocals, synthesizers, drums, Mellotron, percussion
- Cook Craig – synthesizers, bass guitar
- Michael Cavanagh – drum

Production

- Stu Mackenzie – production, mixing (tracks 1–4, 6–10)
- Joey Walker – mixing (tracks 5, 6)
- Joseph Carra – mastering
- Jason Galea – artwork

== Charts ==
Chart performance for Butterfly 3000
Chart (2021)	Peak position
Australian Albums (ARIA)	2
Belgian Albums (Ultratop Wallonia)	114
US Top Album Sales (Billboard)	11
US Independent Albums (Billboard)	36
US Top Rock Albums (Billboard)	48

== Butterfly 3001 ==
Butterfly 3001

Remix album by King Gizzard & the Lizard Wizard
- Released: 21 January 2022
- Length: 1:54:00
- Label: KGLW

King Gizzard & the Lizard Wizard chronology
Live at Levitation '16 (2021)	Butterfly 3001 (2022)	Live in Brisbane '21 (2022)

Singles from Butterfly 3001
- 1. "Shanghai Dub by The Scientist" Released: 7 December 2021; 2. "Neu Butterfly 3000 Remix – Peaches" Released: 7 December 2021; 3. "Black Hot Soup (DJ Shadow "My Own Reality" Re-Write)" Released: 7 January 2022

On 7 December 2021, the band announced on their social media that they were releasing an album of remixes of songs from Butterfly 3000, titled Butterfly 3001, set to release on 21 January 2022. Alongside this announcement, they released two songs from the album - a dub remix of "Shanghai" by The Scientist, and remix titled "Neu Butterfly 3000" by Peaches. A month later, on 7 January 2022, they released the remix of "Black Hot Soup" by DJ Shadow, referred to as the "My Own Reality" Re-write, alongside a music video. On 21 January, the album released to Bandcamp and streaming platforms.

=== Track listing ===
Vinyl releases have tracks 1–5 on side A, tracks 6–9 on side B, tracks 10–13 on side C, and tracks 14–16 on side D.

Butterfly 3001 track listing
No.	Title	Length
1.	"Black Hot Soup (DJ Shadow "My Own Reality" Re-Write)"	3:36
2.	"Shanghai Dub by The Scientist"	4:00
3.	"Shanghai (Deaton Chris Anthony Remix)"	3:32
4.	"Dreams Yu Su Instrumental Mix"	5:14
5.	"Blue Morpho (Donato Dozzy Remix)"	4:57
6.	"Blue Morpho (VRIL Remix)"	4:28
7.	"Blue Morpho (Ciel's Fluttering Dub)"	5:49
8.	"Blue Morpho (ZANDOLI II remix)"	3:57
9.	"Catching Smoke DāM-FunK Instrumental Re-Freak"	6:37
10.	"Ya Love (Flaming Lips' Fascinating Haircut Re-Do)"	2:56
11.	"Ya Love (Geneva Jacuzzi Remix)"	4:28
12.	"Ya Love (Héctor Oaks playing w/ Fire Mix)"	6:33
13.	"2.02 Killer Year (Bullant's Fuck Mike Love Remix)"	8:10
14.	"Yours (Fred P Journey Mix)"	11:54
15.	"Butterfly 3000 (Terry Tracksuit Remix)"	2:30
16.	"Neu Butterfly 3000 Remix – Peaches"	5:44
17.	"Catching Smoke (4am Wack Rmx By Hieroglyphic Being)"	11:28
18.	"Blue Morpho Mall Grab Remix"	4:07
19.	"Dreams – Peaking Lights Trancedellic Macrodosing Mix"	5:25
20.	"Interior People Confidence Man Remix"	5:54
21.	"Catching Smoke remix by Kaitlyn Aurelia Smith"	2:54
Total length:		1:54:00

=== Charts ===
Chart performance for Butterfly 3001
Chart (2022)	Peak position
US Top Album Sales (Billboard)	41
US Top Dance Albums (Billboard)	6
