= K.G. (album) =

Studio album by King Gizzard & the Lizard Wizard
- Released: 20 November 2020
- Genres: Psychedelic rock; microtonal music
- Length: 41:52
- Labels: Flightless; self-released
- Producer: Stu Mackenzie

King Gizzard & the Lizard Wizard chronology
Infest the Rats' Nest (2019)	K.G. (2020)	L.W. (2021)

Full chronology
Live in San Francisco '16 (2020)	K.G. (2020)	Teenage Gizzard (2020)

Singles from K.G.
- 1. "Honey" Released: 14 July 2020; 2. "Some of Us" Released: 13 August 2020; 3. "Straws in the Wind" Released: 15 September 2020; 4. "Automation" Released: 20 October 2020; 5. "Intrasport" Released: 19 November 2020

K.G. (subtitled Explorations into Microtonal Tuning, Volume 2) is the sixteenth studio album by Australian psychedelic rock band King Gizzard & the Lizard Wizard, released on 20 November 2020 on Flightless in Australia and self-released in the U.K., U.S., and Europe. The album was preceded by four singles, the first three ("Honey", "Some of Us" and "Straws in the Wind") were released alongside music videos uploaded to YouTube. K.G. is a sonic "sequel" to Flying Microtonal Banana, which was subtitled "Explorations into Microtonal Tuning, Volume 1" and also a direct predecessor to L.W..

== "Automation" ==
"Automation", the fourth single preceding the album, was released for free on the band's website. In addition to the raw audio files for "Automation" as a whole, the band also includes the files for separate audio channels within the song such as vocals, violin, clarinet and flute, as well as video files for the music video, which the band encourages the fans to use to make their own remixes and music videos. All of these files require a torrent client to be installed on the user's device. Since the release of "Automation", there have been many remixes and music videos edited by fans and posted on sites like Reddit and YouTube. A number of these have been highlighted by the band in the King Gizzard newsletter "Gizzymail", namely in Gizzymail 6.

== Track listing ==
Announced by the band on 21 October 2020. Track durations taken from shop listing. Vinyl releases have tracks 1–5 on Side A, and tracks 6–10 on Side B.

No.	Title	Writer(s)	Length
1.	"K.G.L.W."	Stu Mackenzie	1:37
2.	"Automation"	Mackenzie	3:30
3.	"Minimum Brain Size"	Joey Walker	4:19
4.	"Straws in the Wind"	Mackenzie; Ambrose Kenny-Smith	5:42
5.	"Some of Us"	Cook Craig; Mackenzie	3:53
6.	"Ontology"	Mackenzie	3:58
7.	"Intrasport"	Walker	4:13
8.	"Oddlife"	Mackenzie; Kenny-Smith	4:58
9.	"Honey"	Mackenzie	4:34
10.	"The Hungry Wolf of Fate"	Mackenzie	5:08
Total length:			41:52

== Critical reception ==
Professional ratings
Aggregate scores
Source	Rating
Metacritic	77/100
Review scores
Source	Rating
AllMusic	3.5/5 stars
Exclaim!	7/10
NME	3/5 stars
Pitchfork	8.0/10
The Line of Best Fit	9/10
Under the Radar	8/10 stars

According to the review aggregator Metacritic, K.G. received "generally favorable reviews" based on a weighted average score of 77 out of 100 from 11 critic scores.

== Personnel ==
Credits for K.G. adapted from liner notes.

King Gizzard & the Lizard Wizard

- Stu Mackenzie – vocals (tracks 2, 4–6, 8–10), guitar (tracks 1, 2, 4–6, 8–10), bass guitar (tracks 1, 2, 4, 6, 8–10), percussion (tracks 1, 2, 4, 8–10), keyboards (tracks 1, 2, 4, 6, 8, 9), flute (tracks 1–4, 6), sitar (tracks 1, 3), synthesiser (tracks 7, 8), clavinet (tracks 5–7), xylophone (track 5), violin (track 6), vibraphone (track 6), horns (track 6), Mellotron (track 7), piano (track 8), clarinet (track 9), organ (track 9)
- Michael Cavanagh – drums (tracks 2–10), percussion (tracks 3, 4, 6, 8, 9)
- Cook Craig – guitar (tracks 4–6, 10), bass guitar (track 5), piano (track 4, 5, 9), keyboards (track 4, 5), synthesiser (tracks 5, 8, 10), sitar (track 4), percussion (track 5), clarinet (track 5), flute (track 5)
- Ambrose Kenny-Smith – vocals (tracks 4, 6, 8), harmonica (tracks 1–6, 9), keyboards (track 4), percussion (tracks 6, 8), synthesiser (track 2)
- Joey Walker – vocals (track 3, 7), guitar (tracks 3, 7), bass guitar (tracks 3, 9), juno (track 3), bağlama (track 3), synthesiser (track 7), Elektron Digitakt (track 7), percussion (track 7)
- Lucas Harwood – bass guitar (track 10), percussion (track 8)

Additional personnel

- Bella Walker – backing vocals (track 3)

Production

- Stu Mackenzie – production, mixing (tracks 1, 2, 4–6, 8–10), recording (tracks 1, 2, 4–6, 8–10)
- Joey Walker – mixing (tracks 3, 7), recording (tracks 3, 7)
- Michael Cavanagh – recording (tracks 3, 4, 6–8, 10)
- Cook Craig – recording (track 5)
- Joseph Carra – mastering
- Jason Galea – artwork

== Charts ==
Chart performance for K.G.
Chart (2020)	Peak position
Australian Albums (ARIA)	9
Belgian Albums (Ultratop Wallonia)	76
Scottish Albums (Official Charts)	11
UK Albums (Official Charts)	80
US Top Album Sales (Billboard)	40
