= Flying Microtonal Banana =

Studio album by King Gizzard & the Lizard Wizard
- Released: 24 February 2017
- Recorded: April–September 2016
- Studio: Flightless HQ
- Genre: Psychedelic rock; acid rock; experimental rock; krautrock; Anatolian rock
- Length: 41:53
- Label: Flightless; ATO; Heavenly

King Gizzard & the Lizard Wizard chronology
Nonagon Infinity (2016)	Flying Microtonal Banana (2017)	Murder of the Universe (2017)

Singles from Flying Microtonal Banana
- 1. "Rattlesnake" Released: 11 November 2016; 2. "Nuclear Fusion" Released: 21 December 2016; 3. "Sleep Drifter" Released: 17 January 2017

Flying Microtonal Banana (subtitled Explorations into Microtonal Tuning, Volume 1) is the ninth studio album by Australian psychedelic rock band King Gizzard & the Lizard Wizard. It was released on 24 February 2017 on Flightless Records in Australia, ATO Records in the United States, and Heavenly Recordings in the United Kingdom. It is the first of five albums released by the band in 2017 and their first exploration of microtonal music, utilising custom-built instruments.

The album earned the band a nomination for Best Group at the ARIA Music Awards of 2017, losing to Gang of Youths for Go Farther in Lightness. The album peaked at number two on the ARIA charts (their first top 10), and it is also the first album by the band to chart on the US Billboard 200, peaking at 170.

== Music ==
Subtitled Explorations into Microtonal Tuning, Volume 1, the album is recorded in quarter tone tuning, where an octave is divided into 24 (logarithmically) equal-distanced quarter tones; it was originally conceived to play on a baglama, so the band members used instruments specifically modified for microtonal tuning, as well as other Middle-Eastern instruments like the zurna. The name "Flying Microtonal Banana" comes from Stu Mackenzie's custom-built yellow guitar, fitted with additional microtonal frets.

The album has been described as psychedelic rock, acid rock and experimental rock, with elements of krautrock and Turkish music.

== Reception ==
Professional ratings
Aggregate scores
Source	Rating
AnyDecentMusic?	6.9/10
Metacritic	72/100
Review scores
Source	Rating
AllMusic	4/5 stars
DIY	4/5 stars
Exclaim!	8/10
The Guardian	3/5 stars
Mojo	3/5 stars
Pitchfork	7.4/10
Q	3/5 stars
Record Collector	4/5 stars
The Times	4/5 stars
Uncut	8/10

Upon its release, Flying Microtonal Banana received positive reviews from music critics. On Metacritic, the album holds an average critic score of 72 out of 100, based on 15 reviews, indicating "generally favourable reviews".

AllMusic's Tim Sendra wrote, "it's clear that the experiment was a success and that the microtuned instruments fit in perfectly with their oddball aesthetic" describing the melodies as "more exotic (to ears attuned to Western music anyway) and complex" compared to previous albums. While comparing it unfavourably to its predecessor, Pitchfork contributor Stuart Bremen still commended the album, writing "if Flying Microtonal Banana's randomized approach is ultimately less transfixing than Nonagon Infinity's maniacal focus, it nonetheless shows that, after eight previous albums, this band's creativity and curiosity knows no bounds, and their singular balance of anarchy and accessibility is still in check. So even if you don't understand the first thing about microtonality, there's still plenty of flying banana here to keep you amused."

=== Accolades ===
Accolades for Flying Microtonal Banana
Publication	Accolade	Year	Rank	Ref.
Uncut	The Best Albums Of 2017	2017	35	

== Track listing ==
Vinyl releases have tracks 1–3 on Side A, and tracks 4–9 on Side B.

Flying Microtonal Banana track listing
No.	Title	Writer(s)	Length
1.	"Rattlesnake"	Stu Mackenzie	7:48
2.	"Melting"	Mackenzie	5:27
3.	"Open Water"	Mackenzie	7:13
4.	"Sleep Drifter"	Mackenzie	4:44
5.	"Billabong Valley"	Mackenzie; Ambrose Kenny-Smith	3:34
6.	"Anoxia"	Joey Walker	3:04
7.	"Doom City"	Mackenzie	3:14
8.	"Nuclear Fusion"	Mackenzie; Walker	4:15
9.	"Flying Microtonal Banana"	Mackenzie; Walker	2:34
Total length:			41:53

== Personnel ==
Credits for Flying Microtonal Banana adapted from liner notes.

King Gizzard & the Lizard Wizard

- Michael Cavanagh – drum kit (tracks 1–8), bongos (tracks 3–5, 8, 9), percussion (track 9)
- Cook Craig – microtonal guitar (tracks 1, 3, 7), microtonal bass guitar (tracks 4, 6)
- Ambrose Kenny-Smith – microtonal harmonica (tracks 1, 4, 7–9), vocals (track 5)
- Stu Mackenzie – microtonal guitar (tracks 1–8), microtonal bass guitar (tracks 2, 8), piano (tracks 1, 5, 9), synthesizer (tracks 2, 3, 8, 9), zurna (tracks 1, 3, 5–7, 9), vocals (tracks 1–4, 7, 8), percussion (tracks 1, 2, 3, 9)
- Eric Moore – drum kit (tracks 1, 3), bongos (track 9)
- Lucas Skinner – microtonal bass guitar (tracks 1–3, 7)
- Joey Walker – microtonal guitar (tracks 1, 3, 4, 6, 8, 9), microtonal bass guitar (track 5), vocals (track 6)

Production

- Stu Mackenzie – recording
- Jarvis Taveniere – mixing
- Joe Carra – mastering
- Jason Galea – artwork and layout

== Charts ==
Chart performance for Flying Microtonal Banana
Chart (2017)	Peak position
Australian Albums (ARIA)	2
Belgian Albums (Ultratop Flanders)	87
Belgian Albums (Ultratop Wallonia)	60
Dutch Albums (Album Top 100)	79
New Zealand Heatseekers Albums (RMNZ)	7
Scottish Albums (OCC)	66
UK Albums (OCC)	100
US Independent Albums (Billboard)	10
US Top Alternative Albums (Billboard)	19
US Top Rock Albums (Billboard)	32
US Billboard 200	170
