= White Sky (song) =

Single by Vampire Weekend

from the album Contra
- Released: August 16, 2010
- Recorded: 2009
- Genre: Indie pop; afropop; worldbeat; synth-pop
- Length: 2:58
- Label: XL
- Composers: Chris Baio; Rostam Batmanglij; Ezra Koenig; Christopher Tomson
- Lyricist: Ezra Koenig
- Producer: Rostam Batmanglij

Vampire Weekend singles chronology
"Holiday" (2010)	"White Sky" (2010)	"Run" (2010)

Audio video
- "White Sky" on YouTube

Alternative cover
- cover for 12" vinyl

"White Sky" is the fourth single from Vampire Weekend's second album Contra. The single release features three remixes of the song by Basement Jaxx. It is also the first song to be written on Contra, dating back before their debut album was released.

== Production and composition ==
Band keyboardist Rostam Batmanglij made a 30-second loop on his computer, and Ezra Koenig kept listening to it at his home until he came up with the melody for it.

While Koenig considered Contra to be "something of a Californian album", "White Sky" deals with someone exploring New York and its residents.

== Track listing ==
- Digital EP
1. "White Sky" - 2:58
2. "White Sky" (Basement Jaxx Club Mix) - 6:43
3. "White Sky" (Basement Jaxx Warp Dub Mix) - 5:13
4. "White Sky" (Basement Jaxx Vamp Dub Mix) - 3:57
- Digital Remixes EP
1. "White Sky" - 2:58
2. "White Sky" (Cécile Remix) - 6:41
3. "White Sky" (New Look Remix) - 2:51
4. "White Sky" (Basement Jaxx Club Mix) - 6:42

== Personnel ==
Vampire Weekend

- Ezra Koenig – lead vocals
- Rostam Batmanglij – piano, background vocals, vocal harmonies, keyboards, harpsichord, VSS-30, drum, synth, sampler programming, guitar
- Christopher Tomson – drums
- Chris Baio – bass, background vocals

Technical

- Rostam Batmanglij – mixing, engineering
- Shane Stoneback – mixing assistance, engineering
- Justin Gerrish – engineering
- Fernando Lodeiro – engineering assistance
- Emily Lazar – mastering
- Joe LaPorta – assistant mastering engineering

== Accolades ==
Publication	Accolade	Year	Rank
Rolling Stone	50 Best Songs of 2010	2010	7

== Chart positions ==
Chart (2010–11)	Peak position
Belgium (Ultratip Bubbling Under Flanders)	16
Belgium (Ultratip Bubbling Under Wallonia)	32
France (SNEP)	60
Mexico Ingles Airplay (Billboard)	14
UK Indie (OCC)	6
UK Singles (Official Charts Company)	78
US Dance/Electronic Singles Sales (Billboard)	7
US Hot Singles Sales (Billboard)	22
