= Run (Vampire Weekend song) =

Single by Vampire Weekend

from the album Contra
- Released: December 13, 2010
- Genre: Indie pop; baroque pop; afropop
- Length: 3:52
- Label: XL
- Songwriters: Rostam Batmanglij; Ezra Koenig
- Producer: Rostam Batmanglij

Vampire Weekend singles chronology
| "White Sky" (2010) | "Run" (2010) | "Diane Young" / "Step" (2013) |

Audio video
- "Run" on YouTube

"Run" is a single released by indie band Vampire Weekend. It is the sixth and final single from their second album Contra, and was released in the United Kingdom on December 13, 2010. There was no music video produced. Lead singer Ezra Koenig said that the song was based on the Bruce Springsteen song, "Born to Run".

== Critical reception ==
The Quietus writer Darren Lee said that the "bleep-aided, sashaying majesty" of "Run" showed the band "playing to their strengths". Brian Baker of CityBeat said the track "has the synth pop feel of OMD if they'd been steered by The English Beat".

== Track listing ==
CD Single

1. "Run (Radio Edit)" – 3:40
2. "Run" – 3:52

Digital download

1. "Run" – 3:52

== Personnel ==
Vampire Weekend

- Ezra Koenig – lead vocals, guitar
- Rostam Batmanglij – piano, background vocals, vocal harmonies, keyboards, harpsichord, VSS-30, drum, synth, sampler programming
- Christopher Tomson – drums
- Chris Baio – bass

Technical

- Rostam Batmanglij – mixing, engineering
- Justin Gerrish – mixing, engineering
- Shane Stoneback – engineering
- Fernando Lodeiro – engineering assistance
- Emily Lazar – mastering
- Joe LaPorta – assistant mastering engineering

== Charts ==
| Chart (2011) | Peak position |
|---|---|
| Mexico Ingles Airplay (Billboard) | 26 |
