= List of awards and nominations received by Vampire Weekend =

Vampire Weekend awards and nominations
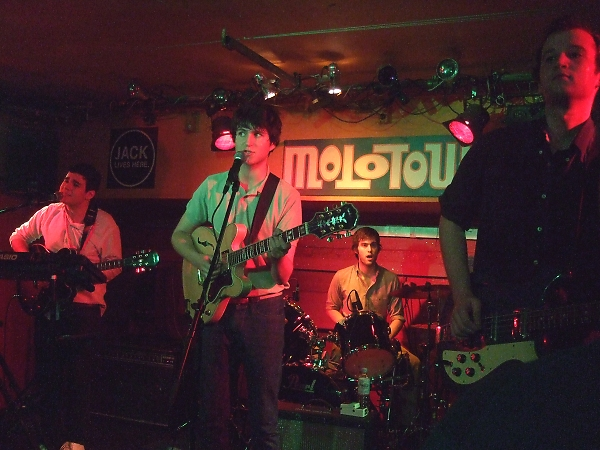
- Vampire Weekend in 2007
Awards and nominations
Award	Wins	Nominations

Totals (Note: Certain award groups do not simply award one winner. They acknowledge several different recipients, have runners-up, and have third place. Since this is a specific recognition and is different from losing an award, runner-up mentions are considered wins in this award tally. For simplification and to avoid errors, each award in this list has been presumed to have had a prior nomination.)
- Wins: 5
- Nominations: 15

Vampire Weekend is an American indie rock band from New York City. The band has released four studio albums: Vampire Weekend in 2008, Contra in 2010, and Modern Vampires of the City in 2013 under XL Recordings, and Father of the Bride in 2019 under Columbia Records.

== American Music Awards ==
The American Music Awards are given out for outstanding achievements in the record industry. Vampire Weekend have been nominated once.

Year	Nominee / work	Award	Result
2010	Vampire Weekend	Favorite Alternative Artist	Nominated

== Billboard Music Awards ==
The Billboard Music Awards are honors given out annually by Billboard, a publication covering the music business and a music popularity chart. Vampire Weekend have been nominated on one occasion.

Year	Nominee / work	Award	Result
2020	Father of the Bride	Top Rock Album	Nominated

== BRIT Awards ==
The BRIT Awards are the British Phonographic Industry's annual pop music awards. Vampire Weekend have received one nomination.

Year	Nominee / work	Award	Result
2011	Vampire Weekend	Best International Group	Nominated

== Grammy Awards ==
The Grammy Awards are awarded annually by the National Academy of Recording Arts and Sciences of the United States since 1958. Vampire Weekend have been nominated five times and have won twice.

Year	Nominee / work	Award	Result
2011	Contra	Best Alternative Music Album	Nominated
2014	Modern Vampires of the City	Best Alternative Music Album	Won
2020	Father of the Bride	Album of the Year	Nominated
2020	Father of the Bride	Best Alternative Music Album	Won
2020	"Harmony Hall"	Best Rock Song	Nominated

== International Dance Music Awards ==
The International Dance Music Awards are an annual electronic and dance music awards held by the Winter Music Conference. Vampire Weekend have received one nomination.

Year	Nominee / work	Award	Result
2011	"Giving Up the Gun"	Best Alternative/Rock Dance Track	Nominated

== MTV Europe Music Awards ==
The MTV Europe Music Awards (EMA) were established in 1994 by MTV Networks Europe to celebrate the most popular music videos in Europe. Vampire Weekend have received a nomination on one occasion.

Year	Nominee / work	Award	Result
2011	Vampire Weekend	Best Alternative	Nominated

== MTV Video Music Awards ==
The MTV Video Music Awards (VMAs) were established in 1984 by MTV to celebrate the most popular music videos in Europe. Vampire Weekend have been nominated once.

Year	Nominee / work	Award	Result
2013	"Diane Young"	Best Rock Video	Nominated

== mtvU Woodie Awards ==
The MtvU Woodie Awards are a music awards show held by mtvU to recognize "the music voted best by college students". Vampire Weekend have received two nominations.

Year	Nominee / work	Award	Result
2008	"Cape Cod Kwassa Kwassa"	Best Video	Nominated
2011	"Giving Up the Gun"	Best Video	Nominated

== NME Awards ==
The NME Awards are an annual music awards show, founded by the music magazine NME. Vampire Weekend have won one award.

Year	Nominee / work	Award	Result
2008	Vampire Weekend	Best New American Alternative/Indie Band	Won

== Q Awards ==
The Q Awards are the UK's annual music awards run by the music magazine Q. Vampire Weekend have won two awards and have been nominated another four times.

Year	Nominee / work	Award	Result
2008	Vampire Weekend	Best New Act	Nominated
2008	Vampire Weekend	Best Album	Nominated
2008	"A-Punk"	Best Video	Won
2010	"Giving Up the Gun"	Best Video	Nominated
2013	Vampire Weekend	Best Act In The World Today	Won
2019	"Harmony Hall"	Best Track	Nominated
