= Holiday (Vampire Weekend song) =

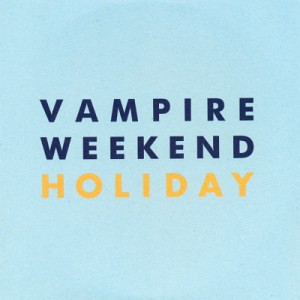

Single by Vampire Weekend

from the album Contra
- B-side: "Ottoman"
- Released: June 7, 2010
- Recorded: 2009
- Genre: Ska punk, indie pop
- Length: 2:18
- Label: XL
- Composers: Chris Baio; Rostam Batmanglij; Ezra Koenig; Christopher Tomson
- Lyricist: Ezra Koenig
- Producer: Rostam Batmanglij

Vampire Weekend singles chronology
"Giving Up the Gun" (2010)	"Holiday" (2010)	"White Sky" (2010)

Music video
- "Holiday" on YouTube

Alternative cover
- cover for 7" single

"Holiday" is a song by American indie rock band Vampire Weekend. It was released as the third single from their album Contra. The video premiered on MTV.com on May 27, 2010. The song was featured in Christmas-themed television advertisements for Tommy Hilfiger and Honda during the 2010 holiday season.

== Music video ==
The music video was directed by directing duo The Malloys, who also directed the video for the previous single from Contra, "Giving Up the Gun". It features the band dressed up as 18th century aristocrats in what appears to be the present day, taking a vacation from their jobs and doing very un-monarchical activities including attending at a pool party, driving around California in a '63 Impala and ordering In-N-Out drive-thru, going to the beach, vandalism, and assault, among other crazy activities.

The concept behind the video was to portray the band as being "fish out of water" in Los Angeles. They used their manager's pool in Hollywood Hills to shoot the pool party scenes. The band did not have a permit to shoot the music video, so all of the driving scenes were shot under technically illegal circumstances, while, ironically, the scenes in which they are assaulting a beach goer and spray painting graffiti were staged and perfectly legal. During shooting, one band member ripped the pants of his rented costume. While filming the dessert scene, the band became ill due to the amount of sugar that the members consumed during the shooting and re-shooting of the scene.

The video was featured on the VH1 show Pop-Up Video.

== Track listing ==
1. "Holiday" - 2:18
2. "Ottoman" - 4:02

== Personnel ==
Vampire Weekend

- Ezra Koenig – lead vocals, guitar
- Rostam Batmanglij – piano, background vocals, vocal harmonies, keyboards, harpsichord, VSS-30, drum, synth, sampler programming, guitar
- Christopher Tomson – drums
- Chris Baio – bass

Technical

- Rostam Batmanglij – mixing, engineering
- Justin Gerrish – mixing, engineering
- Shane Stoneback – engineering
- Fernando Lodeiro – engineering assistance
- Emily Lazar – mastering
- Joe LaPorta – assistant mastering engineering

== Chart performance ==
Chart (2010)	Peak Position
Belgium (Ultratop 50 Flanders)	55
Mexico Ingles Airplay (Billboard)	19
UK Singles Chart	158
UK Indie Chart	12
US Billboard Adult Alternative Songs	29
US Billboard Alternative Songs	31
US Billboard Heatseekers Songs	23
US Billboard Rock Airplay	34
US Billboard Rock Songs	34
