= Horchata (song) =

Single by Vampire Weekend

from the album Contra
- Released: October 5, 2009
- Genre: Indie pop; worldbeat
- Length: 3:28
- Label: XL
- Composers: Chris Baio; Rostam Batmanglij; Ezra Koenig; Christopher Tomson
- Lyricists: Rostam Batmanglij; Ezra Koenig
- Producer: Rostam Batmanglij

Vampire Weekend singles chronology
"The Kids Don't Stand a Chance" (2008)	"Horchata" (2009)	"Cousins" (2009)

Audio video
- "Horchata" on YouTube

"Horchata" is a song by American indie rock band Vampire Weekend. Written by the members of the band and produced by band member Rostam Batmanglij, the song was released as the lead single from their second album Contra on October 5, 2009 via XL Recordings. The single was initially released as a free download on the band's web site. The term "horchata" refers to a traditional beverage often made of ground almonds, sesame seeds, or rice.

== Commercial performance ==
"Horchata" peaked at #10 on the Billboard Heatseekers Songs chart and at #2 on the Billboard Bubbling Under Hot 100 Singles chart. It also peaked at #69 on the Canadian Hot 100 and #26 on the Belgium Ultratop 50 in Flanders.

== Other appearances ==
"Horchata" was featured on the Hollister Co. Christmas 2013 playlist.{cn}

== Personnel ==
Vampire Weekend

- Ezra Koenig – lead vocals, keyboard
- Rostam Batmanglij – piano, background vocals, vocal harmonies, keyboards, harpsichord, VSS-30, drum, synth, sampler programming
- Christopher Tomson – drums
- Chris Baio – bass

Additional musicians

- Mauro Refosco – marimbas, rebolo, zabumba, shekere, shakers, auxiliary percussion
- Marcus Farrar – shekere, auxiliary percussion
- Anne Donlon – vocals
- Nat Baldwin – double bass
- Jonathan Chu – violin, viola
- Hamilton Berry – cello

Production

- Rostam Batmanglij – production, string arrangements, mixing, engineering
- Justin Gerrish – mixing, engineering
- Shane Stoneback – engineering
- Fernando Lodeiro – engineering assistance
- Emily Lazar – mastering
- Joe LaPorta – assistant mastering engineering

== Charts ==
Chart (2009–10)	Peak position
Australia (ARIA Hitseekers)	15
Belgium (Ultratop 50 Flanders)	26
Canada Hot 100 (Billboard)	69
Mexico Ingles Airplay (Billboard)	17
US Bubbling Under Hot 100 (Billboard)	2
