= Giving Up the Gun =

Single by Vampire Weekend

from the album Contra
- Released: February 19, 2010
- Recorded: 2009
- Genre: Indie pop; synth-pop
- Length: 4:46 (Album Version); 3:48 (Radio Edit)
- Label: XL
- Composers: Chris Baio; Rostam Batmanglij; Ezra Koenig; Christopher Tomson
- Lyricist: Ezra Koenig
- Producer: Rostam Batmanglij

Vampire Weekend singles chronology
"Cousins" (2009)	"Giving Up the Gun" (2010)	"Holiday" (2010)

Music video
- "Giving Up the Gun" on YouTube

Alternative cover
- Promo CD cover

"Giving Up the Gun" is the second single from Vampire Weekend's second album Contra. The song was originally performed by L'Homme Run, a comedic rap duo that featured Vampire Weekend vocalist Ezra Koenig. The video was released February 19, 2010. Koenig got the idea for the song from Noel Perrin's 1979 book titled Giving Up the Gun given to him by his father. It samples the song "Let Down" by Radiohead.

== Music video ==
The video was released on February 19, 2010 worldwide and directed by The Malloys. The video intercuts between members of Vampire Weekend performing at an indoor tennis tournament officiated by RZA and a female tennis player (Jenny Murray, the goth girl in the "Cape Cod Kwassa Kwassa" video) competing in the tournament.

As she plays her way through the competition, her opponents feature a handful of characters including Joe Jonas and Jake Gyllenhaal. As she advances to the final match, it is revealed her last opponent is herself and has trouble matching up until some advice from her coach, Lil Jon. She ends the match with a return that causes the tennis ball to turn into a fireball and go right through her doppelgänger's racket, concluding the video by winning the tournament and pouring a bottle of milk over herself at the trophy ceremony. RZA then turns on a boombox that starts playing the band's song "Holiday", the next single from the album.

== Personnel ==
Vampire Weekend

- Ezra Koenig – lead vocals, programming
- Rostam Batmanglij – piano, background vocals, vocal harmonies, keyboards, harpsichord, VSS-30, drum, synth, sampler programming, guitar
- Christopher Tomson – drums
- Chris Baio – bass

Additional musicians

- Libby Gery – vocals
- Anne Donlon – vocals
- Nat Baldwin – double bass
- Hamilton Berry – cello
- Seth Rosenfeld – cello
- Jesse Novak – additional instrumentation
- Jeff Curtin – hand drums

Production

- Rostam Batmanglij – production, string arrangements, mixing, engineering
- Justin Gerrish – mixing, engineering
- Shane Stoneback – engineering
- Fernando Lodeiro – engineering assistance
- Emily Lazar – mastering
- Joe LaPorta – assistant mastering engineering

== Chart performance ==
Chart (2010)	Peak Position
Australia (ARIA Hitseekers)	8
Mexico Ingles Airplay (Billboard)	16
UK Singles Chart	172
UK Indie Chart	8
