= Dead Hand Control (album) =

Studio album by Baio
- Released: January 29, 2021
- Recorded: June 2018 – January 2020
- Studios: 13 Studios, London; Heavy Duty Studios, Burbank; C+C Music Factory, Los Angeles
- Genres: Indie rock; new wave; synth-pop
- Length: 42:13
- Label: Glassnote

Baio chronology
Man of the World (2017)	Dead Hand Control (2021)

Professional ratings
Aggregate scores
Source	Rating
AnyDecentMusic?	6.8/10
Metacritic	69/100
Review scores
Source	Rating
AllMusic	3.5/5 stars
Clash	5/10
DIY	4/5 stars
The Line of Best Fit	8/10

Dead Hand Control is the third studio album by Vampire Weekend bassist and American musician Chris Baio, who goes by the mononym Baio. It was released on January 29, 2021, by Glassnote Records.

== Background ==
The album was recorded over an 18-month period at Gorillaz vocalist Damon Albarn's 13 Studios in London and C+C Music Factory in Los Angeles.

== Release ==
On November 18, 2020, Baio announced the released of his third studio album, along with two singles: "Endless Me, Endlessly" and "What Do You Say When I’m Not There?"

On January 15, 2021, another two singles were released: "Dead Hand Control" and "Take It From Me".

== Critical reception ==
Dead Hand Control was met with "generally favorable" reviews from critics. At Metacritic, which assigns a weighted average rating out of 100 to reviews from mainstream publications, this release received an average score of 69 based on 7 reviews. AnyDecentMusic? gave the release a 6.8 out of 10 based on 7 reviews.

In a review for AllMusic, Marcy Donelson wrote: "Unlike his previous albums, the play times on Dead Hand Control vary widely, with tracks sometimes transitioning into one another. It ultimately has the effect of a night out at the club or, more precisely, a series of 12" extended dance mixes à la the 1980s that are cued up among radio cuts." Ben Miles of Clash said "Dead Hand Control, leaves you feeling somewhat underwhelmed as you come to the end of the 42 minute run time. Perhaps the most dominating issue on this LP is that it seems to fall short of what its clear intention is. Baio has nailed his colours to the mast in terms of what he is attempting to do with this album; bringing disparate and disenchanted individuals together with tales of selflessness and an eclectic influence of genres."

== Track listing ==
Dead Hand Control track listing
No.	Title	Length
1.	"Dead Hand Control"	3:34
2.	"Endless Me, Endlessly"	3:41
3.	"What Do You Say When I’m Not There?"	3:35
4.	"Dead Hand"	9:16
5.	"Take It From Me"	2:10
6.	"Caisse Noire"	7:11
7.	"Never Never Never"	3:22
8.	"O.M.W."	9:24
Total length:		42:13

== Personnel ==
Credits adapted from AllMusic.

Musicians

- Chris Baio − vocals, bass, guitar, piano
- George Hume – guitar
- Robby Sinclair – drums
- Ezra Koenig – backing vocals
- Greta Morgan – backing vocals
- Buzzy Lee – backing vocals

Production

- Chris Baio – engineer, producer
- Emily Lazar – mastering
- Lars Stalfors – mixing
- Jasmine Chen – engineer
- Chris Kasych – engineer
- John Foyle – engineer
