= Cousins (Vampire Weekend song) =

Single by Vampire Weekend

from the album Contra
- B-side: "California English, Pt. 2"
- Released: November 17, 2009
- Recorded: 2009
- Genre: Post-punk revival; indie pop; garage rock
- Length: 2:25
- Label: XL
- Composers: Chris Baio; Rostam Batmanglij; Ezra Koenig; Christopher Tomson
- Lyricist: Ezra Koenig
- Producer: Rostam Batmanglij

Vampire Weekend singles chronology
"Horchata" (2009)	"Cousins" (2009)	"Giving Up the Gun" (2010)

Music video
- "Cousins" on YouTube

"Cousins" is the first single from Vampire Weekend's second album Contra. It was recorded by the band in Mexico City and debuted a few days later in Guadalajara. The single was released November 17, 2009 and a 7" was released December 15, 2009.

== Music video ==
The video for the song, directed by Garth Jennings, debuted on MTVU on November 19, 2009. The music video was recorded at Cortlandt Alley, New York.

The video features the members of Vampire Weekend performing in a long alleyway. Throughout the song, the members of the band rotate places on a platform that moves up and down the alleyway on a track. While some of the band members are on the platform, the others take positions beside the platform. The band members also exchange masks of one another, wearing them whilst singing. Towards the end of the video, confetti starts raining down on the alley.

Stereogum describes the video as "quick, quirky, and unpredictable but not without a sense of humour about itself, so pretty much perfect for a band of Ivy Leaguers who aren't above self-satirizing their prepped up ways."

== Track listing ==
No.	Title	Length
1.	"Cousins"	2:25
2.	"California English, Pt. 2"	2:59

== Personnel ==
Vampire Weekend

- Ezra Koenig – lead vocals, guitar
- Rostam Batmanglij – piano, background vocals, vocal harmonies, keyboards, harpsichord, VSS-30, drum, synth, sampler programming, guitar
- Christopher Tomson – drums
- Chris Baio – bass

Technical

- Rostam Batmanglij – mixing, engineering
- Justin Gerrish – mixing
- Tito Fuentes – engineering
- Melchor M – engineering assistance
- Emily Lazar – mastering
- Joe LaPorta – assistant mastering engineering

== Chart performance ==
Following Contra's release on January 11, 2010, "Cousins" began to receive increasing amounts of digital downloads. The single first entered the UK Singles Chart on January 17, 2010, where it reached a current peak of #39. It entered the UK Indie charts at #3.

Chart (2010)	Peak position
Australia (ARIA Hitseekers)	12
Japan (Japan Hot 100)	51
Mexico Ingles Airplay (Billboard)	8
UK Singles (OCC)	39
UK Indie (OCC)	3
US Hot Rock & Alternative Songs (Billboard)	25
US Rock & Alternative Airplay (Billboard)	25

== Use in other media ==
Cousins is used in the opening sequence of the 2010 film, The Kids Are All Right, although the song does not appear on the soundtrack release. It also appears in Pro Evolution Soccer 2011 as a soundtrack. It was also covered by the British indie folk band Mumford & Sons. It is also available for purchase as DLC for Guitar Hero games, and is featured in Guitar Hero for iOS.
