= Cortlandt Alley =

Alley in Manhattan, New York

Coordinates: 40°43′07.8″N 74°00′05.0″W

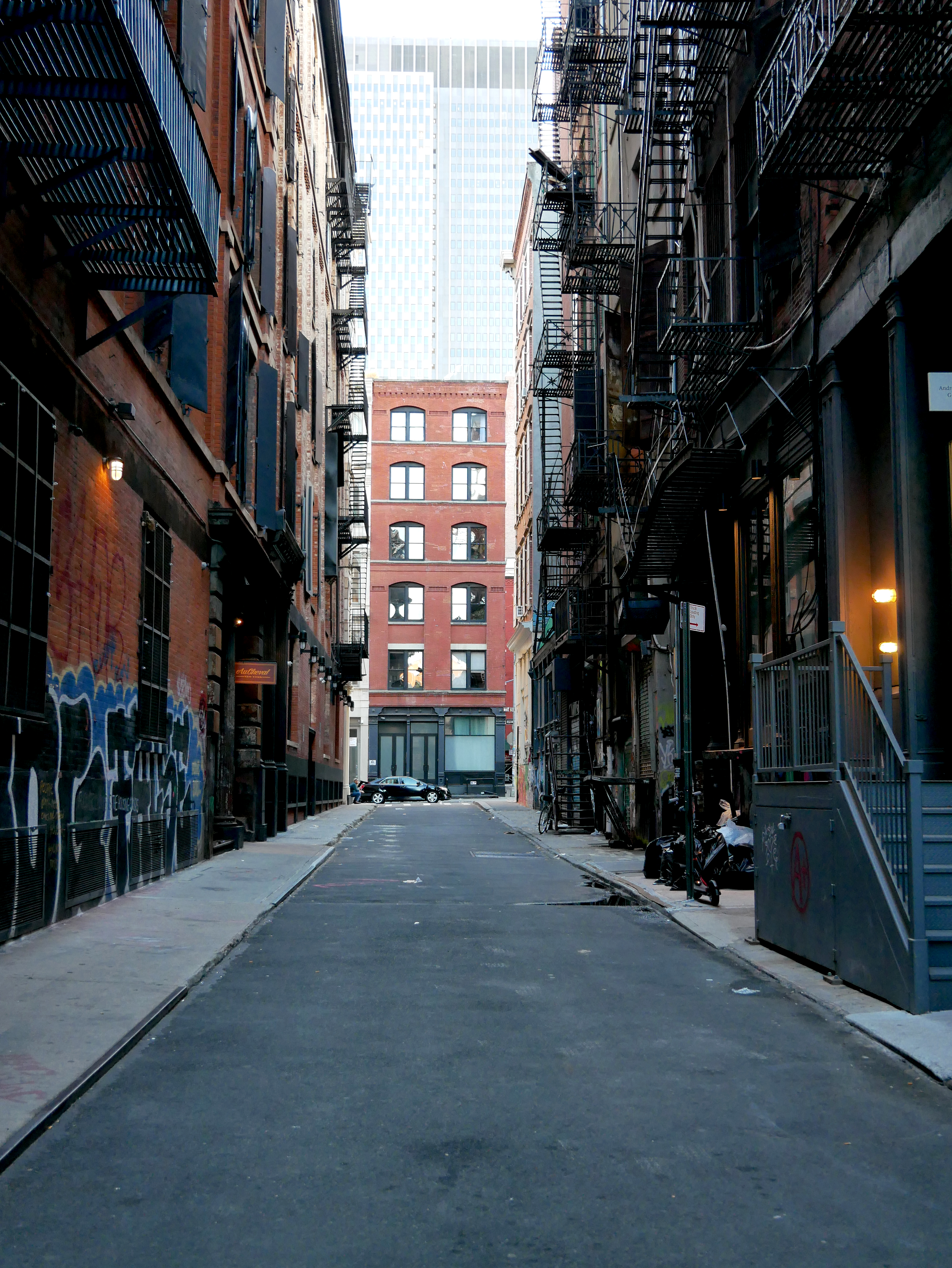
Cortlandt Alley, 2022

Cortlandt Alley is an alley in Lower Manhattan, New York City, which is often used as a filming location. Filming is not allowed in many of New York City's alleys, so Cortlandt Alley appears in many movies and TV shows, including Crocodile Dundee, 9½ Weeks and Boardwalk Empire. As of 2019, film crews were working in the alley three to four times a week.

The alley runs north to south from Canal Street to Franklin Street for three blocks between Tribeca and Chinatown. Like Cortlandt Street in Manhattan's Financial District and Van Cortlandt Park in the Bronx, the alley was named after the Van Cortlandt family. It was first laid out in 1817.

Location scout Nick Carr says "it's a self-perpetuating fictional version of New York, the alley has become iconic. It's gotten to the point that we've seen alleys in so many movies and TV shows that actual New Yorkers think that they're all around us".

== History ==
The Commissioners' Plan of 1811, regarded as the single most important document in New York City's development, was a major effort to optimize and maximize the city's real estate. The plan created 155 streets and 12 Avenues intersecting at right angles leaving out alleys by design. The plan gave the commission eminent domain: the power to force existing land owners to sell any land the commission needed in order to build their design.

Roughly 40 percent of all existing buildings were destroyed to make way for the new grid. In return for their losses, the commission omitted alleys on the land that remained, so that the land owners could provide and profit from more housing and commercial units.

Today, most of the only remaining alleys left in New York City are located in lower Manhattan south of Canal Street. Cortlandt Alley was laid out in 1817, six years after the commissioner's plan.

Filmmakers often use Cortlandt Alley as backdrop to shoot crime-related scenes. To make the alley seem more dangerous, dingy and shady, film crews have sometimes pasted papers on the walls, staged bags of garbage on the sides, and purposely dirtied the environment.

== Filming location ==
Notable films and television series include:

- Men in Black
- Teenage Mutant Ninja Turtles: Out of the Shadows
- Highlander
- Gotham
- Kate & Leopold
- Boardwalk Empire
- 9½ Weeks
- Law & Order
- NYPD Blue
- The Smurfs
- And Just Like That...

Music videos:

- Simba by J. Cole
- on the street (with J. Cole) by j-hope of BTS
- Maxident trailer by Stray Kids
- Cousins by Vampire Weekend
