= Youngish American =

Studio album by Dams of the West
- Released: February 24, 2017
- Genre: Alternative rock
- Length: 37:37
- Label: 30th Century Records; Columbia Records
- Producer: Patrick Carney; Roger Moutenot; Chris Tomson

Singles from Youngish American
- 1. "Death Wish" Released: December 2, 2016; 2. "Tell the Truth" Released: December 2, 2016

Youngish American is the debut studio album by Dams of the West, a solo project by Vampire Weekend drummer Chris Tomson. Released on Danger Mouse's record label 30th Century Records and Columbia Records, it was released on February 24, 2017. Patrick Carney of The Black Keys handled the production of the album. "Death Wish" and "Tell the Truth" were released as singles of the album.

Youngish American received mixed reviews, scoring a 56 out of 100 on review aggregator Metacritic.

== Critical reception ==
Professional ratings
Aggregate scores
Source	Rating
Metacritic	56/100
Review scores
Source	Rating
DIY	3/5 stars
Pitchfork	4.6/10
The Skinny	3/5 stars
Knoxville News Sentinel	4/5
State	3/5 stars
Uncut	6/10

Youngish American received mixed or average reviews from review aggregator Metacritic, scoring 56/100 based on 4 reviews. Grant Rindner of DIY awarded the album 3 stars out 5, praising the album's "vivid lyrics, lush melodies and Americana influences." Joseph Viney of The Skinny also reviewed the album favorably, giving the album 3 out of 5 stars. He states that the album delivers "a refreshing, varied and engaging solo debut." In contrast, Marc Hogan of Pitchfork gave the album 4.6/10, stating, "The hapless solo debut from the Vampire Weekend drummer is excruciatingly self-reflexive."

== Track listing ==
All tracks are written by Chris Tomson.

No.	Title	Length
1.	"Bridges and Tunnels"	2:51
2.	"Tell the Truth"	3:06
3.	"Death Wish"	3:47
4.	"The Inerrancy of You and Me"	3:17
5.	"Polo Grounds"	4:01
6.	"Will I Be Known to Her"	3:08
7.	"Flag on the Can"	4:30
8.	"Perfect Wave"	3:13
9.	"Pretty Good WiFi"	3:07
10.	"Youngish American"	6:37
