= List of Billboard 200 number-one independent albums =

Number-one independent albums

The following is a list of independently distributed records to achieve the #1 spot on the Billboard 200 chart since 1991, when Nielsen Soundscan began recording album sales data.

Though not clearly defined, an independent record label is generally considered to be any label that is not part of the big three record companies, which consist of Sony Music Entertainment, Warner Music Group, and Universal Music Group. Billboard cites the following definition for use on their Top Independent Albums chart: "For Billboard charting purposes, defining an independent album is done on a title level and based on its distribution. If an album is sold by an indie distributor (or, one of the major label's indie distribution arms), it is classified as an independent title and can chart on our Top Independent Albums tally. Classification is not based on a label's ownership, or if an act is signed to an independent label." Note that this definition does not exclude record labels owned by other large corporations from being classified as independent: for example, Billboard considered Disney Music Group to be an independent label for over a decade, despite being part of The Walt Disney Company, the largest media and entertainment conglomerate in the world. Disney lost the distinction in 2000 when they signed a distribution deal with Universal.

Some of the independently released albums to have topped the Billboard 200, such as the Eagles' Long Road Out of Eden (2007), Radiohead's In Rainbows (2008), Pearl Jam's Backspacer (2009), Frank Ocean's Blonde (2016) and Kanye West's collaborative album with Ty Dolla Sign, Vultures 1 (2024) are from former major label acts who had developed strong and established fanbases from their time being signed to a major label.

In 2020, Billboard updated their eligibility rules for independent albums. As of the chart dated July 18, 2020, labels that are independently owned and control their masters, but which are distributed directly through one of the "Big Three" record companies (as opposed to a major label within one of the aforementioned companies), would be eligible for Top Independent Albums. This change retroactively classified many albums that had hit #1 on the Billboard 200 as "independent". For the sake of consistency, those albums, such as Taylor Swift's 1989 (Big Machine Records), Adele's 21 (XL Recordings), and the soundtrack to Frozen (Walt Disney Records), are not included in the list below.

== Albums ==
- N.W.A – Niggaz4Life (Ruthless Records/Priority Records), 1991
- Ice Cube – The Predator (Priority Records/EMI), 1992
- Various Artists – The Lion King Soundtrack (Walt Disney Records), 1994
- Various Artists – Friday Soundtrack (Priority Records), 1995
- Various Artists – Pocahontas Soundtrack (Walt Disney Records), 1995
- Bone Thugs-n-Harmony – E. 1999 Eternal (Ruthless Records), 1995
- Tha Dogg Pound – Dogg Food (Death Row Records/Interscope), 1995
- Bone Thugs-n-Harmony – The Art of War (Ruthless Records), 1997
- Eagles – Long Road Out of Eden (Eagles Recording Company II), 2007
- Radiohead – In Rainbows (TBD Records/ATO Records), 2008
- Pearl Jam – Backspacer (Monkeywrench Records), 2009
- Vampire Weekend – Contra (XL Recordings), 2010
- Various Artists – Hope for Haiti Now (MTV Networks), 2010
- Arcade Fire – The Suburbs (Merge Records), 2010
- Cake – Showroom of Compassion (Upbeat Records), 2011
- Mac Miller – Blue Slide Park (Rostrum Records), 2011
- Mumford & Sons – Babel (Glassnote Records), 2012
- Jason Aldean – Night Train (Broken Bow Records), 2012
- Vampire Weekend – Modern Vampires of the City (XL Recordings), 2013
- Queens of the Stone Age – ...Like Clockwork (Matador Records), 2013
- Garth Brooks – Blame It All on My Roots: Five Decades of Influences (Pearl Records), 2013
- Lecrae – Anomaly (Reach Records), 2014
- Jason Aldean – Old Boots, New Dirt (Broken Bow Records), 2014
- Alabama Shakes – Sound & Color (ATO Records), 2015
- Tyrese – Black Rose (Voltron Recordz/Caroline Records), 2015
- Janet Jackson – Unbreakable (Rhythm Nation/BMG Rights Management), 2015
- The Lumineers – Cleopatra (Dualtone Records), 2016
- Blink-182 – California (Viking Wizard Eyes/BMG Rights Management), 2016
- Frank Ocean – Blonde (Boys Don't Cry), 2016
- Jason Aldean – They Don't Know (Macon Music/Broken Bow Records/BMG Rights Management), 2016
- Metallica – Hardwired... to Self-Destruct (Blackened Recordings), 2016
- Brand New – Science Fiction (Procrastinate! Music Traitors), 2017
- NF – Perception (NF Real Music/Caroline Records), 2017 (considered an independent album despite the involvement of Capitol Christian Music Group, which is owned by Universal)
- XXXTentacion – ? (Bad Vibes Forever), 2018
- Jason Aldean – Rearview Town (Macon Music/Broken Bow Records/BMG Rights Management), 2018
- BTS – Love Yourself: Tear (Big Hit Music), 2018
- BTS – Love Yourself: Answer (Big Hit Music), 2018
- XXXTentacion – Skins (Bad Vibes Forever/Empire Distribution), 2018
- BTS – Map of the Soul: Persona (Big Hit Music), 2019
- NF – The Search (NF Real Music/Caroline Records), 2019
- Trippie Redd – A Love Letter to You 4 (TenThousand Projects), 2019
- BTS – Map of the Soul: 7 (Big Hit Music), 2020
- BTS – Be (Big Hit Music), 2020
- Bad Bunny – El Último Tour Del Mundo (Rimas Entertainment), 2020
- Adele – 25 (XL Recordings/Columbia Records), 2021 (hit #1 on Independent Albums six years after hitting #1 on the Billboard 200, only doing so after an already-mentioned rules change)
- Various Artists – Encanto (Walt Disney Records), 2022
- Bad Bunny – Un Verano Sin Ti (Rimas Entertainment), 2022
- Bad Bunny – Nadie Sabe Lo Que Va a Pasar Mañana (Rimas Entertainment), 2023
- Kanye West and Ty Dolla Sign – Vultures 1 (YZY), 2024
- Taylor Swift – Reputation (Big Machine Records), 2024 (hit #1 on Independent Albums seven years after hitting #1 on the Billboard 200, only doing so after an already-mentioned rules change)
- Bad Bunny – Debí Tirar Más Fotos (Rimas Entertainment), 2025
- Ghost – Skeletá (Loma Vista Recordings), 2025
- Megadeth – Megadeth (Tradecraft/Frontiers/BlkIIBlk), 2026
