= Tod Scott Brody =

Tod Scott Brody (October 23, 1956 – December 22, 2015) was an American film producer, editor, and still photographer who, during the 1980s, was an executive at both Cannon Films and MGM. He was associated with Miramax and the producer Scott Rudin during the 1990s, and was an executive producer on the film Marvin's Room, which starred Meryl Streep, Diane Keaton (Oscar-nomination for her role), Leonardo DiCaprio, and Robert De Niro.

Some of Brody's additional credits include The First Wives Club, Wigstock: The Movie, The Natural, Inspector Gadget, Thir13en Ghosts, Manny & Lo, Flirting with Disaster, Raise the Red Lantern, Great Expectations, as well as the TV shows New York News, Sesame Street, Gullah Gullah Island, What Not to Wear, Helen of Troy, Vietnam War Story, and American Masters.

== Advertising and commercial production ==
Prior to joining Cannon Films in Hollywood as head of post production, Brody worked in advertising and commercial production. After leaving university in 1976, he joined the staff at the ad agency Ted Bates AB in Stockholm as a studio still photographer, shooting everything from people to product photography. He returned to New York a year later where he worked at the in-house production company at Ogilvy & Mather on several accounts most notably, American Express, and then joined Ted Bates in Stockholm once again as a commercial producer working on the Marabou and Apotekarnes accounts.

From 1979 through 1984, he worked at several well-known production companies in New York, producing commercials for a wide range of clients including Volkswagen, Canon, Coppertone, Lincoln Mercury, The U.S. Postal Service, Chemical Bank, Barclay's Bank, Ship n' Shore, Fayva, Gillette, De Beers, Avon, Oil of Olay, WNBC News, L'eggs, 7-Up, Glaxo, Toni, Coleco, Wella Balsam, Lux, Duncan Hines, Post Fruit & Fiber, Weight Watchers, Windex, ABC Television, Fawcett Paperbacks, Keepsake Diamond Engagement Rings, Minute Rice, Goodyear, The American Cancer Society, and Puffs Tissues, as well as Music Videos for Pat Benatar, Kiss, Zebra, Rachel Sweet, Wire Train, and The Bongos "Number With Wings" which was nominated for Best Direction at the 1st MTV Music Awards.

== Vampire Weekend ==
The cover of Vampire Weekend's 2010 album Contra is a Polaroid that Brody said he took during a casting session at Cherbuti Films in NYC during the summer of 1983.

In 2010, former model Ann Kirsten Kennis filed suit against Vampire Weekend and Brody, claiming misuse of the image which she said she believed to be a Polaroid taken by her mother. Her attorney later recanted that claim, saying they did not know what the origin of the photo was. Vampire Weekend then filed suit against Brody who later filed a countersuit against the band. After the initial filings and interrogatories, negotiations continued and ultimately, the suits were settled out of court when Vampire Weekend paid an undisclosed figure to Kennis. Brody ultimately was not a party to the cash settlement.

All litigation by all parties in the Vampire Weekend case was dismissed by Judge Valerie Baker Fairbank of the United States District Court for the Central District of California on August 12, 2011, after the suit was settled out of court.

== Awards ==
In 1997, the producers and executive producers of Marvin's Room received a Christopher Award. First presented in 1949, the Christopher Awards were established by Christopher founder Father James Keller to salute media that "affirm the highest values of the human spirit".
