= Time Crisis with Ezra Koenig =

Internet radio show

Time Crisis
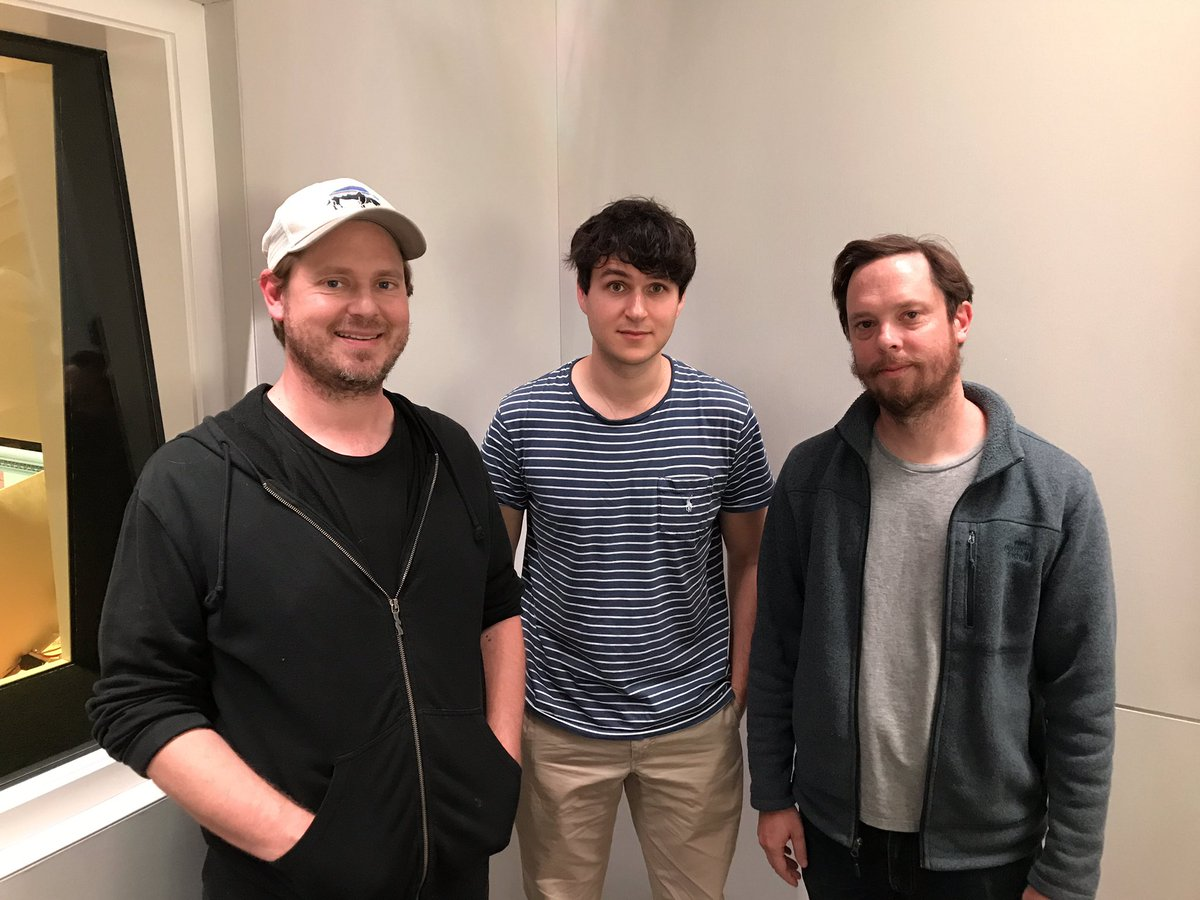
- Genre: News, pop culture, political analysis, Public Affairs, variety
- Running time: 2 hours
- Country of origin: United States
- Language: English
- Home station: Apple Music 1
- Hosted by: Ezra Koenig; Jake Longstreth
- Created by: Ezra Koenig
- Produced by: Jason Richards; Nick Weidenfeld
- Recording studio: Apple Music 1 Studio, Culver City, California
- Original release: July 12, 2015
- No. of seasons: 12
- No. of episodes: 249
- Opening theme: "One of Us" by ABBA
- Website: music.apple.com/au/curator/time-crisis/993269786

Time Crisis (referred to as Time Crisis with Ezra Koenig) is a fortnightly internet radio show hosted by Ezra Koenig and Jake Longstreth. The show began airing on July 12, 2015 on Apple Music's radio service, Beats 1 (now known as Apple Music 1). The show covers a variety of topics, such as politics, corporate food history, 1970s rock music, city living, as well as frequently analyzing the latest in contemporary pop music by contrasting it with music released in another era. In addition to Koenig, a variety of guest hosts have appeared over the show's history, including Jonah Hill, Rashida Jones and Jamie Foxx. Since 2017, Koenig is accompanied by co-host Jake Longstreth, who regularly describes his love for the "tasteful palette" of early 1970s classic rock, plus music from the Grateful Dead, Ween and Guided by Voices.

Time Crisis premiered airing every other Sunday at 12pm (PST). In March 2020, it briefly switched to a weekly schedule due to the rise of remote workers during the COVID-19 pandemic. The bi-weekly schedule resumed in June. On April 16, 2022, the show’s time slot was permanently moved to every other Saturday at 3pm (PST). So far, over 200 episodes have been broadcast, and the show is currently in its eleventh season.

== Format and segments ==
The show follows a general format each episode during its two-hour runtime, usually with listener emails and other discussions in the first half of the show and the Top Five on iTunes at the episode's conclusion.

=== News discussions ===
The most common segment on the call, in which Koenig and his co-hosts discuss the most relevant and obscure news topics of the week, generally relating to politics or current happenings in the world of entertainment.

=== The Time Crisis Mail Bag ===
This has been a regular segment since the show's third season. Initially, the segment began after a fan located Jake Longstreth's personal email. The segment now utilizes the email with ID "8minutecapecod" - a reference to an episode aired in July 2017 where they joked about the prospect of an 8 minute "Cape Cod Kwassa Kwassa" to be played on the next Vampire Weekend tour.

Fans generally send in questions regarding 1970s music and suggest artists to the hosts that they believe are "tasteful" and fit Longstreth's ideal palette. Another popular topic submitted by fans relates to the corporate food history segment of the show.

=== Corporate Food History ===
Frequently, Koenig and guests analyze the current landscape of the corporate food industry, as well as looking back on the history of snack foods across the world. In 2016, Jennifer Saenz, chief marketing executive of the Frito-Lay corporation appeared. Additionally, the show has discussed Subway on multiple episodes and their obscure promotions, such as the Five Dollar Footlong deal. In 2018, the show highly criticized the Lady Dorito proposition by hosting a Lady Dorito's Town Hall, featuring Rashida Jones and Longstreth's wife and filmmaker, Hannah Fidell.

=== Time Crisis Hotline ===
Koenig regularly takes phone calls and has intimate discussions with notable journalists, political commentators, corporate food professionals and celebrities. Notable calls have included Seinfeld theme composer Jonathan Wolff, Reading Rainbow composer Steve Horelick, late Grateful Dead guitarist Bob Weir, Creedence Clearwater Revival frontman John Fogerty, Singer-songwriter Bruce Hornsby and more.

=== Friends of the Show ===
Certain call-in interviewees have been distinguished from amongst the Time Crisis Hotline callers, typically because they call in often or are personally connected with the show's hosts, such as in the cases of Rashida Jones, Koenig's long-time partner, Longstreth's wife Hannah Fidell, music critic Steven Hyden and others. The most notable and frequently reappearing friend of the show is Winter, internationally renowned Scrabble champion and inventor of Starbucking, who is said to have achieved "Platinum Elite Status" as a Friend of the Show, with over a dozen appearances across the show's run. Whereas many Time Crisis Hotline callers leave after their interview, Friends of the Show are commonly invited to finish out their respective episodes, weighing in on the Top Five on iTunes and other segments after their interviews.

=== Jake's Takes ===
A recurring segment in which Longstreth recommends or discusses music, with notable recommendations such as the Grateful Dead, Guided by Voices, Ween, Phish, Neil Young, Small Faces and more. This segment is also used as an opportunity to get Jake's opinion on recent pop hits and dynamic trends within modern music production and instrumentation. Occasionally, Longstreth compiles playlists for Apple Music, notably The Tasteful Palette of Seventies Rock and more recently, Jake's Old Wisdom Playlist.

=== Sweet Chili Heat World Premiere ===
A segment in which the crew premiere fan generated music. Canadian independent musician Patrickworld is a common contributor, creating comedic parodies of contemporary pop hits with lyrics inspired by events and inside jokes that take place on previous episodes of the show. New releases from Ezra's band Vampire Weekend and cohost Jake's band, Mountain Brews, are also commonly premiered.

=== Top Five on iTunes ===
Koenig and Longstreth regularly compare and contrast the iTunes chart from the current week with another music chart from the same week in another year. Notably, the show has regularly jokingly criticized the music of Ed Sheeran, such as his 2017 hit, Shape of You. Koenig and Longstreth commonly refer to the song as Bed Sheets, in reference to one of the song's lines. The music of Imagine Dragons has been the subject of some ridicule on the show, with Koenig affectionately, if mockingly, referring to the band as "Imagination Dragons" across various episodes. Longstreth has also been known to jokingly confuse K-Pop smash hit BTS with the Idaho independent rock band Built To Spill.

=== Gen X Challenges ===
A recurring segment where Longstreth goes head-to-head with Rashida Jones (both members of Gen X) to test who is most familiar with hit songs pulled from the Rock and R&B charts on important dates. Jake is commonly more familiar with the indie rock hits, while Jones tends to dominate the R&B offerings.

=== Other segments ===
Other segments have included New York News and What's Your Day To Day Like?

== Cast ==
=== Core Crisis Crew ===
- Ezra Koenig - Host
- Jake Longstreth - Co-host
- Jason Richards (a.k.a. Seinfeld2000) - Producer, Numbers Crunchable
- Nick Weidenfeld - Producer
- Despot - Co-host Emeritus
- Asher Sarlin (a.k.a. Cousin Asher) - Early Correspondent and second-cousin to Ezra Koenig

== Merchandising ==
There have been a few pieces of official Time Crisis merchandise, which have been available through various giveaways on Twitter. The most common have been T-shirts bearing the phrase, '8 Minute Cape Cod' on the front, with various designs and colors.

Time Crisis Honorary Membership cards have also been given away, which mention the Core Values.

On November 3, 2019, Seinfeld2000 coined the term, 'Popcorn and Raisins' and promoted a line of merchandise based upon this phrase. Shirts were made available the following week.

== See also ==
- Ezra Koenig
- Jake Longstreth
- Vampire Weekend
- Apple Music 1
