= Apple Music 1 =

Radio station operated by Apple Inc

- Los Angeles, California; New York City, New York; London, England; Nashville, Tennessee (Apple Music Country); Paris; Berlin; United States/United Kingdom/France/Germany
- Broadcast area: Over 100 countries

Programming
- Format: Freeform radio, rhythmic contemporary, urban contemporary

Ownership
- Owner: Apple Inc.
- Sister stations: Apple Music Hits; Apple Music Country; Apple Música Uno; Apple Music Club; Apple Music Chill

History
- First air date: June 30, 2015; 11 years ago

Links
- Webcast: Listen Online; - via web browser; - via Music app on iOS, tvOS, watchOS, macOS 10.15 and later; - via iTunes on Windows 7 and later, macOS 10.14 and earlier; - via Apple Music app on Android, Windows 10 and later (Universal Windows Platform); - via TuneIn
- Website: Apple Music Radio; Apple Music Radio on TuneIn

Apple Music 1, previously branded as Beats 1, is a 24/7 music radio station owned and operated by Apple Inc. It is accessible through iTunes or the Apple Music app on a computer, smartphone or tablet, smart speaker (such as the Apple HomePod), and through the Apple Music web browser app.

While a paid subscription is not needed, users are required to sign in with an Apple Account to listen to the free radio stations. Apple Music Radio is streamed at 64 kbit/s and 256 kbit/s, utilising HTTP Live Streaming protocol and the HE-AAC audio codec, powered by StreamS Live Encoder.

Apple Music also operates five sister stations.

== History ==
Logo as Beats 1 (June 2015 – August 2020)

Apple bought audio equipment maker Beats Electronics in 2014, which included the ownership of Beats' former music service Beats Music, and made Beats Music CEO Ian Rogers responsible for the iTunes Radio service. Business Insider later reported that Apple was planning to merge the two services. Apple also hired Zane Lowe as a music curator.

The day of Beats 1's launch, The Guardian revealed that they had been given pre-recorded examples of Beats 1 programming, and said it "suggests an eclectic mix of programming to fill the 24-hours-a-day of broadcasting."

On September 29, 2015, Zane Lowe said he wasn't sure that Apple Music needed Beats 1, but said "I hope that there's a place for it, however I really doubt it."

In December 2015, rumors spread that Apple would expand on the Beats 1 brand and give it sister stations, after Apple registered trademarks for four additional Beats stations.

In September 2016, Apple refreshed the Apple Music interface with the release of iTunes 12.5 and iOS 10. Beats 1 reportedly became harder to get to, due to the clunky interface of iOS 10's Music app.

In March 2017, Apple claimed that Beats 1 was "the biggest radio station in the world" and beat all other music stations in concurrent listeners.

In March 2020, Beats 1 transitioned to remote broadcasting from the respective homes of the radio hosts in light of the coronavirus outbreak.

In May 2020, London headline host Julie Adenuga announced she was leaving Beats 1 after her years on the station since its inception.

On August 18, 2020, Apple announced the rebranding of Beats 1 to Apple Music 1 and the launch of two new radio stations, Apple Music Hits and Apple Music Country, featuring exclusive original shows from the world's top music hosts and artists.

On December 10, 2024, Apple launches three new radio stations, Apple Música Uno, Apple Music Club, and Apple Music Chill, featuring exclusive original shows from the world's top music hosts and artists.

On August 27, 2025, Apple partnered with TuneIn to make all 6 Apple Music Radio stations available on TuneIn. Listening to the stations on the TuneIn platform does not require signing in, making the streams more accessible to listeners who do not have an Apple Account.

== Reception ==
Reception for the Apple-run station has been mixed. Quartz analyzed the track list of songs that were aired on Beats 1 in its second week. "Though Beats 1 is an eclectic mix of genres, some listeners have complained that it plays too much hip-hop." However, they did note that "there is a reasonable amount of diversity..."

Mashable complained of "dynamic-range compression, which squashes the volume range of audio" and also said, "The variety can be a blessing and a curse...it jumps all over the musical spectrum...If I wasn't committed to listening to nothing but Beats 1 for this review, I would have turned it off."

9to5Mac had a generally positive review of the station, saying, "Although Beats 1 is advertised as a 24/7 station, it isn't really true. The schedule is set up on a 12 hour basis, so for the other 12 hours it plays a recording of the last 12 hours...This is frustrating for me, being based in the UK. If I listen in the afternoon and in the following morning, I am likely to hear the same shows repeated...In summary, Beats 1 as a concept is great... It needs some work on the software side and the production side to make it really shine."

Jason Cipriani of Fortune wrote, "I haven't liked every song played on Beats 1, but the personal bond I instantly felt with each DJ has been strong enough for me to resist the urge to go back to a lifeless algorithm."

Billboard said, "the tech community has been heaping praise on Beats 1...Internet-savvy people have fallen head over heels for old-school monoculture."

Rob Price of Business Insider said, "So far, I've loved it. I was never much of a radio listener before, and I've enjoyed the eclectic selection it has thrown up."

Kirk McElhearn wrote, "Beats 1 radio is clearly a loss-leader. Apple has designed it to draw people into Apple Music and get them interested. But the station is designed for just one demographic: the young, pop/rock/hip-hop listener. As such, it's a non starter for a lot of Apple Music customers, and that's a shame."

The Guardian's review heavily criticized Jaden Smith's MSFTS Frequency program and A-Trak's show Day Off, but was generally positive of their other programming.

== Format ==
Apple Music 1 broadcasts a mix of music focusing on new music and artists. Unlike the playlists for the "stations" on iTunes Radio, The Next Web claims, "The overarching aim of Beats 1 is to curate cool new music, whether it be new talent or fresh music from established artists." Brooke Reese hosts a show called Chart, which has music premieres and countdowns of popular music in general on Apple Music. It features both full songs in addition to snippets and previews. However, most shows focus on specific music genres or musical cultures.

Beats 1 aired Apple's annual Apple Music Festival (which was formerly known as the iTunes Festival) as well as interviews with popular American music artists such as Lady Gaga, Bruno Mars and Chance the Rapper. Apple Music Festival was cancelled in 2017. Beats 1 and Apple Music as a whole wanted to focus more on introducing new artists and creating original content.

Apple Music 1 also lets some musicians - such as Lady Gaga, Nicki Minaj, Frank Ocean and the Weeknd - host their own shows on the station. In an interview with Digital Trends' Keith Nelson Jr., Zane Lowe praised the format, saying, "We've been overwhelmed by...how great the artists are at doing it."

On Blackout Tuesday, June 2, 2020, Apple Music 1 (then known as Beats 1) replaced its entire schedule with a stream featuring Black musicians and artists.

== Sister stations ==
In 2015, Apple secured trademarks allowing them to create up to four sister stations for Beats 1. On December 24th, 2024, Apple released 3 new stations: Apple Música Uno, dedicated to Latin music, Apple Music Club, dedicated to dance and techno music, and Apple Music Chill, dedicated to ambient and lo-fi music. They are 24/7. They expanded upon Apple Music Hits and Apple Music Country.

Station Name	Launch date	Genre	Ref
Apple Music 1 (previously Beats 1)	30 June 2015	Rhythmic contemporary, Urban contemporary	
Apple Music Hits	18 August 2020	Hot adult contemporary, Adult hits	
Apple Music Country	18 August 2020	Country music	
Apple Música Uno	10 December 2024	Latin music, Mexican pop music, Tropical music	
Apple Music Club	10 December 2024	Dance radio	
Apple Music Chill	10 December 2024	Ambient music, Chill-out music, Downtempo, Lofi hip-hop, Singer-songwriter, Acoustic music	

== See also ==
- Apple Music
- iTunes Radio
- Blonded Radio
- Memento Mori
- Queen Radio
- Time Crisis with Ezra Koenig
- List of Internet radio stations
