= Contra (album) =

Studio album by Vampire Weekend
- Released: January 11, 2010
- Recorded: 2008–2009
- Studios: Treefort (Dumbo, Brooklyn); Topetitud (Mexico City, Mexico); Avatar (New York City); Hicks and Joralemon (Brooklyn)
- Genres: Indie pop; worldbeat; synth-pop
- Length: 36:40
- Label: XL
- Producer: Rostam Batmanglij

Vampire Weekend chronology
Vampire Weekend (2008)	Contra (2010)	Modern Vampires of the City (2013)

Singles from Contra
- 1. "Horchata" Released: October 5, 2009; 2. "Cousins" Released: November 17, 2009; 3. "Giving Up the Gun" Released: February 19, 2010; 4. "Holiday" Released: June 7, 2010; 5. "White Sky" Released: August 16, 2010; 6. "Run" Released: December 13, 2010

Contra is the second studio album by the American rock band Vampire Weekend, released on January 11, 2010, in the United Kingdom and a day later in the United States by XL Recordings. Produced by band member Rostam Batmanglij, it was preceded by the 2009 singles "Horchata" and "Cousins."

The album was met with critical acclaim and debuted at number one on the US Billboard 200. It was recognized as one of The 200 Best Albums of the Decade by Pitchfork in October 2019.

== Release ==
The release date and album cover for Contra were revealed on September 15, 2009. It was released in the United Kingdom on January 11, 2010. and in the United States on the next day. "Horchata" was released as a free download on October 5, 2009, on the band's website. The first single was "Cousins", accompanied by a 7" single, and a music video. The album was available for streaming on the band's MySpace starting on January 3, 2010. It was also available for streaming from their official website, as of January 5, 2010.

== Music ==
In addition to their established blend of African music influences with indie rock, the album draws from genres such as ska, dancehall, and dance music. It also incorporates the electro-pop and AutoTune found on Batmanglij's Discovery side-project. The Montreal Gazette stated that the album and its predecessor established the band's hybrid worldbeat-pop style. The album has been characterized as pop, "eclectic, intellectual indie rock," and "diffident haute bourgeoisie synth pop." The band made an effort to make their second album a natural expansion on the universe created in their debut album; as a result, Contra covers a far greater gamut of musical influences than their debut album, drawing inspiration from genres such as ska on "Holiday", synth-pop on "Giving Up the Gun", speed rap on "California English" and even rave music on "Run". The production of the album, directed by Rostam Batmanglij, was also different from their former work in that it did not use chamber echo and natural reverb but instead used digital effects to give the album an eighties aesthetic. Other distinguishing features of Contra are the use of backing vocals as textural elements, the debut of Batmanglij as a lead guitarist and more layered drumwork in which fundamental Latin beats are blended with drum machines to create a busier rhythm section.

== Title and lyrics ==
The title Contra is a Romance language (Latin-based) word meaning "against" or "opposite", and is sometimes given as a one-word interjection, used to indicate objection or opposition to an idea or explanation. Ezra Koenig has stated in multiple interviews that the album contains lyrical themes of opposition consistent with its title, and feels it is important to understand that the word "Contra" is a fundamental concept of conflict, without any implication that one side is right or wrong. The lyrics of Contra are also meant to express a desire to be compassionate even towards people and things one disagrees with. He also states the lyrics of Contra deal with reconciling feeling of privilege and guilt, for which he uses the term "first-world guilt". Contra is considered by critics to be instrumental in cementing the cultural significance of Vampire Weekend first formed with their debut record, as Contra deepens and commits to a general attitude of rejecting traditional notions that rock musicians are poor, underprivileged rebels. Whereas their first album brought to light the prejudices against affluence and wealth in rock music, Contra, even in its title, openly argues this stigma.

The lyrics of "I Think Ur a Contra" include the phrase "Complete Control", the title of a Clash single (notably, an influential 1980 triple album by The Clash was entitled Sandinista! after the socialist militancy opposed by the Contras during the Nicaraguan Contra war). This refers partially to the controversy surrounding their punk roots. The title "Diplomat's Son" is a reference to a story singer Koenig wrote while in college about boarding school, though the content lyrically talks about a relationship told by Rostam Batmanglij. The song also features a vocal sample from M.I.A.'s "Hussel". "Holiday" begins with the opening lyrics of Fairport Convention's 1969 rendition of "Matty Groves".

== Artwork and lawsuit ==
The cover of Contra features a candid Polaroid of a woman from 1983. The photo was found by Batmanglij while searching "New York City 1983" on Flickr. Lead singer Koenig states that when he first saw the image, he felt he read "some sort of hesitation" in her face, and that the band discussed at length what her possible age or emotional state could be in the photograph, without ever becoming certain of either. Koenig believed that "wrapped up in her expression is this question: 'How is she feeling?'" and that "maybe she wasn't even really sure at the time."

In an interview, Koenig revealed that the woman pictured on the front cover is "now living in Malibu". Koenig has confirmed that the picture was taken in 1983 by photographer Tod Brody and was chosen as a juxtaposition to the debut album's cover which, while taken in 2006, looks as if it "inhabits the same world". Koenig also referred to the woman as "Kirsten" in a post on Twitter. Koenig likens the image to the Rorschach test as multiple meanings can be extrapolated from just a few signifiers, saying, "Some people get very mad when they see a white blonde girl in a Polo shirt."

On July 15, 2010, Vampire Weekend, along with XL Recordings and Brody, were sued by Ann Kirsten Kennis, the woman who identified herself as the woman on the cover, for $2 million for using the photo without her permission. Kennis has said that the photo was taken while she was "a high-fashion model under contract with prestigious agencies in New York City." In addition, Kennis said that the release forms for the photo that were allegedly signed by Kennis herself, were forged. In a statement released by Kennis' lawyer Alan Neigher, Neigher said that Kennis discovered herself on the cover when her daughter brought home a copy of Contra and showed it to Kennis. Neigher also mentioned that Brody did not take the photo and said that it was taken by Kennis' mother. Despite this claim, Brody claims that he took the photo and says that he had the photo for 26 years until Vampire Weekend discovered it on his Flickr page and bought it for five thousand dollars. Kennis' own former agent, Sue Charney, told Vanity Fair, "To me it is very clearly a Polaroid taken at a casting session." Koenig later responded on the matter, saying "this is the first time any of us have ever been sued, so we're still learning how it works." He added, "There's nothing we can say about it. We're not trying to be mysterious. I imagine in the next few months there'll be plenty to talk about. Given it's our first time, we just want to do it properly."

In December 2010, Vampire Weekend filed their own lawsuit against Brody, which argued that he would be liable for any damages Kennis would receive, due to misrepresentation.

On August 15, 2011, it was announced that Kennis had dropped her lawsuit against XL Recordings and Vampire Weekend after they paid Kennis an undisclosed sum. However, the separate lawsuits against Brody from Kennis and Vampire Weekend were not dropped.

== In popular culture ==
The song "Cousins" was used in various media, such as Peter Rabbit, Tony Hawk: Shred, Pro Evolution Soccer 2011, and The Kids are All Right. The song "Taxi Cab" was used in a scene in the movie Paper Towns.

== Critical reception ==
Professional ratings
Aggregate scores
Source	Rating
AnyDecentMusic?	7.6/10
Metacritic	81/100
Review scores
Source	Rating
AllMusic	4/5 stars
The A.V. Club	A−
Entertainment Weekly	B+
The Guardian	4/5 stars
Los Angeles Times	3.5/4 stars
MSN Music (Consumer Guide)	A
NME	8/10
Pitchfork	8.6/10
Rolling Stone	4/5 stars
Spin	8/10

Contra received acclaim from music critics. Metacritic, which assigns a normalized rating out of 100 to reviews from mainstream critics, reported an average score of 81 based on 39 reviews, described as "universal acclaim". Spin's Jon Dolan wrote that "the balance of classical, rock, and world instrumentation, cagey rhythms, and stunning prettiness isn't just architecturally resplendent, it's reassuringly sweet and strangely moving." AllMusic critic Heather Phares praised the album's "inspired juxtapositions," stating that the band "make Auto-Tune and real live guitars, Mexican drinks, Jamaican riffs and Upper West Side strings belong together." Paul Stokes of NME described Vampire Weekend as "one of the most unique bands on the planet." Dave Simpson of The Guardian stated that the 10 tracks of Contra "will probably be among this year's most played and most joyful tunes." The A.V. Club called it "a career statement, one that’s letting the world know that these Columbia University preps have more than just a fleeting interest in world music," and added that the band "continues to be Talking Heads’ heir apparent, with a good amount of Smiths-like literate pop thrown in."

On December 1, 2010, it was announced that Contra was nominated for a Grammy for "Best Alternative Music Album". Contra was ranked number 6 on Rolling Stone's list of the 30 Best Albums of 2010. Pitchfork placed it at number 6 on its list "The Top 50 Albums of 2010". Consequence of Sound named it the best album of 2010.

In October 2025, Paste ranked the album at number 235 on their "250 Greatest Albums of the 21st Century So Far" list, writing: "More than a decade later, not one song off the album has been forgotten; each has taken a life of its own, equally beloved by fans, proving Contra‘s staying power."

== Commercial performance ==
It is the band's first album to reach number one on the Billboard 200, and the 12th independently distributed album in history to reach the number one spot on the Billboard 200 since Nielsen Soundscan began recording data in 1991, while also being the first independent artist to have done so without ever having signed with a major label, after already established rock bands Radiohead and Pearl Jam and before Arcade Fire's The Suburbs. The album sold 124,000 copies in its first week and was awarded Gold by the RIAA on November 21, 2011, which means it has sold over 500,000 units in the US alone. In 2010. It was awarded a diamond certification from the Independent Music Companies Association which indicated sales of at least 250,000 copies throughout Europe.

== Track listing ==
All lyrics are written by Ezra Koenig, except where noted; all music is composed by Chris Baio, Rostam Batmanglij, Ezra Koenig and Christopher Tomson, except where noted.

Standard edition
No.	Title	Lyrics	Music	Length
1.	"Horchata"	Koenig; Batmanglij		3:26
2.	"White Sky"			2:58
3.	"Holiday"			2:18
4.	"California English"			2:30
5.	"Taxi Cab"		Koenig; Batmanglij	3:55
6.	"Run"			3:52
7.	"Cousins"			2:25
8.	"Giving Up the Gun"			4:46
9.	"Diplomat's Son"	Koenig; Batmanglij		6:01
10.	"I Think Ur a Contra"		Koenig; Batmanglij	4:29
Total length:				36:40

Japanese edition bonus tracks
No.	Title	Length
11.	"Ottoman" (B-side to "Holiday")	4:02
12.	"Giant"	2:50
Total length:		43:32

Japanese limited edition bonus tracks
No.	Title	Length
13.	"California English, Pt. 2"	2:57
14.	"Cousins" (Toy Selectah Mex-More remix)	3:20
15.	"Contramelt B"	4:36
16.	"White Sky" (Basement Jaxx club mix)	6:43
Total length:		61:08

iTunes bonus track
No.	Title	Length
11.	"Giant"	2:50
Total length:		39:30

iTunes pre-order bonus track
No.	Title	Length
12.	"California English, Pt. 2" (B-side to "Cousins")	2:57
Total length:		42:27

'Contra Megamelt' bonus disc
No.	Title	Length
1.	"Contramelt A"	6:11
2.	"Contramelt B"	4:36
3.	"Cousins" (Toy Selectah Mex-More remix)	3:20
Total length:		14:07

== Personnel ==
Vampire Weekend

- Ezra Koenig – lead vocals; guitar (tracks 3, 4, 6, 7); keyboard (track 1); piano (track 10); programming (track 8)
- Rostam Batmanglij – piano; background vocals; vocal harmonies; keyboards; harpsichord; VSS-30; drum; synth; sampler programming; lead vocals (bridge of track 9); guitar (tracks 2–5, 7–10); shakers, hand drum, snares (track 9)
- Christopher Tomson – drums
- Christopher Baio – bass; background vocals (tracks 2, 4); additional synth (track 4)

Additional musicians

- Mauro Refosco – marimbas, rebolo, zabumba, shekere, shakers, auxiliary percussion (track 1)
- Marcus Farrar – shekere, auxiliary percussion (track 1)
- Libby Gery – vocals (track 8)
- Anne Donlon – vocals (tracks 1, 8)
- Nat Baldwin – double bass (tracks 1, 5, 8)
- Jonathan Chu – violin, viola (tracks 1, 4, 5, 9)
- Hamilton Berry – cello (tracks 1, 4, 5, 8–10)
- Seth Rosenfeld – cello (track 8)
- Jesse Novak – additional instrumentation (track 8)
- Jeff Curtin – hand drums (tracks 8, 10); shakers (track 10)
- Shane Stoneback – shaker (track 10)

Production

- Rostam Batmanglij – production; string arrangements; mixing; engineering
- Justin Gerrish – mixing (tracks 1, 3–10); engineering (tracks 1–6, 8–10)
- Shane Stoneback – mixing assistance (track 2); engineering (tracks 1–6, 8–10)
- Fernando Lodeiro – engineering assistance (tracks 1–6, 8–10)
- Tito Fuentes – engineering (track 7)
- Melchor M – engineering assistance (track 7)
- Emily Lazar – mastering
- Joe LaPorta – assistant mastering engineering

Release

- Tod Brody – cover photograph
- Chris Tomson – band photograph
- Rostam Batmanglij – design
- Asher Sarlin – design

== Charts ==
=== Weekly charts ===
Weekly chart performance for Contra
Charts (2010)	Peak position
Australian Albums (ARIA)	2
Austrian Albums (Ö3 Austria)	19
Belgian Albums (Ultratop Flanders)	8
Belgian Alternative Albums (Ultratop Flanders)	4
Belgian Albums (Ultratop Wallonia)	28
Canadian Albums (Billboard)	1
Danish Albums (Hitlisten)	30
Dutch Albums (Album Top 100)	31
Dutch Alternative Albums (Mega Alternative Top 30)	1
Finnish Albums (Suomen virallinen lista)	14
French Albums (SNEP)	15
German Albums (Offizielle Top 100)	15
Greek Albums (IFPI)	9
Irish Albums (IRMA)	4
Irish Independent Albums (IRMA)	8
Italian Albums (FIMI)	98
Japanese Albums (Oricon)	29
New Zealand Albums (RMNZ)	12
Norwegian Albums (VG-lista)	7
Polish Albums (OLiS)	90
Scottish Albums (Official Charts)	3
Spanish Albums (Promusicae)	51
Swedish Albums (Sverigetopplistan)	14
Swiss Albums (Schweizer Hitparade)	26
UK Albums (Official Charts)	3
UK Independent Albums (Official Charts)	1
US Billboard 200	1
US Independent Albums (Billboard)	1
US Top Alternative Albums (Billboard)	1
US Top Rock Albums (Billboard)	1

=== Year-end charts ===
Year-end chart performance for Contra
Chart (2010)	Position
Australian Albums (ARIA)	69
Belgian Albums (Ultratop Flanders)	74
Belgian Alternative Albums (Ultratop Flanders)	33
UK Albums (OCC)	64
US Billboard 200	72
US Independent Albums (Billboard)	2
US Top Alternative Albums (Billboard)	14
US Top Rock Albums (Billboard)	19

== Certifications ==
Certifications and sales for Contra
Region	Certification	Certified units/sales
Australia (ARIA)	Gold	35,000^{^}
Canada (Music Canada)	Gold	40,000^{^}
United Kingdom (BPI)	Gold	100,000^{^}
United States (RIAA)	Gold	541,000
^{^} Shipments figures based on certification alone.

== See also ==
- List of number-one independent albums (U.S)
