= Ezra Koenig =

American rock musician (born 1984)

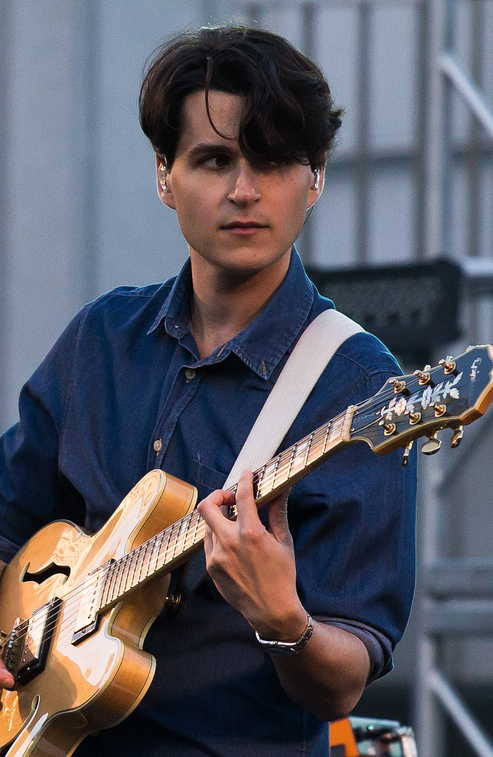
- Koenig in 2013
- Born: Ezra Michael Koenig; April 8, 1984 (age 42); New York City, U.S.
- Education: Columbia University
- Occupations: Singer-songwriter; record producer; television producer; screenwriter; radio personality
- Television: Neo Yokio
- Partner: Rashida Jones (2015–present)
- Children: 1
- Musical career
- Genres: Indie pop; indie rock; baroque pop; worldbeat
- Instruments: Vocals; guitar; piano; percussion; saxophone
- Years active: 2006–present
- Labels: Columbia; XL Recordings
- Member of: Vampire Weekend
- Koenig's speaking voice On Vampire Weekend's song "Cousins"
- Website: vampireweekend.com

Ezra Michael Koenig (/ˌkeɪnɪɡ/ KAY-nig; born April 8, 1984) is an American musician, record producer, and radio personality. He is the lead vocalist, guitarist, and primary songwriter of indie rock band Vampire Weekend. Additionally, Koenig is the creator of the Netflix animated comedy series Neo Yokio and also hosts the Apple Music radio talk show Time Crisis with Ezra Koenig. Time Crisis is airing its tenth season, as of 2024.

Koenig has won two Grammy Awards, both for Best Alternative Music Album (in 2014 and 2020). He has four further nominations, including two for Album of the Year: in 2017 for his production work on Beyoncé's album Lemonade and in 2020 for the Vampire Weekend album Father of the Bride.

== Early life ==
Koenig was born in New York City and is the son of Bobby Bass, a psychotherapist, and Robin Koenig, a set dresser on film and TV productions. He is Jewish, and his family emigrated to the U.S. from Romania and Hungary. His parents lived on the Upper West Side of Manhattan before moving to Glen Ridge, New Jersey shortly after their son's birth. As a young teenager, Koenig attended Buck's Rock Camp, a Montessori-style performing and creative arts camp in Connecticut. He graduated from Glen Ridge High School. Koenig has a younger sister, Emma Koenig (born 1988), who is the author of the books FUCK! I'm in my twenties and Moan, and has written for television and magazines. Koenig began writing music around the age of ten, and his first song ever was titled "Bad Birthday Party".

While attending Columbia University, he ran a blog called Internet Vibes about fashion, existentialism, personal identity, and modern culture. After graduating, he taught English through Teach for America at Junior High School 258 in Brooklyn. Students recalled Koenig bringing his guitar with him to class, despite trying to hide it and his music career. He was described as a laid-back teacher who successfully made bonds with his students. In fall 2007, a deal with XL Recordings cut short Koenig's teaching career.

During his schooling and college years, he was involved in numerous musical projects with Wes Miles, a childhood friend and now current frontman of Ra Ra Riot. Koenig and Miles formed an experimental band, The Sophisticuffs, which was described as "wildly inventive musical work". In 2025, The Sophisticuffs reunited to open for Vampire Weekend at the latter's residency at the Wellmont Theater in Montclair, New Jersey. In 2004, Koenig formed the hip hop group L'Homme Run, which was notable for the comedic track "Pizza Party", with fellow Vampire Weekend band member Chris Tomson; during this time, he also played saxophone for the indie rock band Dirty Projectors, and worked as an intern for The Walkmen.

== Career ==
=== Vampire Weekend ===
In 2005, Koenig formed the indie rock band Vampire Weekend. The name of the group was in reference to an unreleased indie film of the same name that Koenig and his friends produced during a vacation. In the film, Koenig portrayed the protagonist, Walcott, a man hell-bent on escaping Cape Cod as he believed vampires were coming. Many songs from the band's eponymous release made reference to the film.

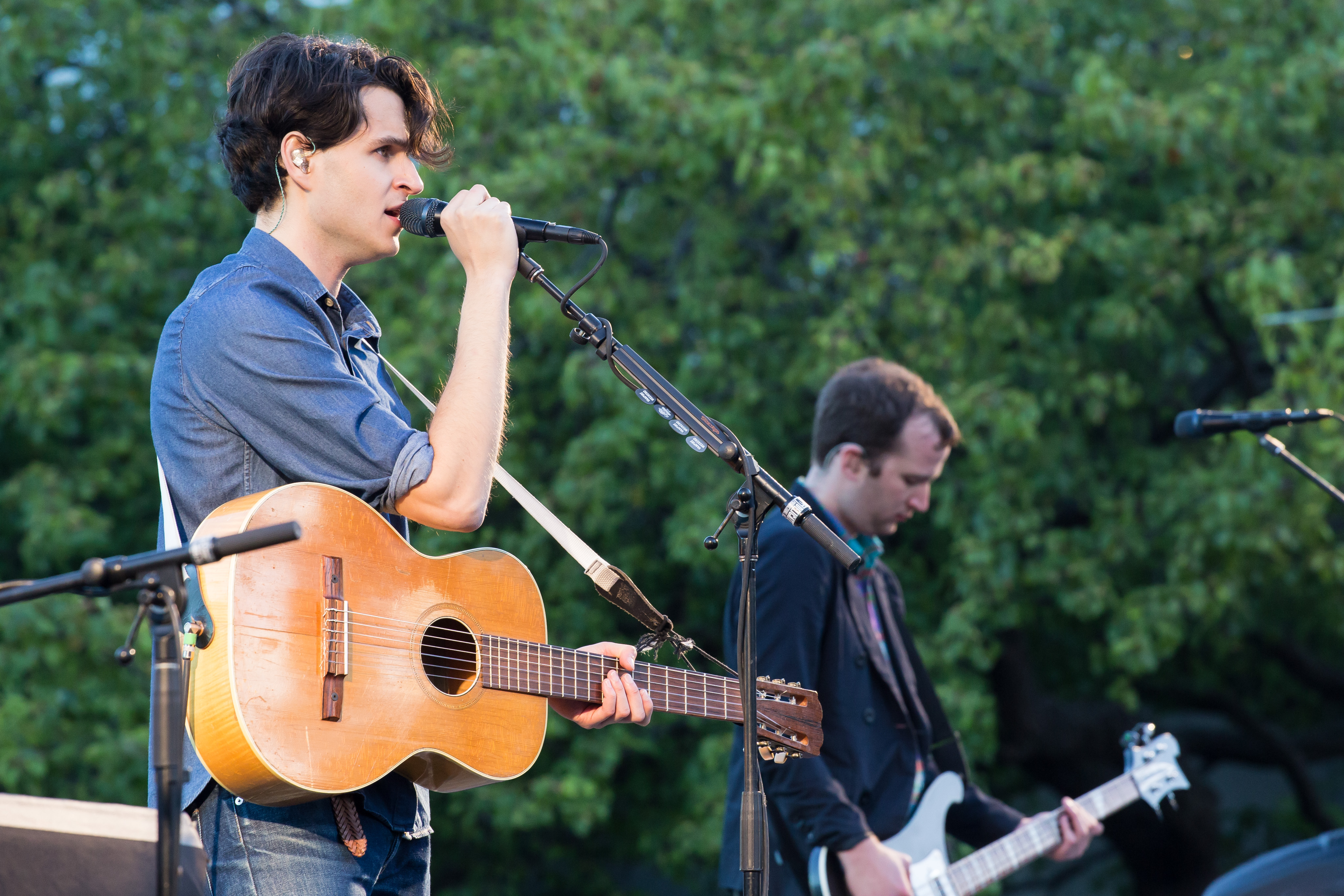
Koenig performing with Vampire Weekend (2014)

Koenig met his bandmates at Columbia University, prior to 2003. After already having met drummer Chris Tomson, Koenig became acquainted with Rostam Batmanglij. The two immediately bonded over Radiohead at a party during freshman year and vowed to start a band one day. Rounding out the group was Chris Baio, Koenig's suite-mate in his sophomore year, with whom he shared a love of Destiny's Child. The group immediately began work, playing their first show in 2006 at a battle of the bands in a campus basement, where they placed third out of four. Later that year, some of their demos appeared online, earning critical acclaim from sites like Stereogum and Pitchfork; this newfound attention led to the group selling out shows and appearing on the cover of Spin without having released an album.

Their eponymous debut album released on January 29, 2008, and by the end of the year they had performed on Saturday Night Live, played at England's Glastonbury festival, and sold nearly half a million albums. The album was self-produced while they were working full-time jobs. Since then, the band have released another four albums: Contra (2010), Modern Vampires of the City (2013), Father of the Bride (2019), and Only God Was Above Us (2024).

The band has been nominated for multiple Grammy Awards. In 2011, Contra was nominated for Best Alternative Music Album, but Brothers by The Black Keys won the award. In 2014, Modern Vampires of the City was nominated in the category and, this time, the band won the award. Following the win, Koenig exclaimed, "I'm the pre-eminent Ezra of my time, and when I die, then we can talk about who comes next." In 2020, Father of the Bride earned the band a second win for Best Alternative Music Album and a first nomination for Album of the Year. "Harmony Hall" was nominated for Best Rock Song.

=== Time Crisis ===
In 2015, Koenig began hosting his own podcast on Apple Music. The show, Time Crisis, features Koenig with co-host Jake Longstreth, an American painter, musician, and internet radio personality. Each episode lasts two hours, during which Koenig and company discuss diverse topics such corporate snack food history, the tasteful palette of ’70s rock (with a focus on the Grateful Dead), portmanteaus, and respond to emails from listeners. Often, the show ends with The Top Five where Koenig and Longstreth compare the top five songs on Apple Music this week to that of a week from the past relevant to the discourse of the episode.

Jonah Hill, Rashida Jones, Mark Ronson, Florence Welch, Jamie Foxx, Tim Heidecker, James Corden, and Koenig's sister Emma Koenig have appeared as guests on the internet radio show.

The show debuted on July 12, 2015, and new episodes air fortnightly. The show is in its eighth season.

=== Neo Yokio ===
Following a hiatus from Vampire Weekend, Koenig wrote and produced an animated comedy-adventure series about a depressive, demon-slaying playboy voiced by Jaden Smith. The series, Neo Yokio, debuted on Netflix in September 2017. The show was written and produced in 2015, with the final sound mix being completed in January 2016; however, due to issues with Fox, the show was postponed until finally being picked up by Netflix.

Neo Yokio is presented in the style of an anime series. However, in an interview with Rolling Stone magazine, Koenig stated that he believes the show is not a traditional anime: "First of all, out of respect for true anime, I've always called Neo Yokio 'anime-inspired' – it's a hybrid. But I've always been a fan of anime, and I always wanted to do something that was kind of an homage to it. Maybe a loving parody. Initially the people I was working with thought I should be the voice of the main character, but I was, like, 'I just spent seven years being the frontman of something, using my voice all the time. What I need right now is to slip into the background of something.'"

Upon release, the show's first season received mixed reviews from critics, earning a 54% score on Rotten Tomatoes. Shannon Liao of The Verge criticised the show's story and voice-acting, writing that "the initial glamor of the backdrops and talent involved wears off fast. It has awful voice acting, and a pointless, predictable story that’s only surprising because it’s so willing to hit the bottom of the barrel." The New York Times gave the show a more optimistic review, stating that "if a defensive reading of the line, 'Yes, my girlfriend broke up with me to take a finance job in San Francisco,' makes you chuckle, 'Neo Yokio' may be for you."

On an episode of Time Crisis in early 2018, Koenig spoke about the future of Neo Yokio, hinting that "Neo's not dead." However, Netflix canceled the show the following month after one season and a Christmas special.

== Other projects and appearances ==
In 2009, Koenig provided vocals on the song "Carby" on LP, the debut album from Discovery, a group which features Vampire Weekend keyboardist Rostam Batmanglij and Ra Ra Riot vocalist Wes Miles. In the same year, he appeared on "Warm Heart of Africa" by the Very Best, "Pyromiltia" by Theophilus London, "I Could Be Wrong" by Chromeo and "Dynamo" by Abd al Malik.

In 2012, Koenig performed "I Think Ur a Contra" with Angélique Kidjo in her PBS special. He appeared and provided vocals in the music video for Duck Sauce's "Barbra Streisand". His recording of the song "Papa Hobo", by Paul Simon, was included as part of the soundtrack for Max Winkler's film Ceremony.

In 2013, Koenig was featured on the song "Jessica" by Major Lazer.

In 2014, Koenig was featured on "Ezra's Interlude" by Chromeo, as well as "New Dorp, New York" by SBTRKT. He also appeared in the HBO drama series Girls and Haim's music video for "My Song 5" featuring A$AP Ferg, and performed the voice of Ryland on the animated series Major Lazer. At the 86th Academy Awards, Koenig accompanied Karen O on backing vocals and acoustic guitar for her performance of the Oscar-nominated song "The Moon Song" from the film Her.

In 2016, Koenig was credited as a writer and producer on the song "Hold Up" by Beyoncé. Due to these contributions, Koenig was nominated for a Grammy Award for the album Lemonade. In January and April 2016, Koenig vocally supported political candidate Bernie Sanders by performing at a number of his rallies.

In 2017, Koenig made an appearance in the music video Charli XCX's "Boys".

In 2018, Koenig was credited as a songwriter and producer on the single "I Promise You" by James Corden, from the film Peter Rabbit, which also prominently featured Vampire Weekend's songs. His demo of the song was also released.

In February 2020, Vampire Weekend performed at a rally for U.S Presidential Candidate Bernie Sanders.

In 2022, Koenig was credited as a co-writer and producer of Liam Gallagher's song "Moscow Rules" from his album C'mon You Know. He also plays multiple instruments across the album.

Also in 2022, Koenig was featured as a vocalist in Phoenix's song “Tonight,” which is the third single from the band's seventh album, Alpha Zulu.

On August 11, 2024, he performed at the 2024 Summer Olympics closing ceremony with Phoenix, Angèle, Vannda and Kavinsky.

== Influences ==
Since the age of 9, Koenig has been an admirer of music. In a 2014 interview with Vulture, he stated, "My dad is a massive music fan, so even just growing up in the house, he was buying new cool music, up through when I was born. So I was very familiar with the Ramones, Run DMC, Blondie—core New York music. My parents would often play the Ramones song, "We’re a Happy Family", so I remember when I was 9 or 10, learning the lyrics and trying to understand." By the time he got to high school, Koenig's taste had slightly changed: "I had some older friends who were really obsessed with hip-hop, De La Soul, Tribe Called Quest. There’s something about Midnight Marauders; it feels like a late night in the city album."

Koenig is also a self-professed fan of bands such as the Grateful Dead and Sublime, who he believes largely influenced his musical taste.

== Personal life ==
In August 2018, Koenig's girlfriend, actress Rashida Jones, gave birth to their son. In a 2024 interview published in The Guardian, Koenig referred to Jones as his wife. In a 2024 interview published in People, Koenig said that the couple are “married in the eyes of God.”
