= Chris Baio =

American musician (born 1984)

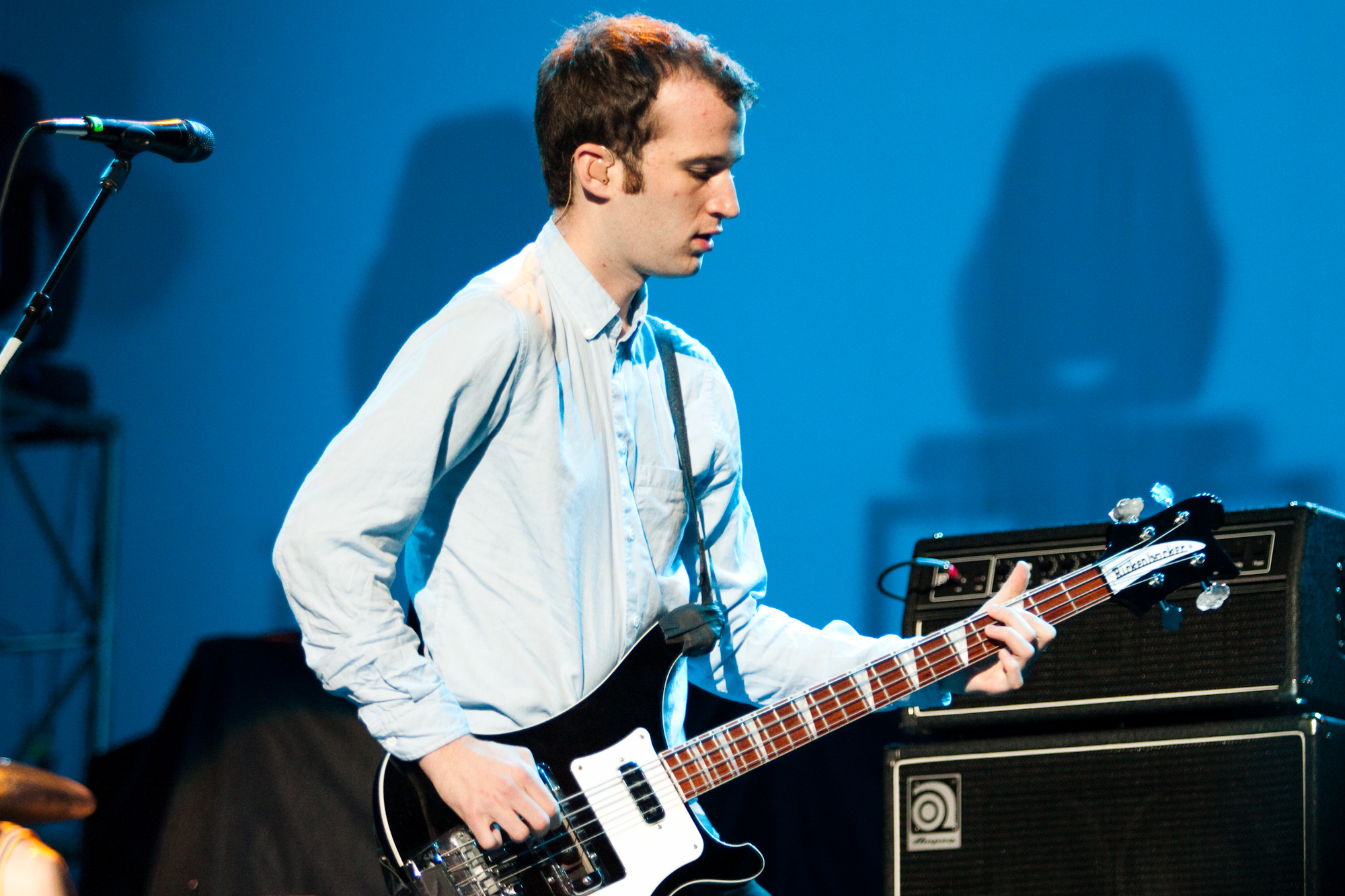
- Chris Baio on December 11, 2009

Background information
- Born: Christopher Joseph Baio; October 29, 1984 (age 41); Bronxville, New York, U.S.
- Genres: Worldbeat, indie rock
- Occupations: Musician, DJ
- Instruments: Bass guitar, vocals, guitar, keyboards
- Member of: Vampire Weekend; C.Y.M.
- Spouse: Katelyn Doyle (m. 2012)

Christopher Joseph Baio (born October 29, 1984) is an American musician, best known for being the bassist for the New York City-based indie rock band Vampire Weekend. He also releases as a record producer under the mononym Baio, and his debut solo album The Names was released through Glassnote Records on September 18, 2015.

In 2025, Baio and Fort Romeau's Michael Greene started a collaborative project called C.Y.M. The duo released their debut album, C.Y.M. in October that same year.

== Life ==
Baio was turned on to music at an early age, purchasing his first album at the age of seven and going to his first concert, a live performance by the band Cracker, at the age of nine. Baio said that, as a child, he would go to sleep with Doolittle by Pixies playing.

Baio attended Columbia University in New York, majoring in Russian and Eurasian Regional studies and minoring in Math, graduating in May 2007. He served as College Rock Music Director of WBAR during his time at school. Before graduating college and while recording Vampire Weekend's first album, Baio had planned to teach math for Teach for America for two years, however the success of the band led him to declining the position.

He is a first cousin once removed of actor Scott Baio, who played Chachi Arcola on Happy Days and Charles on the 1980s television program Charles in Charge. He is also a cousin of actor Jimmy Baio. In April 2013, Baio discovered that he is related to Steve Buscemi. Baio's first cousin is San Francisco Giants outfielder Harrison Bader. His father is originally from Bensonhurst, Brooklyn.

== Musical career ==
During high school, Baio was lead guitarist, songwriter, and vocalist in a local Bronxville, NY, band known as Underrated.

Baio was in a country-influenced band called the Midnight Hours with Vampire Weekend's current drummer, Chris Tomson at Columbia University, where the rest of the Vampire Weekend band members were also attending. Following the breakup of Midnight Hours, Baio was working as a DJ as a side job until Vampire Weekend was created. The band members got straight to rehearsing for their first gig, which was booked before the band had even started practicing.

A year after Baio graduated, Vampire Weekend's self-titled debut album was released. It peaked at number 15 on the UK Album Chart and number 17 on the Billboard 200. Additionally, one of the album's singles, "A-Punk" was voted the 4th best song of 2008 by Rolling Stone magazine in addition to being featured in the film Step Brothers with Will Ferrell and John C. Reilly, and the popular UK television series The Inbetweeners. On June 14, 2008, they played Central Park SummerStage in Manhattan, and a benefit for democracy in October.

In January 2010, the band's second album, Contra, was released. It reached number one on the Billboard 200 and on January 9, 2010 the band appeared on MTV Unplugged. Then on March 6, 2010, the band appeared as the musical guests on Saturday Night Live; the second time the band had appeared on the show.

Baio released his debut solo EP, "Sunburn," under his DJ name, Baio on May 21, 2012. Rolling Stone said, "A three-track set of undulating dance grooves that capture a vibe the bassist describes as 'hopeful melancholy,' it's the culmination of a hobby Baio took up half a decade ago as a student at Columbia University in New York." Baio drew a lot of inspiration from electronic and dance music and spent much of the past year on DJing due to Vampire Weekend's light tour schedule, and he said, "I'd lock myself in my little office in my apartment with CDJs and a mixer and just practice mixing all day. I did that quite a bit while we were touring the last record and realized when we finished touring that I really wanted to pursue it." His first completed track was "Sunburn Modern," which was inspired by a "nasty, modern art"-looking sunburn he got from a trip to Mexico with his girlfriend.

His solo album, titled The Names, was released in 2015. His sophomore album, Man of the World, was released on June 30, 2017. On January 29, 2021 Baio released his third solo album, Dead Hand Control. Though his earlier albums were pleasantly energetic – this one took a deeper and darker turn, being several octaves below his normal art.

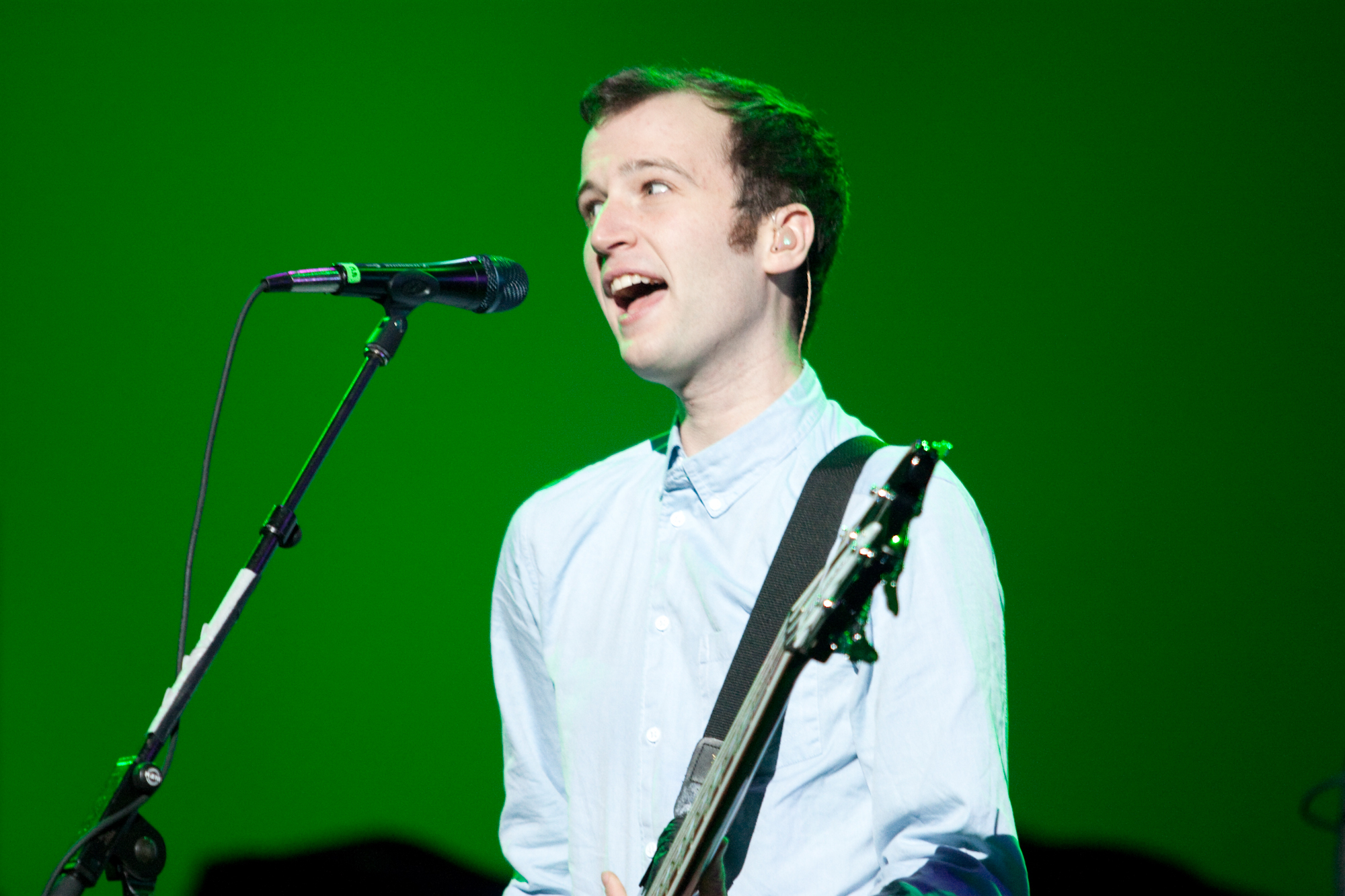
Baio with Vampire Weekend

A Simlish rendition of his song The Key Is Under The Mat was featured in The Sims 4.

== Musical influences ==
In an interview with the British newspaper column "Hugs and Kisses 23" Baio said, in reply to the question 'what his favorite album of all time was', "Queen's, Classic Queen. I still like it. It could be Greatest Hits. It's the one with 'Bohemian Rhapsody' on it. They were selling it on MTV with an ad trailer featuring the guys from Wayne's World singing along to it in the car. I was maybe seven, and I was like, I really like that song, so I'll get that album."

Vampire Weekend also used The Beatles as an influence saying to Columbia University's alumni journalist "they played extremely popular music but at the same time drew upon Eastern and Western sources. Whereas today, rock music has killed itself by being so white bread. We're trying to mix sounds that are old and new and sounds that are Western and that are not Western. I think that's our vibe." The band also has taken its style from a form of music called Afrobeat which is a mix between jazz, funk, and highlife, all cemented together by heavy traditional African influences.

== Equipment ==
Baio's primary bass is an old hollow-body Kustom brand bass guitar in teal. He also is frequently seen using a Rickenbacker 4003 bass guitar and an Epiphone Jack Casady bass guitar. In September 2019 on the Stephen Colbert show, Baio played a Kala Wanderer U-Bass, which is a “short-scale” travel bass that looks like a ukulele but sounds like a standard bass guitar.

== Discography ==
Solo studio albums

- The Names (2015)
- Man of the World (2017)
- Dead Hand Control (2021)

Solo EPs

- Sunburn (2012)
- Mira (2013)
- ON&ON&ON&ON / Missive (2014)

With Vampire Weekend

- Vampire Weekend (2008)
- Contra (2010)
- Modern Vampires of the City (2013)
- Father of the Bride (2019)
- Only God Was Above Us (2024)

With C.Y.M.

- C.Y.M. (2025)
- My Whole World (2026, EP)

== See also ==
- Vampire Weekend
