= Chris Tomson =

American singer, songwriter and musician (born 1984)

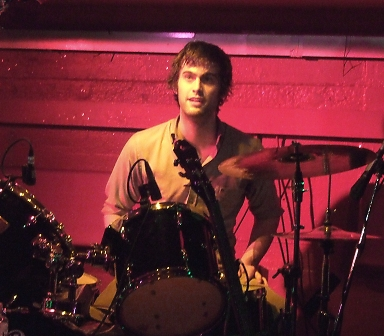
- Tomson performing with Vampire Weekend in 2007

Background information
- Born: Christopher William Tomson; March 6, 1984 (age 42)
- Origin: Upper Freehold Township, New Jersey
- Genres: Indie rock; indie pop; art pop; baroque pop; worldbeat; alternative rock
- Occupations: Musician; singer; songwriter
- Instruments: Drums; percussion; vocals; guitar; piano
- Years active: 2006-present
- Labels: XL; 30th Century Records; Columbia
- Member of: Vampire Weekend; Dams of the West; Taper's Choice
- Website: http://www.vampireweekend.com/

Christopher William Tomson (born March 6, 1984), commonly known by his initials "CT", is an American singer, songwriter and musician, best known as the drummer for New York–based indie rock band Vampire Weekend. He is also the lead vocalist and guitarist for a side project called Dams of the West, for which he writes and records the entirety of its music.

== Background ==
Tomson grew up on a farm in the Imlaystown section of Upper Freehold Township, New Jersey, and later recorded parts of Vampire Weekend's first album there. His father is an engineer whose family is of Irish and Ukrainian heritage (he studied abroad in Ireland in college). His mother is an administrator whose family is of English and German heritage. He graduated from the Peddie School as a salutatorian and then from Columbia University where he studied economics and music. Tomson enjoys photography and is an avid soccer fan; his favorite club is Tottenham Hotspur. Tomson is also a huge fan of Phish, The Band, and the Grateful Dead. After living in the Greenpoint neighborhood of Brooklyn for several years, he moved to Los Angeles in 2019.

In 2008, he was involved in a hit-and-run incident in London after the Shockwaves NME Awards. He was taken to hospital to be treated for neck injuries but was released with no notable injuries.

== Musical career ==
Prior to forming Vampire Weekend, Tomson played with Ezra Koenig in the "serious" rap group called L’Homme Run.

Tomson met the members of Vampire Weekend while attending Columbia University—he took music classes with Rostam Batmanglij and started the group in their senior year. The name of the group comes from the movie of the same name that Ezra Koenig and his friends made over a summer vacation. They self-produced their first album after graduation while concurrently working full-time jobs (Tomson worked as an archivist for a record label). Their next three albums—Contra (2010), Modern Vampires of the City (2013), and Father of the Bride (2019)—all reached number one on the US album charts.

In February 2017, Tomson released his first solo album, Youngish American, under the pseudonym Dams of the West.
