= Bitte Orca =

2009 album by Dirty Projectors

Studio album by Dirty Projectors
- Released: June 9, 2009
- Genres: Indie rock; art pop; progressive pop
- Length: 41:08
- Label: Domino
- Producers: David Longstreth; Nicolas Vernhes

Dirty Projectors chronology
Rise Above (2007)	Bitte Orca (2009)	Mount Wittenberg Orca (2010)

Bitte Orca is the fifth studio album by American rock band Dirty Projectors, released on June 9, 2009, by Domino Recording Company. The title, combining "bitte", the German word for "please", and orca, bears no literal meaning other than frontman David Longstreth stating that he liked the way the words sounded together. Longstreth notes that the music contained within the album "felt very [much] about colors, and their interaction", and that the music was written with the notion of the band, as a whole, in mind.

Two of the album's tracks, "Temecula Sunrise" and "Cannibal Resource", appeared on the subsequent EP release, Temecula Sunrise, alongside two new songs.

The album peaked at number 65 on the Billboard 200 and number 12 on the Independent Albums chart. As of April 4, 2012, the album has sold 85,000 copies in the U.S.

Bitte Orca is the only Dirty Projectors album to feature Angel Deradoorian as an official band member; she did not contribute to the band's following Swing Lo Magellan, and left in 2012.

== Artwork ==
The album's artwork was designed by Rob Carmichael, who runs the independent label Catsup Plate Records and has created album art for other artists such as Animal Collective and Atlas Sound, with direction from Dave Longstreth. Carmichael believed "in some ways the idea was to evoke old-school European paintings and the female form". The artwork reuses the blue and red visual motif featured on the art for their 2004 release, Slaves' Graves and Ballads, but features band members Amber Coffman and Angel Deradoorian instead; this motif would later be used again for the band's album Lamp Lit Prose. Regarding Coffman and Deradoorian's roles on the album, Longstreth states:

"One of my ideas for the album was to start, sort of, as a gift or homage to each one, to try to explode their temperaments into individual numbers. I was trying to widen the temperament of the band a little bit, to be Dirty Projectors but also have these new, different sort of flowers within the bouquet of the sound."

The photoshoot that spawned the photo utilized in the artwork also produced the photo featured on the back (consisting of Longstreth facing Friedrich Nietzsche).

== Release ==
Bitte Orca is Dirty Projectors' first album for Domino Records. The album was released in five different formats: digital download; standard compact disc; a limited edition two-CD, which contains the original album plus the five-track "Stillness Is the Move" single; vinyl LP; and a limited edition cassette. All hard copy releases included a free digital download of the album.

The album leaked to the internet two months before its official release.

A music video for "Stillness Is the Move", directed by Matthew Lessner, was released on June 25, 2009.

An expanded edition of the album was released on September 28, 2010, featuring a bonus disc consisting of B-sides, an acoustic set recorded at New York's Other Music, and a cover of Bob Dylan's "As I Went Out One Morning." In 2020, the record club Vinyl Me, Please. released a limited edition double album version on colored vinyl, which contained the original track listing on the first disc and selected bonus tracks from the 2010 expanded edition on the second.

== Reception ==
Professional ratings
Aggregate scores
Source	Rating
AnyDecentMusic?	7.9/10
Metacritic	85/100
Review scores
Source	Rating
AllMusic	5/5 stars
The A.V. Club	A
Entertainment Weekly	A−
The Guardian	4/5 stars
MSN Music (Consumer Guide)	B+
NME	8/10
Pitchfork	9.2/10
Q	4/5 stars
Rolling Stone	3/5 stars
Spin	8/10

=== Press ===
Reviewing the version of Bitte Orca which leaked onto the internet two months before its official release date, Amrit Singh of Stereogum called the album "stunning" and "[a] pay-off for joining Dave Longstreth on his years of recorded self-discovery". Prefix called the album "a breakthrough, which filters their left-field avant aesthetics through more conventional song structures".

Paul Thompson of Pitchfork awarded the album a 9.2 upon initial release, calling it "a testament to the leaps and bounds Longstreth has made as a songsmith and Dirty Projectors have made as a band". Pitchfork eventually ranked Bitte Orca at number 2 on its 2009 "Best Of" list (after Merriweather Post Pavilion by Animal Collective), and 56 on its list of the Top 200 Albums of the 2000s, as well as naming the track "Stillness Is the Move" the second best track of 2009 (after "My Girls", also by Animal Collective). Rolling Stone ranked the same track at 85 in its 100 Best Songs of the Decade.

Time magazine listed the album as the "Number 2 Album of 2009" in the article "The Top 10 Everything of 2009", with writer Josh Tyrangiel noting that "the job of a music critic is essentially to describe music. For the past few years, the job of Dirty Projectors mastermind Dave Longstreth has been to make the critic's job undoable".

The album placed 12th in The Wire's annual critics' poll. Rhapsody ranked it number 25 on their list of the best albums of 2009.

Review aggregator website AnyDecentMusic? correlated 19 reviews resulting in an ADM Rating of 8.0.

The album was also included in the 2011 edition of the book 1001 Albums You Must Hear Before You Die.

=== Musicians ===
Commenting on the notion of "genre" in an interview with Amanda Petrusich for Pitchfork, Ed Droste of Grizzly Bear discussed Bitte Orca shortly after its release:

"Someone was asking me about what I was listening to and I was saying 'Oh, Dirty Projectors, I love the new album,' and they were like, 'Well what kind of music is it?' and I just stopped dead in my tracks and literally didn't know how to describe it. At first I was embarrassed because I didn't know how to describe it, but then I was like, this is what's so amazing about a lot of music now. There are so many different things and there's so much going on and 'Bitte Orca' is so distinctly Dirty Projectors that I didn't even know how to begin to describe what genre it is, you know? What would one categorize it as? So I find it hard lately to label things as indie or pop or folk or give it some sort of categorization."

== Track listing ==
All tracks are written by David Longstreth, except where noted.

No.	Title	Writer(s)	Length
1.	"Cannibal Resource"		3:55
2.	"Temecula Sunrise"		5:05
3.	"The Bride"		2:49
4.	"Stillness Is the Move"	Longstreth; Amber Coffman	5:14
5.	"Two Doves"		3:42
6.	"Useful Chamber"		6:28
7.	"No Intention"		4:17
8.	"Remade Horizon"		3:55
9.	"Fluorescent Half Dome"		5:45
Total length:			41:08

== Personnel ==
The following people contributed to Bitte Orca:

Dirty Projectors

- David Longstreth – producer, mixing, drum recording, performer
- Amber Coffman – performer
- Angel Deradoorian – performer
- Brian McOmber – drum recording, performer

Additional musicians

- Nat Baldwin – bass (2, 6)
- Haley Dekle – additional vocal harmonies (1–3, 8, 9)
- Jordan Dykstra – string quartet director, viola (4, 5, 8, 9)
- Caleb Russell – violin (4, 5, 8, 9)
- Andrew Todd – violin (4, 5, 8, 9)
- Anna Fritz – cello (4, 5, 8, 9)

Production

- Robby Moncrieff – recording engineer
- Nicolas Vernhes – additional production, mixing
- Joe Lambert – mastering

Artwork

- Jason Frank Rothenberg – original cover photograph
- Rob Carmichael – album layout
