= Dirty Projectors (album) =

Studio album by Dirty Projectors
- Released: February 21, 2017
- Recorded: 2016
- Studio: Various: "Ivo Shandor" (Los Angeles, California); The Norman Ave Bunker (Brooklyn, New York); The Magic Mix (Miami, Florida); Profit House 1 (New York City, New York); Sunset Sound (Los Angeles); The Nash Room (Brooklyn); The House (Hudson, New York); Brown Sugar Studios (New York City); Dberg Studios (Burbank, California); Studio City Sound (Studio City, California)
- Genres: Art pop; electronica; alternative R&B; experimental pop
- Length: 48:14
- Label: Domino
- Producers: David Longstreth; Tyondai Braxton (Note: Additional production on tracks 1–3, 7 and 8)

Dirty Projectors chronology
About to Die EP (2012)	Dirty Projectors (2017)	Lamp Lit Prose (2018)

Singles from Dirty Projectors
- 1. "Keep Your Name" Released: September 22, 2016; 2. "Little Bubble" Released: January 5, 2017; 3. "Up in Hudson" Released: January 18, 2017; 4. "Cool Your Heart" Released: February 7, 2017

Dirty Projectors is the seventh album by the American experimental rock group Dirty Projectors, released by Domino Records on February 21, 2017.

== Background ==
Following the release of Dirty Projectors' album Swing Lo Magellan in 2012, David Longstreth began to suffer from writer's block, and soon thereafter also ended his relationship with bandmate Amber Coffman, coinciding with her departure from the band. Following a "long tumultuous period", Longstreth and Coffman reconciled and recorded Coffman's debut solo album City of No Reply in 2015; after the completion of the album, however, Coffman stated that "things took an unfortunate downturn [...] at which time we stopped speaking". From 2013 to 2016, Dirty Projectors laid mostly dormant while Longstreth relocated to Los Angeles, in that time working with Rihanna, Kanye West, and Paul McCartney on the song "FourFiveSeconds", contributing orchestral arrangements to Joanna Newsom's Divers (2015), and producing and co-writing several songs from Solange's A Seat at the Table (2016). Longstreth has stated that working with West and Solange was like "hitting a reset [he] really needed", and that it allowed him to "stay focused on the emotional places that first inspired the song and not get carried away with the music that spun out from there".

Dirty Projectors thematically revolves around the breakup of Longstreth and Coffman and the ensuing hiatus in the band's activities. It utilizes electronic sounds more prominently than the band had since their 2005 album The Getty Address, including synthesizers, usage of autotune on some tracks, and prominent usage of samples on the songs "Keep Your Name" and "Death Spiral". The album was recorded at various studios throughout 2016, among which being a former cabinet factory which Longstreth dubbed "Ivo Shandor". In the absence of his bandmates, Longstreth opted to feature the contributions of several guest musicians throughout the album, among which include composer and former Battles member Tyondai Braxton, multi-instrumentalist and producer Rob Moose, and R&B singer and former Danity Kane member Dawn Richard.

== Reception ==
Professional ratings
Aggregate scores
Source	Rating
AnyDecentMusic?	7.4/10
Metacritic	77/100
Review scores
Source	Rating
AllMusic	4/5 stars
The A.V. Club	B+
Entertainment Weekly	A−
The Guardian	4/5 stars
The Independent	2/5 stars
The Observer	4/5 stars
Pitchfork	7.8/10
Q	4/5 stars
Rolling Stone	4/5 stars
Uncut	9/10

Dirty Projectors received generally positive reviews from music critics, holding a rating of 77 out of 100 on the review aggregator website Metacritic. Writing for The Guardian, Gwilym Mumford regards how "the band venture[s] further into the futuristic R&B of 2012's Swing Lo Magellan [...] Longstreth's labyrinthine vocal lines criss-cross with glitchy snatches of samples, and without the lightness of Coffman and [Angel] Deradoorian's doo-wop harmonies, things occasionally get a little dense". Will Hermes, in his review of the album for Rolling Stone, called the album "as dazzing, inventive and soulful as anything [Longstreth]'s done", noting its "freaky cyber-crooning, outrageous beats, startling sample flips and tasty guitar heroics". He goes on to praise the work of Longstreth's collaborators for the album, singling out Jimmy Douglass for his engineering work "help[ing] craft a masterpiece of post-Auto-Tune vocal processing", and Solange for her co-writing work on the "island vibe" of "Cool Your Heart".

== Track listing ==
No.	Title	Lyrics	Music	Length
1.	"Keep Your Name"	David Longstreth	Longstreth; Tyondai Braxton	4:30
2.	"Death Spiral"	Longstreth	Longstreth; Braxton; Bernard Hermann	5:08
3.	"Up in Hudson"	Longstreth; Ewan MacColl	Longstreth; MacColl; David Ginyard; Braxton	7:31
4.	"Work Together"	Longstreth	Longstreth	4:24
5.	"Little Bubble"	Longstreth; Teresa Eggers	Longstreth	5:05
6.	"Winner Take Nothing"	Longstreth	Longstreth	4:49
7.	"Ascent Through Clouds"	Longstreth	Longstreth; Braxton; Ryan Beppel	6:56
8.	"Cool Your Heart" (featuring Dawn Richard)	Longstreth; Solange Knowles	Longstreth; Knowles; Braxton	3:49
9.	"I See You"	Longstreth	Longstreth; Elon Rutberg	6:05
Total length:				48:14

iTunes bonus track
No.	Title	Lyrics	Music	Length
10.	"Little Bubble" (edit)	Longstreth; Eggers	Longstreth	3:28

- "Keep Your Name" contains samples of "Sheathed Wings", written and performed by Dan Deacon, and "Impregnable Question" from Dirty Projectors' Swing Lo Magellan.
- "Death Spiral" contains a sample of "Scene d'Amour", composed by Bernard Hermann from his score album for Vertigo.

== Personnel ==
Credits are adapted from the album's liner notes.

Dirty Projectors

- David Longstreth – producer, mixing, vocals, beats, guitar (1–3, 5, 7, 9), Rhodes (1, 2, 4, 5, 7), piano (1, 2, 4, 8), synth (1, 2, 6–9), string arrangement (4, 5, 7, 9), bass (2, 5, 7), Wurlitzer (2, 4), horn arrangement (3), ARP (4), organ (6, 8), artwork, design

Additional musicians

- Ryan Beppel – string arrangement (7)
- Tyondai Braxton – modular synth (1–3, 7, 8)
- Lamar "Mars" Edwards – Hammond organ (9)
- David Ginyard – bass (3)
- Juliane Gralle – trombone (3, 7), bass trombone (3), tuba (3)
- Clarice Jensen – cello (4, 5, 7, 9)
- Mike Daniel Johnson – drums (2, 3, 5)
- Elizabeth Lea – trombone (5)
- Daniel Luna – güira (8)
- Rob Moose – violin (4, 5, 7, 9)
- Francisco Javier Paredes – bongos (8)
- Mauro Refosco – percussion (1–4, 6, 8, 9), marimba (6)
- Dawn Richard – vocals (8)
- Ben Russell – violin (4, 5, 7, 9)
- Todd Simon – trumpet (3, 8), euphonium (3), flugelhorn (8)
- Nadia Sirota – viola (4, 5, 7, 9)
- Tracy Wannomae – tenor saxophone (3), alto saxophone (3), clarinet (3), bass clarinet (3), flute (3), baritone saxophone (8)

Production

- Chris Athens – mastering
- Ryan Tuttle – engineering
- Derek Bergheimer – vocal engineering (8)
- Mikaelin "Blue" Bluespruce – engineering (8)
- Tyondai Braxton – additional production (1–3, 7, 8)
- Sonny DiPerri – drum and percussion engineering (1–7), mixing (8), additional engineering (9)
- Jimmy Douglass – mixing (1–7), additional vocal engineering (4)
- David Tolomei – additional mixing (1, 2, 7, 8)
- Jamie Walters – string quartet engineering (4, 5, 7)

== Charts ==
Chart (2017)	Peak position
Belgian Albums (Ultratop Flanders)	84
Dutch Albums (Album Top 100)	122
UK Independent Albums (Official Charts)	24
US Independent Albums (Billboard)	18
