= The Glad Fact =

Studio album by Dirty Projectors
- Released: November 4, 2003
- Recorded: January – August 2002
- Genre: Art rock; indie rock
- Length: 44:45 (CD); 48:04 (LP)
- Label: Western Vinyl
- Producer: David Longstreth

Dirty Projectors chronology
The Glad Fact (2003)	Morning Better Last! (2003)

Professional ratings
Review scores
Source	Rating
AllMusic	4/5 stars
Pitchfork	8.5/10

The Glad Fact is the debut studio album by experimental rock band Dirty Projectors. Like other Dirty Projectors albums, The Glad Fact contain recurring symbols of finches and cars. Most songs are closer to the style of The Graceful Fallen Mango than the heavier bass and glitch-style songs of The Getty Address or simple ballads on Slaves' Graves and Ballads. Western Vinyl issued the album as both a digipak CD and a 12" vinyl; the vinyl included an unlisted bonus track between "Ground Underfoot" and "Spirit-Future Medley". Both versions feature the image of a naked man sitting down, although the CD has the band's name on the front whereas the vinyl has it on the back.

== Track listing ==
All tracks are written by David Longstreth.

No.	Title	Length
1.	"The Glad Fact"	5:15
2.	"My Offwhite Flag"	3:02
3.	"Like Fake Blood in Crisp October"	2:36
4.	"Boredom Is a Product"	2:15
5.	"Two Brown Finches"	2:06
6.	"Three Brown Finches"	2:59
7.	"Off Science Hill"	5:03
8.	"Winter Is Here"	2:44
9.	"Ground Underfoot"	3:24
10.	"Spirit-Future Medley"	2:02
11.	"Naked We Made It"	3:14
12.	"Lit From Below"	2:29
13.	"Imaginary Love"	2:46
14.	"The Highway Is A Foggy Knife"	2:09
15.	"The Minutes"	2:41
