= Amber Coffman =

American singer-songwriter

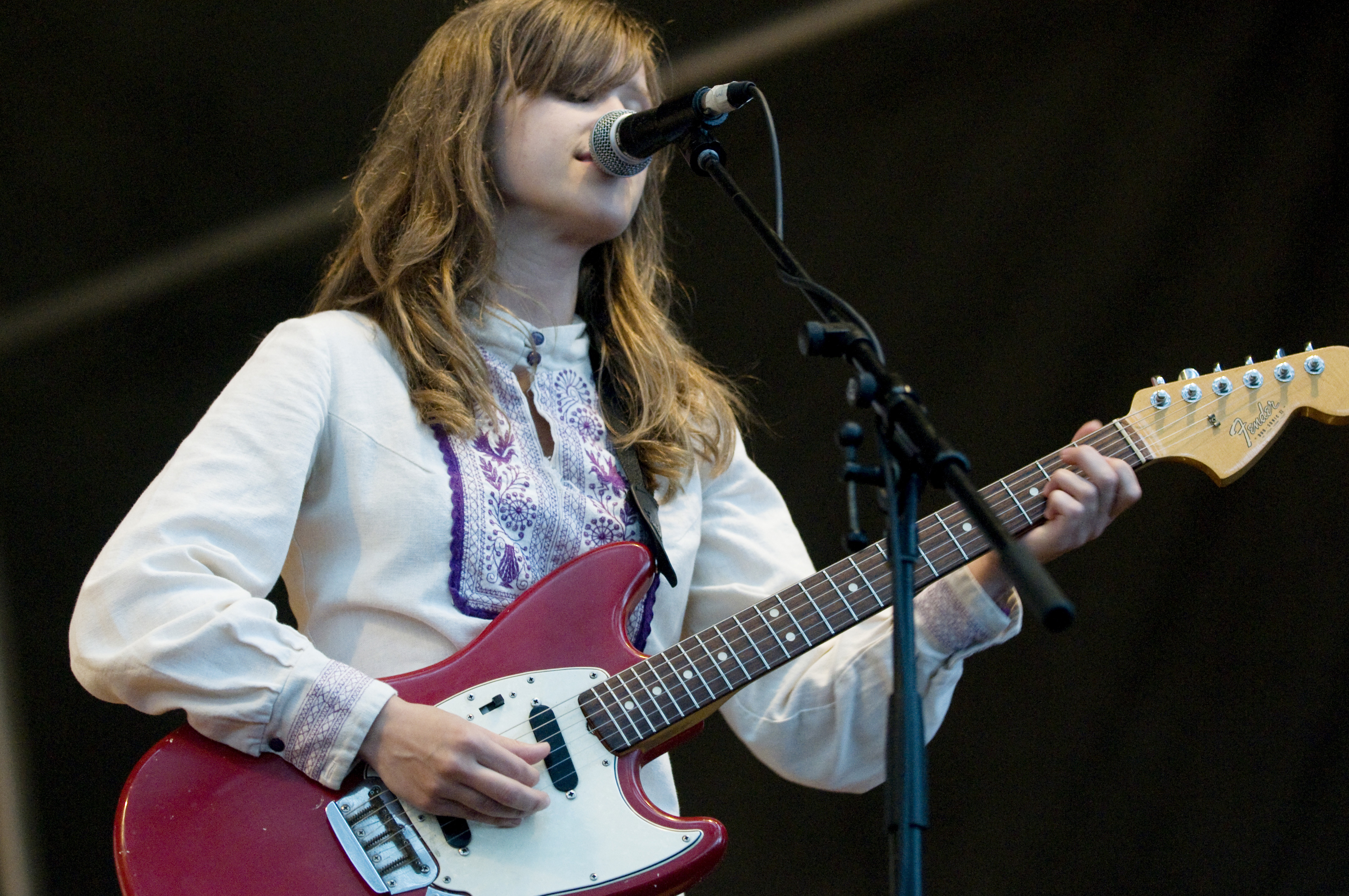
- Coffman in 2008

Background information
- Born: Amber Dawn Coffman; June 15, 1984 (age 42); Austin, Texas, U.S.
- Genres: Indie rock, art pop, R&B, experimental
- Occupation: Singer-songwriter
- Instruments: Vocals, guitar
- Years active: 2005–present
- Label: Columbia Records
- Formerly of: Dirty Projectors, Sleeping People

Amber Dawn Coffman (born June 15, 1984) is an American singer-songwriter based in Los Angeles, California, formerly based in Brooklyn, New York. She was formerly a guitarist for Sleeping People, and was later a guitarist and vocalist for the indie rock band Dirty Projectors. She released her debut studio album as a solo artist, City of No Reply in June 2017.

== Early life ==
Coffman grew up in Ohio, Texas, Arizona and California, attending at least 11 different schools. She had an early love of the women in R&B in the 1990s, and became interested in rock as a teenager.

== Music career ==
As a teenager living in San Diego, Coffman worked at a grocery store as a day job and was a guitarist in an instrumental math rock band called Sleeping People.

=== Dirty Projectors ===
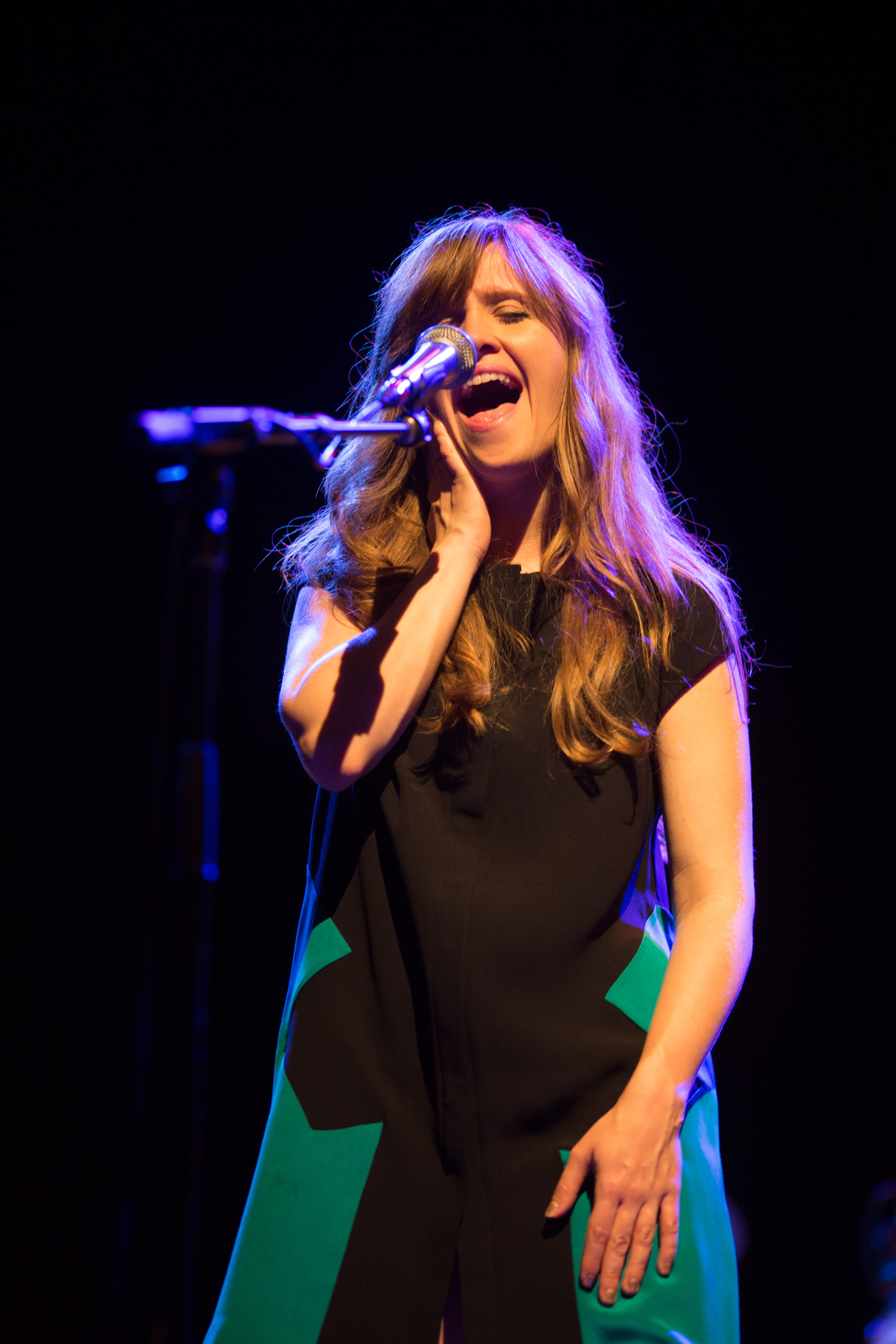
Coffman performing with Dirty Projectors. Sydney Opera House, 2013

Coffman moved to New York at 22 and joined Dirty Projectors on guitar and vocals, beginning with the band's 2006 tour for Rise Above. She continued with the band through Bitte Orca (2009), the Björk collaboration Mount Wittenberg Orca (2010, inspired by Coffman sighting a family of Orcas off the coast of California), Swing Lo Magellan (2012) and the EP About to Die (2012).

Dee Lockett, in New York Magazine, said Coffman's "soft, silky voice stood out on the band’s biggest songs, like 'Stillness Is the Move'" from Bitte Orca. Describing Coffman's influence on the band's sound, Erik Adams wrote in the A.V. Club:

Amber Coffman made the avant-garde almost mistakable for Top 40. Coffman’s melismatic lead on "Stillness Is The Move" was a breakout moment for the Brooklyn band, and in harmony with Angel Deradoorian and Haley Dekle, she formed a vocal powerhouse that could either provide a radio-friendly counterpoint to David Longstreth's Arthur Russell-esque bleats or urge songs like "Useful Chamber" and "Gun Has No Trigger" deeper into alien territory.

=== Solo work ===
While in the band, Coffman also continued to create her own demos. She began writing an album in 2011 and released City of No Reply, her first solo album, on June 2, 2017.

=== Other collaborations ===
Coffman has also collaborated with electronic artist Rusko on the 2010 track "Hold On" and with Diplo of Major Lazer on the 2012 track "Get Free". In 2013, she was featured on hip hop artist J. Cole's song "She Knows" from his album Born Sinner. In 2012, she collaborated on "No Regrets" with Snoop Lion and T.I. She also collaborated with rapper Riff Raff on a song called "Cool It Down" on his Neon Icon album. She sang on Frank Ocean's song "Nikes", the lead single from his album Blonde.

== Discography ==
=== Sleeping People ===
- Growing (2007)

=== Dirty Projectors ===
- Rise Above (2007)
- Bitte Orca (2009)
- Mount Wittenberg Orca featuring Björk (2010)
- Swing Lo Magellan (2012)
- About to Die EP (2012)

=== Solo ===
==== Album ====
- City of No Reply (2017)

==== Singles ====
- "All to Myself" (2016)
- "No Coffee" (2017)
- "Nobody Knows" (2017)

=== As featured artist ===
Title	Year	Peak chart positions						Certifications	Album
Title	Year	BEL (Vl)	BEL (Wa)	DEN	FRA	NL	UK	Certifications	Album
"Hold On" (Rusko featuring Amber Coffman)	2010	71	88	—	—	—	96		O.M.G.!
"Get Free" (Major Lazer featuring Amber Coffman)	2012	3	17	29	59	7	56	BPI: Silver	Free the Universe
"No Regrets" (Snoop Lion featuring T.I. & Amber Coffman)	2012	—	—	—	—	—	—		Reincarnated
"She Knows" (J. Cole featuring Amber Coffman & Cults)	2013	—	—	—	—	—	68	BPI: Platinum	Born Sinner
"—" denotes items which were not released in that country or failed to chart.
