= Rise Above (Dirty Projectors album) =

Studio album by Dirty Projectors
- Released: September 11, 2007
- Recorded: 2007
- Genre: Indie rock; art rock
- Length: 45:41
- Label: Dead Oceans
- Producer: David Longstreth, Chris Taylor

Dirty Projectors chronology
New Attitude (2006)	Rise Above (2007)	Bitte Orca (2009)

Rise Above is the fifth studio album by indie rock band Dirty Projectors, released on September 11, 2007. The album was band leader David Longstreth's reinterpretation of Black Flag album Damaged from memory having not heard it in 15 years. The album features Longstreth on guitar and vocals, Amber Coffman on vocals and guitar, Brian McOmber on drums, Nat Baldwin on bass, and Susanna Waiche on vocals. Angel Deradoorian would join the band shortly before the Rise Above tour on bass and vocals. This album is the first that presents Dirty Projectors as a fully realized band rather than an individual project of Longstreth.

== Reception ==
Professional ratings
Review scores
Source	Rating
AllMusic	4/5 stars
The A.V. Club	B+
Dusted Magazine	(Favorable)
Pitchfork	(8.1/10)
PopMatters	(8/10)
Rockfeedback	5/5 stars
Sputnikmusic	3.5/5 stars

The record was generally well received by critics, maintaining a 78% positive rating at Metacritic. The album received particularly high ratings from The A.V. Club and Pitchfork. AllMusic called the album "a brave and ultimately successful experiment."

== Track listing ==
1. "What I See" - 3:27
2. "No More" - 3:48
3. "Depression" - 2:48
4. "Six Pack" - 3:05
5. "Thirsty and Miserable" - 5:55
6. "Police Story" - 4:23
7. "Gimmie Gimmie Gimmie" - 4:50
8. "Spray Paint (The Walls)" - 3:38
9. "Room 13" - 4:47
10. "Rise Above" - 5:03
11. Untitled (bonus track) - 1:14

=== Vinyl edition ===
Side one

1. "What I See" - 3:27
2. "No More" - 3:48
3. "Depression" - 2:48
4. "Six Pack" - 3:05
5. "Thirsty and Miserable" - 5:55
6. Untitled (bonus track) - 1:14

Side two

1. "Police Story" - 4:23
2. "Gimmie Gimmie Gimmie" - 4:50
3. "Spray Paint (The Walls)" - 3:38
4. "Room 13" - 4:47
5. "Rise Above" - 5:03
