= Mount Wittenberg Orca =

EP by Björk and Dirty Projectors
- Released: 30 June 2010
- Recorded: 28 April–1 May 2010
- Studios: Rare Book Room, Brooklyn, New York City
- Genres: Pop; experimental
- Length: 21:19
- Label: self-released
- Producer: David Longstreth

Dirty Projectors chronology
Bitte Orca (2009)	Mount Wittenberg Orca (2010)	Swing Lo Magellan (2012)

Björk chronology
Voltaïc (2009)	Mount Wittenberg Orca (2010)	Biophilia (2011)

Mount Wittenberg Orca is an EP by American indie rock band Dirty Projectors and Icelandic singer and songwriter Björk, released on June 30, 2010, in digital-only format, CD and vinyl by Domino Records on 24 October 2011. News of the album was announced on Björk's official website on 26 June 2010, four days before its release.

The vocals are dominant on all the tracks, which form an experimental and pop continuum.

== Background and composition ==
The genesis of what would become Mount Wittenberg Orca began in 2008, when Stereogum created a tribute album for Björk's 1995 studio album, Post, entitled Enjoyed: A Tribute to Björk's Post New York indie band Dirty Projectors covered the song "Hyperballad" and wrote of their love of the Icelandic singer: "She writes these classic melodies but breaks them apart so that it’s sort of up to you as the listener to put them back together. The song ends up meaning so much more because of the effort you have to give to it."

On March 26, 2009, Brandon Stosuy of Stereogum announced that Björk and Dirty Projectors were joining forces for a one-time benefit show at Housing Works Bookstore & Café in Manhattan. All proceeds went to Housing Works, a non-profit fighting AIDS and homelessness, and was presented as part of their "Live from Home" series of concerts. Stosuy himself approached the artists about appearing at Housing Works but was unprepared for their approach to the concert. Instead of performing music from their back catalogs, Dirty Projector's David Longstreth had composed a brand new suite written for five voices (Björk and Longstreth on lead vocals, and Dirty Projectors' female trio Amber Coffman, Angel Deradoorian, and Haley Dekle). Two opening acts were chosen: Kurt Weisman by Longstreth and fellow Icelandic artist Ólöf Arnalds by Björk.

The benefit concert was held on 8 May 2009 with M.I.A., St. Vincent, David Byrne and Haley Joel Osment, amongst 250 others, in attendance. The night began with acoustic renditions of songs from Dirty Projectors' previous album, Bitte Orca before lead singer Longstreth introduced the material he composed especially for the evening, announcing, “We’ve never played it in front of anyone before, and we are just incredibly honored to sing this music with Björk." The six song cycle recounts the moment band member Amber Coffman made eye contact with a whale on the northern California coast, near Mount Wittenberg. In their review on the concert, Stereogum said "Björk’s seismic vocal proved a perfect counterpart to Dirty Projectors’ staggered, staggering needlepoint vocal harmonies, and a perfect mouthpiece for Longstreth's melodies." In an interview published on the site, Longstreth mentioned he wrote "the Housing Works songs... in about a week" and said it was a "sister" project to Bitte Orca.

In April 2010, nearly a year after the concert was held, both acts recorded an updated version of Mount Wittenberg Orca at Brooklyn's Rare Book Room studio. The money raised from the self released digital EP was donated to the National Geographic Society Oceans Initiatives, which helps create international marine protected areas. The album was released on 30 June 2010. Lyrics and even song titles changed from the original concert to the recorded album. The song "Ever Onward" was released as "On and Ever Onward", "Until the Day I Die" was released as "When the World Comes to an End" and "Singing Through a Tinted Window" became "Sharing Orb".

Over a year later on October 24, 2011, Mount Wittenberg Orca was released on CD and vinyl by Domino.

On April 22, 2023 as part of Record Store Day, an exclusive expanded double LP edition of the EP was released. The new expanded edition added 13 bonus tracks of never before released material. This included the live Housing Works performance from 2009, early demos of Mount Wittenberg Orca and archival audio of the band and Björk rehearsing the material.

== Critical reception ==
Professional ratings
Aggregate scores
Source	Rating
Metacritic	79/100
Review scores
Source	Rating
AllMusic	4/5 stars
Consequence of Sound	B
Drowned in Sound	8/10
Pitchfork	7.7/10
PopMatters	7/10 stars
Tiny Mix Tapes	4.5/5 stars

Mount Wittenberg Orca received positive reviews from music critics. At Metacritic, which assigns a normalised rating out of 100 to reviews from mainstream critics, the album received an average score of 79, based on 15 reviews, which indicates "generally favorable reviews". AllMusic called the pairing of Dirty Projectors and Björk "inspired" and a "brief but powerful statement" that "brought out the best" of both artists. Tiny Mix Tapes praised the minimalist direction of the EP and highlighted the vocal talents of Dirty Projectors' Amber Coffman in addition to the acute environmental awareness of the lyrics. Drowned in Sound heavily praised the work of David Longstreth and Dirty Projectors in general, saying the EP sounded better than their previous long play, Bitte Orca. They also praised the Longstreth's use of Björk, labeling her vocal contributions "immediately arresting" while noting that the "strength of the songwriting... wouldn’t suffer were she not a feature." PopMatters said that Björk "fit in perfectly" with Dirty Projectors and ultimately noted that while the EP is "an acquired taste... no one else makes music like this." Writing for the Independent on the occasion of the EP's physical release in 2011, Andy Gill compared Mount Wittenberg Orca favorably against Björk's newest album at the time, Biophilia, describing it as "a welcome compensation for those who, like me, found... Biophilia a touch too amorphous to enjoy."

== Album art ==
The mountain photographed for the album cover is actually not Mount Wittenberg but nearby Black Mountain in Marin county.

== Track listing ==
Mount Wittenberg Orca
No.	Title	Length
1.	"Ocean"	2:09
2.	"On and Ever Onward"	2:01
3.	"When the World Comes to an End"	3:08
4.	"Beautiful Mother"	2:16
5.	"Sharing Orb"	2:48
6.	"No Embrace"	4:14
7.	"All We Are"	4:44
Total length:		21:19

Mount Wittenberg Orca – Expanded edition
No.	Title	Length
8.	"Intro" (Live from Housing Works 2009)	2:16
9.	"Ocean" (Live from Housing Works 2009)	1:14
10.	"On and Ever Onward" (Live from Housing Works 2009)	2:21
11.	"When The World Comes To An End" (Live from Housing Works 2009)	2:27
12.	"Beautiful Mother" (Live from Housing Works 2009)	1:59
13.	"Sharing Orb" (Live from Housing Works 2009)	2:25
14.	"No Embrace" (Live from Housing Works 2009)	3:02
15.	"All We Are" (Live from Housing Works 2009)	3:39
16.	"Wave Invocation" (MWO I Inverness Demo)	1:16
17.	"Motherwhale Song" (MWO II Inverness Demo)	2:11
18.	"Whale Watcher Song" (MWO III Inverness Demo)	1:54
19.	"19 Fugal Swim" (MWO IV Inverness Demo)	2:02
20.	"First Duet" (MWO V Inverness Demo)	2:13
21.	"Migration" (Unfinished MWO VI Inverness Demo)	1:13
22.	"Jubilation" (MWO VII Inverness Demo)	2:18
23.	"Benediction" (MWO VIII Inverness Demo)	2:32
24.	"When the World Comes To An End" (Freewrite Demo)	0:32
25.	"When the World Comes To An End" (Vocalise Rehearsal Rough)	2:46
26.	"Beautiful Mother" (Vocalise Rehearsal Rough)	1:03
27.	"On and Ever Onward" (Full Rehearsal Rough)	2:37
Total length:		63:35

== Personnel ==
The following people contributed to Mount Wittenberg Orca:

- Written by: David Longstreth
- Performed by: Nathaniel Baldwin, Björk, Amber Coffman, Haley Dekle, Angel Deradoorian, David Longstreth and Brian McOmber
- Recorded at the Rare Book Room, 4/28 – 5/1/2010 by Nicolas Vernhes
- Assisted by Tom Gloady
- Produced by David Longstreth
- Mixed by Nicolas Vernhes with David Longstreth and Björk
- Mastered by Joe Lambert
- Mount Wittenberg trailers directed by Matthew Lessner, montelomax.com
