= Earth Crisis (disambiguation) =

Earth Crisis is an American hardcore punk band.

Earth Crisis may also refer to:

- Earth Crisis (album), a 1984 album by British roots reggae band Steel Pulse
- Earth Crisis (EP), a 2020 album by American indie rock band Dirty Projectors
