= Swing Lo Magellan =

Studio album by Dirty Projectors
- Released: July 10, 2012
- Recorded: 2011
- Genres: Indie rock; art pop; experimental
- Length: 42:06
- Label: Domino
- Producer: Dave Longstreth

Dirty Projectors chronology
Mount Wittenberg Orca (2010)	Swing Lo Magellan (2012)	About to Die EP (2012)

Singles from Swing Lo Magellan
- 1. "Gun Has No Trigger" Released: July 10, 2012; 2. "About to Die" Released: November 6, 2012; 3. "Offspring Are Blank" Released: February 25, 2013; 4. "The Socialites" Released: May 13, 2013

Swing Lo Magellan is the sixth studio album by American experimental rock group Dirty Projectors, which was released on Domino Records on July 10, 2012, in the United States and July 9, 2012, internationally.

== Background and recording ==
Swing Lo Magellan was written, recorded, produced and mixed by Dave Longstreth in Delaware County, New York. The recording sessions for the album spanned a year and resulted in around 40 overall demos. The album was recorded without the input of Angel Deradoorian, who left the band during its production.

Longstreth wanted Swing Lo Magellan to be a collection of individual songs instead of an album united by a single theme, unlike with previous albums. In addition, he sought to write songs in a more personal manner than most preceding Dirty Projectors material.

The album cover features Dave Longstreth and Amber Coffman talking to one of their neighbors in Upstate New York, where Swing Lo Magellan was recorded; the photo was taken by Longstreth's brother Jake Longstreth.

== Music ==
Swing Lo Magellan has been described as more "beats-driven" and more accessible than previous Dirty Projectors albums. For specific influences on the album's direction, critics and Longstreth himself have cited a variety of influences, ranging from popular music acts such as Nirvana, Lil Wayne, Michael Jackson, Neil Young, En Vogue, and Blind Willie Johnson, to classical music composers such as Arnold Schoenberg and György Ligeti. Wyndham Wyeth of Paste Magazine assessed that "rather than trying to make every track work under an overarching theme, the songs on Magellan were crafted individually and with care. Each tune is perfectly capable of standing on its own, and there is a lot of diversity in the music, but the record still manages to feel whole as a work of art in itself".

The song "Impregnable Question" was later sampled by the band themselves for the song "Keep Your Name" from their 2017 self-titled album, Dirty Projectors.

== Release ==
Swing Lo Magellan's first single, "Gun Has No Trigger", was released on March 30, 2012 and was selected as a Best New Track by Pitchfork Media on April 2. On June 8, 2012, a music video for "Gun Has No Trigger" was released. The video was visually influenced by many of Apple's commercials for the iPod, as well as the default profile images used on Facebook and Gmail. On June 14, 2012, a second song from the album, "Dance for You", was released online. Swing Lo Magellan was streamed in its entirety on July 2, 2012.

A film featuring music from Swing Lo Magellan, titled Hi Custodian, was released on September 7, 2012. The film, which features the band's members portraying a variety of characters in a surreal narrative about spiritual death and rebirth, was directed by Longstreth and was influenced by Kanye West's Runaway, as well as the film Purple Rain.

The album peaked at #22 on the Billboard 200 and #2 on the Independent Albums chart.

== Reception ==
Professional ratings
Aggregate scores
Source	Rating
AnyDecentMusic?	8.0/10
Metacritic	80/100
Review scores
Source	Rating
AllMusic	3.5/5 stars
The A.V. Club	A−
Entertainment Weekly	B
The Guardian	4/5 stars
The Independent	4/5 stars
Los Angeles Times	3.5/4 stars
NME	7/10
Pitchfork	8.8/10
Rolling Stone	3.5/5 stars
Spin	9/10

Swing Lo Magellan received general acclaim from music critics. At Metacritic, which assigns a normalized rating out of 100 to reviews from mainstream critics, the album received an average score of 80, based on 41 reviews, indicating "generally favorable reviews".

Spin's Dan Weiss called Swing Lo Magellan "The Dirty Projectors' best album by a mile", describing the album as "[...] all magnificent wobble, no collapse". Weiss also praised the female vocals, writing "[...] the female singers [...] buttress Longstreth, rather than rescuing him from the car wreck of his own voice". Chris Mincher of The A.V. Club gave the album a grade of A−, writing that "where Longstreth’s quirks have often felt carefully calculated, here they come off as spontaneous improvisations or even mistakes. This relaxed, informal execution makes Swing Lo Magellan seem vulnerable, imperfect, and earnestly human. By easing off on all the wizardry—as impressive as it is—Longstreth creates room to actually feel something". Pitchfork's Grayson Currin gave the album a "Best New Music" designation, writing "the band's least ornate batch of songs to date builds upon Longstreth's most direct and identifiable lyrics ever. Which means that Dirty Projectors have upped their emotional and structural accessibility all at once". Alex Niven of The Quietus described the album as "strikingly warm, organic, and intricately drawn" and noted the "basic primal glee in encountering Longstreth's psychedelic neologisms as they crop up". Thomas May of musicOMH also praised the album, writing "Swing Lo Magellan affords generous breathing space to Dirty Projectors' music: a context in which new levels of unpretentious eloquence positively flourish".

Not all critics were entirely positive towards the album. Entertainment Weekly's Darren Franich wrote "[Swing Lo Magellan] should be thrillingly anarchic; instead, it just meanders". Aneet Nijjar of AllMusic acknowledged that some listeners might find the band's "rather knowing idiosyncrasy" to be "off-putting and smug". Blurt wrote that while Swing Lo Magellan was "instantly likeable", the album "unravels into nonsense and complexity on second glance". Alex Wilson of Tiny Mix Tapes did not find the album engaging and criticized the music's inability to match the ideas behind the album. Wilson concluded: "Simply put, the music on Swing Lo can’t support its great ideas. [...] Maybe time will prove me completely and utterly wrong, but as far as I can tell, nothing on Swing Lo walks by itself".

Wyndham Wyeth of Paste Magazine said of the album and its lyricism: "It’s not pretty, but it’s direct and honest and unafraid to stand naked for the world to see its scars".

=== Accolades ===
On December 5, 2012, Swing Lo Magellan was nominated for Best Recording Package at the 55th Grammy Awards. On December 20, 2012, Pitchfork ranked the album #15 on its list of the top 50 albums of 2012, with Mike Powell writing that "for some bands, maturity means getting softer. For bands as talented and skeptical of routine as this one, it means getting better". The album also placed #50 on Rolling Stone's list of the top 50 albums of 2012. The album was listed 10th on Stereogum's list of the top 50 albums of 2012.

== Track listing ==
All tracks are written by David Longstreth, except where noted.

No.	Title	Writer(s)	Length
1.	"Offspring Are Blank"		4:00
2.	"About to Die"		3:59
3.	"Gun Has No Trigger"		3:24
4.	"Swing Lo Magellan"		2:37
5.	"Just from Chevron"		4:07
6.	"Dance for You"		3:23
7.	"Maybe That Was It"		3:56
8.	"Impregnable Question"		2:43
9.	"See What She Seeing"		3:39
10.	"The Socialites"	Longstreth; Amber Coffman	3:48
11.	"Unto Caesar"		3:37
12.	"Irresponsible Tune"		2:47
Total length:			42:06

- Some units from the first pressing of the album sold at some independent music stores in the UK included a bonus 7" vinyl single containing two tracks not included on the album: "Buckle Up" on side A and "Desire to Love" on side B. The record was also available for free at all of the band's US shows on its summer tour, and the two songs featured on it were also later issued as bonus tracks on some versions of the band's About to Die EP.

== Personnel ==
Credits are adapted from the album's liner notes.

Dirty Projectors

- David Longstreth – producer, arrangement, mixing, performer, art direction, design
- Amber Coffman – performer
- Nat Baldwin – performer
- Brian McOmber – performer
- Haley Dekle – performer

Additional musicians

- yMusic:
  - Rob Moose – violin (2, 6, 9, 11)
  - Nadia Sirota – viola (2, 6, 9, 11)
  - Clarice Jensen – cello (2, 6, 9, 11)
  - Alex Sopp – flutes (2, 6, 9, 11)
  - Hideaki Aomori – clarinets (2, 6, 9, 11), saxophone (2, 6, 9, 11)
  - CJ Camerieri – trumpet, horn (2, 6, 9, 11)

Production

- Donato Paternostro – engineering, additional mixing (6, 7, 8, 10)
- Carl Barc – additional mixing (6, 7, 8, 10)
- Bob Ludwig – mastering

Artwork

- Jake Longstreth – cover photo
- Rob Carmichael – design
- SEEN – design

== Charts ==
Chart (2012)	Peak position
US Billboard 200	22
US Independent Albums (Billboard)	2
US Alternative Albums (Billboard)	4
US Rock Albums (Billboard)	4
