= New Attitude =

New Attitude may refer to the following:

- New Attitude (TV series), a short lived American TV sitcom
- New Attitude (album), the second studio album by Australian band Young Divas
- "New Attitude" (song), a 1985 pop song by Patti LaBelle
- New Attitude EP, a 2006 EP by American indie rock band Dirty Projectors
