= City of No Reply =

Studio album by Amber Coffman
- Released: June 2, 2017
- Recorded: 2015
- Studios: Ivo Shandor (Los Angeles, California)
- Genres: R&B, indie pop
- Length: 45:55
- Label: Columbia
- Producer: David Longstreth

Singles from City of No Reply
- 1. "All to Myself" Released: October 16, 2016; 2. "No Coffee" Released: March 31, 2017; 3. "Nobody Knows" Released: May 19, 2017

City of No Reply is the first solo album from singer-songwriter Amber Coffman, the former guitarist and vocalist for the indie rock band Dirty Projectors. The album was released on June 2, 2017.

== Recording ==
Coffman began writing the album in 2011. After moving to Los Angeles in 2013 and working with other producers, she ultimately recorded City of No Reply in 2015 at the Los Angeles studio of her Dirty Projectors bandmate David Longstreth. Longstreth and Coffman had previously dated, ending their six-year romantic relationship in 2012, but Coffman selected Longstreth to produce her album after they resumed a platonic friendship and began working on music together again in 2014.

== Musical style and subject matter ==
In The Guardian, Tim Jonze described the album as "sunny, R&B-influenced album abundant with fluttering melodies," saying "the influence of Coffman’s former band is detectable, adding offbeat appeal to balance out her more accessible tendencies. The result is intriguing – an album about going it alone, that hasn’t entirely shaken its past." At The A.V. Club, Erik Adams also notes echoes of Dirty Projectors style, but says, "More frequently, the compositions give off a sense of untethered exploration." At NPR, Stephen Thompson described the album as "a love letter to the act of going solo, in life as in music," the songs "road maps to finding contentment and adventure as fearlessly as possible, even if it means coming to terms with solitude."

Writing about single "No Coffee", Robin Hilton of NPR described the song "a relatively buoyant pop rumination on anxieties over lost love."

== Release ==
Coffman released the album on June 2, 2017, though noted the release date had been delayed from 2016. Prior to the album's release, she released three singles: "All to Myself", released with a music video on October 16, 2016; "No Coffee" on March 31, 2017 and a music video directed by Zia Anger on May 1, 2017; and "Nobody Knows" on May 19, 2017.

== Reception ==
At Metacritic, which assigns a normalised rating out of 100 to reviews from mainstream critics, the album has an average score of 78 out of 100, which indicates "generally favorable reviews" based on eight reviews. In The Guardian, Jonze gave the album four of five stars. New York Magazine named single "All to Myself" one of the "Best New Songs of the Week" and at Pitchfork, Marc Hogan reviewed the track as "a sumptuously melodic singalong for solitary souls everywhere...On a chorus as warm and life-affirming as an afternoon in the sun, Coffman sings of an inner voice, and demonstrates how to release it." In Spin, Anna Gaca said, "The first two songs ("All to Myself" and "No Coffee") are so pleasant and fun they feel like little miracles," though found songs on the album's B-side "less instantly memorable...The brighter moments of the second half can be interesting, but never as achingly perfect as that opening stretch." In Stereogum, James Rettig described "Nobody Knows" as "a starry and shuffling number that shows off Coffman’s impeccably controlled range and ends in a surprisingly clanky breakdown."

== Track listing ==
All tracks are written by Amber Coffman and David Longstreth except where noted.

| No. | Title | Length |
|---|---|---|
| 1. | "All to Myself" | 5:39 |
| 2. | "No Coffee" (Amber Coffman, Nicholas Krgovich, David Longstreth) | 4:06 |
| 3. | "Dark Night" | 3:43 |
| 4. | "City of No Reply" | 3:51 |
| 5. | "Miss You" (Amber Coffman, Nicholas Krgovich, David Longstreth) | 4:39 |
| 6. | "Do You Believe" (Amber Coffman, Nicholas Krgovich, David Longstreth) | 3:43 |
| 7. | "If You Want My Heart" | 3:41 |
| 8. | "Nobody Knows" | 3:47 |
| 9. | "Under the Sun" | 3:23 |
| 10. | "Brand New" (Amber Coffman, Nicholas Krgovich, David Longstreth) | 5:03 |
| 11. | "Kindness" | 4:15 |
| Total length: | | 45:55 |
