= Sleeping People =

American rock band

- Origin: San Diego, California
- Genres: Instrumental rock Progressive rock Post-rock
- Years active: 2002–present
- Label: Temporary Residence Limited
- Members: Kasey Boekholt (guitar); Joileah Concepcion (guitar); Brandon Relf (drums); Kenseth Thibideau (bass)
- Past members: Amber Coffman (guitar)
- Website: www.sleepingpeople.com

Sleeping People is an instrumental rock band from San Diego, California that formed in early 2002. They first started playing live at the end of that year as a trio consisting of Joileah Concepcion (guitar), Kasey Boekholt (guitar) and Brandon Relf (drums), with bassist Kenseth Thibideau joining the group in 2003. In 2005, the band released their self-titled debut album through Temporary Residence records. Around that same time, guitarist Concepcion left the band due to relocation, and her friend Amber Coffman replaced her on guitar. With Coffman, the band wrote and recorded three tracks that appeared on their second album, Growing. In early 2007, Concepcion returned to her former position while Coffman departed to join the Dirty Projectors, and the original lineup resumed. The style of instrumental rock they play is sometimes referred to as math rock, which is characterized by complex, atypical rhythmic structures, stop/start dynamics and angular, dissonant riffs.

== Members ==
- Kasey Boekholt – guitar
- Joileah Concepcion – guitar
- Brandon Relf – drums
- Kenseth Thibideau – bass

=== Past members ===
- Amber Coffman – guitar (2005–2007)

== Discography ==
- Sleeping People (2005)
- Growing (2007)
- NOTRUF (2012)
