= 5EPs =

2020 anthology album by Dirty Projectors

- CD and digital cover

Compilation album by Dirty Projectors
- Released: November 20, 2020
- Length: 55:02
- Label: Domino
- Producer: David Longstreth

Dirty Projectors chronology
Lamp Lit Prose (2018)	5EPs (2020)

Singles from 5EPs
- 1. "Overlord" Released: February 26, 2020; 2. "Search for Life" Released: March 24, 2020; 3. "Lose Your Love" Released: May 5, 2020; 4. "Inner World" Released: June 11, 2020; 5. "Holy Mackerel" Released: August 19, 2020; 6. "Searching Spirit" Released: October 27, 2020

5EPs is an anthology of five extended play albums released by American indie rock band Dirty Projectors throughout 2020. The first four EPs each feature a different band member as lead vocalist: Windows Open (Maia Friedman), Flight Tower (Felicia Douglass), Super João (Dave Longstreth), Earth Crisis (Kristin Slipp). The full band sings on the final EP, Ring Road.

== Promotion and release ==
Dirty Projectors released a video for "Overlord" in February 2020, their first new music since 2018, when the band's lineup changed. "Overlord" would later appear on Windows Open, the band's first EP in the five-EP series, released on March 27, 2020. "Search for Life", another track on the EP, was released a few days prior to the album.

The band performed "Lose Your Love" (from Flight Tower) on the late-night comedy show Full Frontal with Samantha Bee in mid-2020.

For the fifth EP, Ring Road, the band released a video for "My Possession".

Domino released the five EPs as the anthology 5EPs on November 20, 2020, as both a double vinyl LP record and a five-disc deluxe box set.

EP	Release date	Lead vocalist
Windows Open	March 27, 2020	Maia Friedman
Flight Tower	June 25, 2020	Felicia Douglass
Super João	September 4, 2020	David Longstreth
Earth Crisis	October 1, 2020	Kristin Slipp
Ring Road	November 20, 2020	—N/a

== Reception ==
Professional ratings
Aggregate scores
Source	Rating
Metacritic	75/100
Review scores
Source	Rating
AllMusic	4/5 stars
Exclaim!	8/10
The Line of Best Fit	9/10
Paste	6.8/10
Slant Magazine	3.5/5 stars

At Metacritic, which assigns a normalized rating out of 100 to reviews from professional publications, the album received an average score of 75, based on 7 reviews.

Mark Deming of AllMusic wrote, "Some listeners may prefer to only focus on one or two chapters in this series, but 5EPS confirms that all of them make the grade, individually and collectively." Kaelen Bell of Exclaim wrote, "In allowing others back into the fray and stripping their sound, Longstreth has once again tapped into what made the band so engrossing in the first place. 5EPs feels like a restart, a long and considered exhale." Max Freedman of Paste wrote, "5EPs is the first time this seemingly interminable project has felt completely approachable, rather than yet another informational overload in this swirling year. And though it highlights each performer’s unique strengths, it sometimes obscures the new members’ talents under tried-and-true Dirty Projectors sounds."

== Track listing ==
Windows Open
No.	Title	Writer(s)	Length
1.	"On the Breeze"	David Longstreth; Maia Friedman; Nathaniel Baldwin	2:08
2.	"Overlord"	Longstreth; Friedman; Michael Johnson; Baldwin	2:43
3.	"Search for Life"	Longstreth; Friedman; Oliver Hill	2:49
4.	"Guarding the Baby"	Longstreth; Friedman	2:40

Flight Tower
No.	Title	Writer(s)	Length
5.	"Inner World"	Longstreth; Felicia Douglass	2:22
6.	"Lose Your Love"	Longstreth; Douglass	2:48
7.	"Self Design"	Longstreth	3:06
8.	"Empty Vessel"	Longstreth	2:19

Super João
No.	Title	Writer(s)	Length
9.	"Holy Mackerel"	Longstreth	4:01
10.	"I Get Carried Away"	Longstreth	2:11
11.	"You Create Yourself"	Longstreth	2:48
12.	"Moon, If Ever"	Longstreth; Kyle Field	2:19

Earth Crisis
No.	Title	Writer(s)	Length
13.	"Eyes on the Road"	Longstreth; Kristin Slipp	2:48
14.	"There I Said It"	Longstreth; Slipp	1:21
15.	"Bird's Eye"	Longstreth; Slipp	4:40
16.	"Now I Know"	Longstreth; Slipp	4:03

Ring Road
No.	Title	Writer(s)	Length
17.	"Por Qué No"	Longstreth; Johnson	1:43
18.	"Searching Spirit"	Longstreth	2:34
19.	"No Studying"	Longstreth; Johnson	2:28
20.	"My Possession"	Longstreth	3:11
