= Jordan Dykstra =

Jordan Isaiah Whitney Dykstra
- Origin: Sioux City, Iowa
- Genres: experimental, microtonal, ambient, drone, film music
- Occupations: composer, performer, film composer
- Instrument: viola
- Labels: Important Records, elsewhere, New World Records, Milan Records, Marriage Records, Editions Verde, Shatter Your Leaves, Modern Documents
- Website: jordandykstra.com

Jordan Dykstra is an American film music and chamber music composer and violist from Sioux City, Iowa.

Academically, Dykstra studied composition at CalArts with Michael Pisaro, Wolfgang von Schweinitz, and Ulrich Krieger; privately with Daníel Bjarnason, Chiyoko Szlavnics, and at Wesleyan University with Alvin Lucier. Dykstra contributed to the score of the 2017 psychological thriller/horror film It Comes At Night (dir. Trey Edward Shults), which received the NYT Critic's Pick from A.O. Scott, film critic at the New York Times. He has also worked as a composer on film music for Gus Van Sant's 2011 film Restless, Penny Lane's 2019 documentary Hail Satan?, and the 2019 narrative film Blow the Man Down which was directed by Bridget Savage Cole and Danielle Krudy. His composition work with Frontline documentaries includes Mstyslav Chernov's 20 Days in Mariupol (which won the Audience Award for Best World Cinema Documentary at the 2023 Sundance Film Festival and won the 2024 Academy Award for Best Documentary) and Plot to Overturn The Election, while his work as a music consultant includes the 2023 Peabody Award Winning Michael Flynn's Holy War, American Insurrection, and the Documenting Hate series. Dykstra was a session violist and string director for Dirty Projectors' 2009 album Bitte Orca and has performed at venues worldwide including MOCA, Los Angeles, CA, the RISD Museum in Providence, RI, the Portland Art Museum in Portland, OR, Harpa Concert Hall in Reykjavik, Iceland, and at the Syros Institute in Ano Syros, Greece. In 2024 Dykstra received a BMI Award for his score for 20 Days in Mariupol. In 2025 he scored the documentary Holding Liat (dir. Brandon Kramer and co-produced by Darren Aronofsky), which won the Berlinale Documentary Award at the 2025 Berlin Film Festival.

While in Val Verde, CA in 2015, Jordan Dykstra founded Editions Verde, which publishes art and musical objects.

== Discography ==
=== as Jordan Dykstra (film composer, performer, audio recording engineer, music consultant) ===
- Dark Hollow (2026) - released September 4, 2026
- Holding Liat (2025) - premiered at the 2025 Berlinale Film Festival on February 16, 2025
- Ovid, New York (2024) - premiered at the 2024 Brooklyn Film Festival on June 9, 2024
- 20 Days in Mariupol (2023) PBS Frontline/AP News - premiered at the 2023 Sundance Film Festival on January 20, 2023
- Globes (2021) Avila Film - premiered at 2021 Ji.Hlava International Documentary Film Festival on October 27, 2021
- Magic Hour (2020) - premiered at Tribeca Film Festival on June 18, 2020
- Blow the Man Down (2019) Amazon Studios - premiered at the Tribeca Film Festival on April 26, 2019
- Hail Satan? (2019) Magnolia Pictures - premiered at the 2019 Sundance Film Festival on January 25, 2019
- Documenting Hate (2018) PBS/ProPublica - Emmy nominated 2-part series which premiered on FRONTLINE on August 7, 2017
- It Comes At Night (2017) A24 - premiered at the Overlook Film Festival at Timberline Lodge on April 29, 2017
- Restless (2011) Sony Pictures Classic - premiered at the 2011 Cannes Film Festival on May 12, 2011

=== as Jordan Dykstra ===
- The Arrow of Time - CD for string quintet and percussion, chamber ensemble (2 violas, vibraphone, pedal synthesizer, reed organ), string trio, duet of viola and Sheng, and solo piano with hand-crank siren and fixed playback (New World Records, September 2020)
- 14 Horse Bells - CD for electronics, viola, percussion, and prepared speakers with electronics (Editions Verde, September 2020)
- A Known Unknown - Bundle containing sheet music, CD, and download code - for grand piano, percussion, and electronics (Editions Verde, June 2018)
- Found Clouds - CD for vibraphone, pedal harp, Farfisa organ, and grand piano (Editions Verde, March 2018)
- Is Land a Voice - CD for field recording, air-horns, and sine-tones (Editions Verde, March 2017)
- The Psychological Future - digital LP for gamelan, percussion, viola, cello, double bass, and sine-tones (January 2017)
- Chimes Nine Times - digital EP for viola, electric guitar, and sine-tones (July 2016)
- Stressings - CD (Editions Verde, April 2016)
- Elegant Music - digital EP for viola, koto, noh-kan, ryūteki, and percussion (June 2015)
- Three Horns - digital EP for air-horn and sine-tones in 3 movements (May 2015)
- Like a Sun That Pours Forth Light but Never Warmth - digital LP, composed for Allie Hankins' solo dance show at Conduit Dance Studio in Portland, Ore. from October 24–26, 2014 (January 2015)
- Audition - LP (Marriage Records / Shatter Your Leaves / Modern Documents, August 2014)
- Phonography - digital album of 20 field recordings (March 2014)
- Sundries - ongoing digital album (2013–present)
- Pianodrones - digital EP card in 3 movements (December, 2012)
- A Quiet Night - film score (April, 2011) for "A Quiet Night" (Note: an Official Selection of the Oregon Independent Film Festival in 2012)

=== as DASH! ===
- TSS REMIXES - digital download card (Self released, March 2013)
- Takes Swift Strides - digital download card (Marriage Records, August 2009)
- Live @ Hush feat. What Would Jesus Dub? - digital download (Magic Goat Music, January 2009)
- Is Heterogeneous - CD-R (The Prescott Family, August 2008)
- Gets Unrecovered (No. 0126 e f, Op. 01) - CD-R (The Prescott Family, December 2007)
- The Sioux City Symphony - digital download (The Prescott Family, November 2007)

=== with Alvin Lucier ===
- Out of Our Hands - LP (Important Records, March 2022)

=== with Koen Nutters ===
- In Better Shape Than You Found Me - CD (elsewhere, October 2021)

=== with Beau Breather ===
- College Hotel - CD (Editions Verde, August 2016)

=== with Tom Blood and Jordan Dykstra ===
- Seems Like It Means Something Else from EXP3 (Editions Verde, March 2016)
- Preludes (November 2014)*
- Greatest Hits Live: Volume One (May 2012)*
- A June Afternoon (June 2011)*
- The Act (June 2011)*

*Digital EPs

=== with The Righteous and Harmonious Fists ===
- Fangs, But No Fanks – Split 7-inch EP with White Fang (Marriage Records, 2008)

== Composing Credits ==
=== Film Credits ===
- Dark Hollow — directed by Daniel Byers — composer (Dakoit Pictures, 2026)
- Goodnight Lamby — directed by Dustin Yellin — composer (Protozoa Pictures, 2026)
- Holding Liat — directed by Brandon Kramer — composer (Protozoa Pictures/Meridian Hill Pictures, 2025)
- Hurricane Helene's Deadly Warning — directed by Jonathan Schienberg — composer (PBS Frontline/NPR, 2025)
- Ovid, New York — directed by Vito A. Rowlands — composer (2024)
- Inside the Uvalde Response — directed by Juanita Ceballos — composer (PBS Frontline/ProPublica/The Texas Tribune, 2023)
- Shaken — directed by Asher Levinthal — co-composer (with Brian McOmber), viola, synthesizer, percussion, keyboards (2023)
- Fair Play — directed by Chloe Dumont — score conductor, viola (Netflix, 2023)
- 20 Days in Mariupol — directed by Mstyslav Chernov — composer (PBS Frontline/AP News, 2023)
- Michael Flynn's Holy War — directed by Rick Rowley — music consultant (PBS Frontline/AP News, 2022)
- Plot to Overturn the Election — directed by Sam Black — composer, viola, piano, percussion (PBS Frontline/ProPublica, 2022)
- Globes — directed by Nina de Vroome — piano, viola, percussion, programming (Avila Film, 2021)
- Magic Hour — directed by Che Grayson — synth, viola, percussion, programming (2020) - premiered at Tribeca Film Festival on June 18, 2020
- Blow the Man Down — directed by Bridget Savage Cole and Danielle Krudy — co-composed with Brian McOmber, string arranger, viola, prepared piano, percussion (Amazon Studios, 2020), film soundtrack (Editions Verde, 2020)
- It Comes At Night — directed by Trey Shults — assistant composer with Brian McOmber, string arranger, viola, percussion, musical collaborator, synthesizer and electronics, additional music preparation, recording engineer (A24, 2017), film soundtrack (Milan Records, 2017)
- Annabel's Wake — written by Jordan Dykstra and Danny Elfman — composer and mellotron, Restless (2011 film) directed by Gus Van Sant, film soundtrack (Sony Pictures Classics, 2011)

=== Album Credits ===
- Identify — by Caspar Sonnet — composer and viola, LP (Marriage Records, 2013)
- Belfast Sessions — by Davis Hooker — string trio director, composer, and viola, LP (self-released, 2012)
- Bitte Orca — by Dirty Projectors — string quartet director and viola, LP (Domino Recording Company, 2009)
- Stillness Is The Move — by Dirty Projectors —string quartet director and viola, LP (Domino Recording Company, 2009)
- False Face Society — by Valet — composer and viola, LP (Mexican Summer, 2009)
- Malaikat Dan Singa — by Arrington de Dionyso — composer and viola, LP and CD (K Records, 2009)
- Caffeine, Alcohol, Sunshine, Money — by Jared Mees and the Grown Children — composer, string director, and viola, CD (Tender Loving Empire, 2008)

=== Dance Credits ===
- Like a Sun that Pours Forth Light but Never Warmth — by Allie Hankins — composer, string quintet director, and viola, dance performance (October, 2014)

== Other projects ==
- Rob Walmart - an improvised electronic music collective
