= Holding Liat =

2025 American documentary film

- Promotional film poster
- Directed by: Brandon Kramer
- Produced by: Darren Aronofsky; Yoni Brook; Justin A. Gonçalves; Ari Handel; Lance Kramer; Libby Lenkinski
- Starring: Liat Beinin Atzili; Yehuda Beinin
- Cinematography: Yoni Brook; Omer Manor
- Edited by: Jeff Gilbert
- Music by: Jordan Dykstra
- Production companies: Meridian Hill Pictures; Protozoa Pictures; Kartemquin Films
- Distributed by: Meridian Hill Pictures
- Release dates: February 16, 2025 (Berlinale); January 9, 2026 (United States)
- Running time: 97 minutes
- Country: United States
- Languages: English; Hebrew
- Box office: $81,589

Holding Liat is a 2025 American documentary film, directed by Brandon Kramer. Produced by Darren Aronofsky under his Protozoa Pictures banner. It follows the reaction of Liat Beinin Atzili's family after she and her husband are kidnapped from their home in a kibbutz near the Gaza border during the October 7 attacks.

The film had its world premiere at the Forum section of the 75th Berlin International Film Festival on February 16, 2025, where it won the Berlinale Documentary Film Award.

== Plot ==
During the October 7 attacks Liat Beinin Atzili and her husband Aviv Atzili were kidnapped from their home in a kibbutz near the border. Liat parents, Yehuda and Chaya Beinin, deal with the fear of their daughter's fate. Alongside many other relatives dissatisfied with Benjamin Netanyahu's government disregard of the hostages, Yehuda intensifies his public campaign against the Gaza war, and the inevitability of casualties among the hostages.

Yehuda travels alongside Tal, his youngest daughter, to the United States hoping to gather support against the Israeli government inaction, yet he finds that American politicians unconditional support for Israel is also reflected upon Netanyahu. In Portland, ceasefire demonstrations take place and American academic and historian Joel Beinin, Yehuda's brother, gives a lecture about the Nakba. Through video chat, the brothers' old disagreement over the basic principles of the state of Israel is revealed, as Joel argues that the Kibbutzniks' original socialist ideals were coopted by a colonialist agenda.

Blood found in the Kibbutz is confirmed to be from Aviv, but the IDF still don't know the whereabouts of his body. The kibbutz members mourns their losses, but a feeling of outrage still grips Israeli society. As the first ceasefire is announced, relatives await the final list of released hostages. Tal express her dissatisfaction with the Israeli and American position in a public meeting about the ceasefire. Liat is ultimately released by Hamas. Yehuda and Chaya receive a call from American President Joe Biden, to whom they express gratitude.

Liat reunites with her parents at the hospital, whereupon she realizes something bad must have happened to Aviv. At his funeral, Liat gives a speech and the family dance in his memory. Returning to her kibbutz, she watches through TV the ceasefire demonstrations in Tel Aviv. Three months later, in a Holocaust memorial, Liat talks about the ongoing war and the Palestinian lives on the "other side of the fence".

== Cast ==
- Yehuda Beinin
- Liat Beinin Atzili
- Chaya Beinin
- Tal Beinin
- Joel Beinin
- Netta Atzili
- Ofri Atzili
- Aviv Atzili (archival footage)
- Aya Atzili

== Production ==
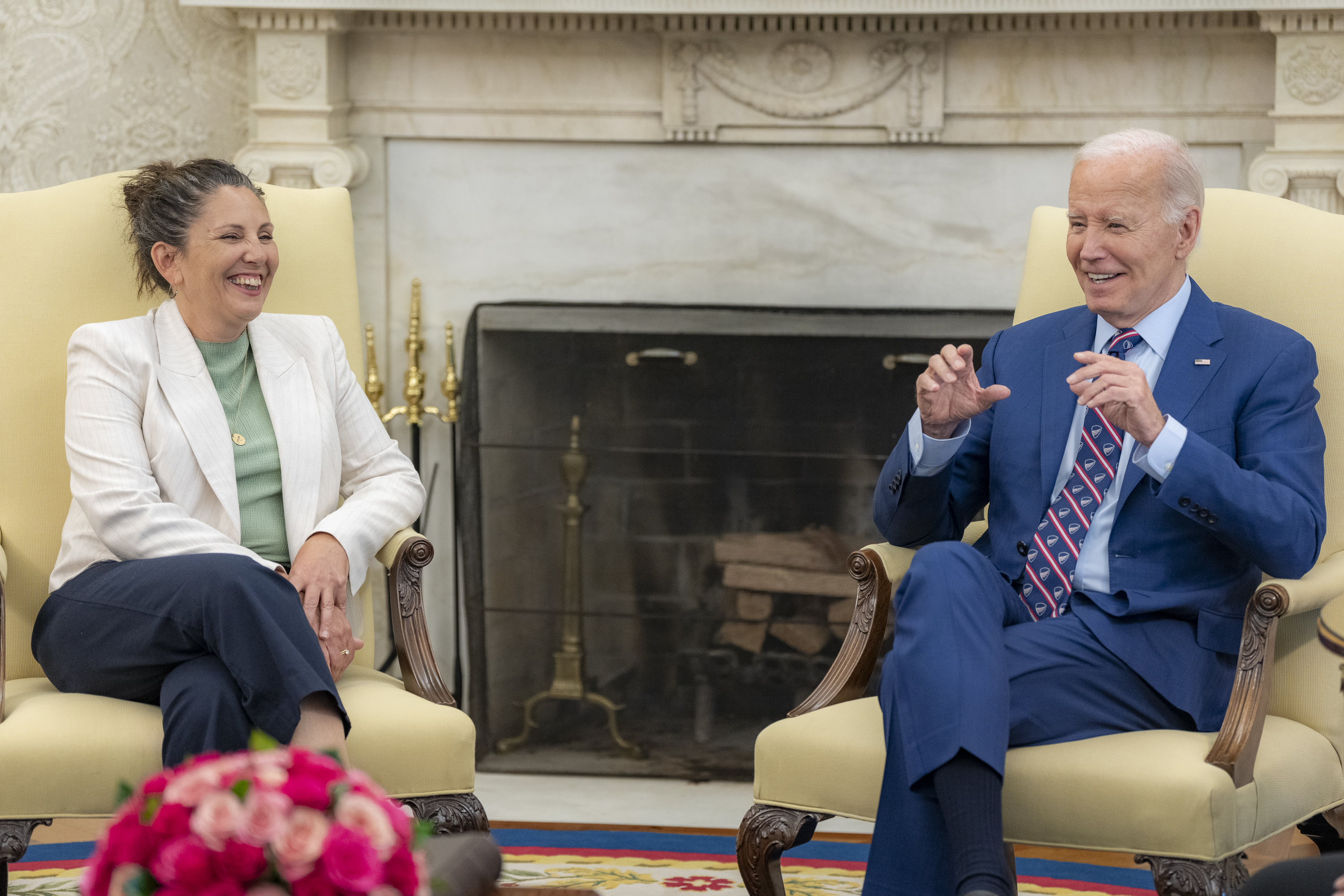
Liat Atzili meets US President Joe Biden in July 2024.

Brandon Kramer, a distant relative, began documenting following the kidnapping of Liat Beinin Atzili, as her father Yehuda Beinin traveled to the United States to advocate for her release. Production additionally took place in Israel, as Beinin reached out to more people to help, expressing disdain for the Israeli government.

== Release ==
The film had its World Premiere at the 75th Berlin International Film Festival on February 16, 2025, where it won the Berlinale Documentary Film Award. Soon after, it had its North American Premiere at Tribeca Festival on June 9, 2025.

The film was first released theatrically by MetFilm in the United Kingdom on September 12, 2025. It is scheduled for theatrical release in the United States in January 2026, beginning with New York's Film Forum. In Israel, the theatrical run will be coordinated by Rotem Heyman followed by a television premiere on Yes.

== Reception ==
On review aggregator website Rotten Tomatoes, the film currently holds a 95% rating based on 22 critics' reviews.

=== Accolades ===
Award	Date	Category	Recipient(s)	Result	Ref.
Berlin International Film Festival	February 22, 2025	Berlinale Documentary Film Award	Holding Liat	Won	
Hamptons International Film Festival	November 7, 2025	Brizzola Family Foundation Award for Films of Conflict & Resoltuion	Holding Liat	Won	
