= Lamp Lit Prose =

Studio album by Dirty Projectors
- Released: July 13, 2018
- Studios: Ivo Shandor (Los Angeles, CA)
- Genre: Progressive pop
- Length: 37:19
- Label: Domino
- Producer: David Longstreth

Dirty Projectors chronology
Dirty Projectors (2017)	Lamp Lit Prose (2018)	5EPs (2020)

Singles from Lamp Lit Prose
- 1. "Break-Thru" Released: May 2, 2018; 2. "That's a Lifestyle" Released: June 14, 2018; 3. "I Feel Energy" Released: July 12, 2018

Lamp Lit Prose is the eighth studio album by American experimental rock group Dirty Projectors, and was released on Domino Records on July 13, 2018.

== Production ==
The album was produced by David Longstreth at his Los Angeles studio.

== Release ==
The band supported the album with a tour, which began in May 2018 with significant personnel changes.

They released the first single off the album, "Break-Thru", on May 2 along with a music video. In Spin, Andy Cush described the single as sounding "more immediately Dirty Projectors-ish than anything on the self-titled album" released in 2017.

On June 14, they released a second single, "That's a Lifestyle", with an animated music video by Kitty Faingold. In Stereogum, Chris DeVille also contrasted this single with the tenor of Dirty Projectors, saying "That's A Lifestyle" echoed earlier albums "Bitte Orca and Swing Lo Magellan, the pop-minded prog exercises that transformed Dirty Projectors from underground oddities to full-fledged indie rock stars. It's a magnificently pretty guitar tapestry that never lets its complexity smother the pop appeal."

On July 12, the day before the album's release, the band released their third single, "I Feel Energy".

== Reception ==
Professional ratings
Aggregate scores
Source	Rating
AnyDecentMusic?	7.3/10
Metacritic	77/100
Review scores
Source	Rating
AllMusic	4/5 stars
The A.V. Club	B+
Entertainment Weekly	B
The Guardian	4/5 stars
The Independent	4/5 stars
Mojo	4/5 stars
NME	4/5 stars
Pitchfork	7.4/10
Rolling Stone	2.5/5 stars
Uncut	8/10

At Metacritic, which assigns a weighted average rating out of 100 to reviews from mainstream publications, this release received an average score of 77, based on 27 reviews. At Rolling Stone, Will Hermes called the album "a flood of ideas and magnificent vocal arrangements" which he found "by turns dazzling and exhausting." Jazz Monroe of Pitchfork praised the album's "more hopeful, chipper kind of songwriting."

== Track listing ==
All tracks are written by David Longstreth, except "(I Wanna) Feel It All" by Longstreth, Nat Baldwin and Mike Johnson.

No.	Title	Length
1.	"Right Now" (featuring Syd)	3:39
2.	"Break-Thru"	3:47
3.	"That's a Lifestyle" (featuring Haim)	4:22
4.	"I Feel Energy" (featuring Amber Mark)	4:37
5.	"Zombie Conqueror" (featuring Empress Of)	3:45
6.	"Blue Bird"	3:49
7.	"Found It in U"	3:27
8.	"What Is the Time"	3:14
9.	"You're the One" (featuring Robin Pecknold and Rostam)	2:18
10.	"(I Wanna) Feel It All" (featuring Dear Nora)	4:21
Total length:		37:19

Bonus tracks
No.	Title	Length
11.	"What Is the Time" (Early Orchestration)	1:23
12.	"You're the One" (Early Orchestration)	2:19
13.	"That's a Lifestyle" (Early Instrumental)	4:14
Total length:		45:15

== Personnel ==
Musicians

- David Longstreth – acoustic guitar (1, 3, 5, 8–10), 12-string guitar (1, 3, 5, 8, 10), electric guitar (1, 3, 5, 8, 10), Juno (1), Rhodes (1, 2, 4, 6, 8, 10), vocals (all), piano (1, 8, 10), drums (1), drum production (1–4, 6–8, 10), guitars (2, 4, 6, 7), Wurlitzer (2, 4, 6, 8, 10), string arrangement (2, 4, 6, 8, 10), bass (2–8), horn arrangement (4, 6, 8, 10), organ (7)
- Syd – vocals (1)
- Lorely Rodriguez (Empress Of) – additional vocals (1), vocals (5)
- Teresa Eggers – additional vocals (1, 4)
- Mauro Refosco – surdo (1), percussion (1, 3, 4, 6, 8)
- Tyondai Braxton – modular processing (1, 8)
- Todd Simon – trumpet (1, 4, 6, 8, 10), cornet (4, 10), flugelhorn (4, 8, 10), French horn (8, 10), euphonium (10)
- Tracy Wannomae – tenor saxophone (1, 6, 8, 10), baritone saxophone (1, 6, 8, 10), bass clarinet (6), recorder (6, 10), alto saxophone (10)
- Mike Johnson – drums (2–8, 10)
- Benjamin Jacobson – violin (2, 8, 10)
- Andrew Bulbrook – violin (2, 8, 10)
- Jonathan Moerschel – viola (2, 8, 10)
- Eric Byers – cello (2, 8)
- Danielle Haim – vocals (3)
- Alana Haim – vocals (3)
- Este Haim – vocals (3)
- Amber Mark – vocals (4)
- Juliane Graf – trombone (4, 6, 8, 10), bass trombone (4, 6, 8, 10), tuba (8)
- Björk – higurashi recording (4)
- Daniel Luna – güira (8)
- Francisco Javier Paredes – bongos (8)
- Nat Baldwin – bass (9, 10)
- Robin Pecknold – vocals (9)
- Rostam Batmanglij – vocals (9)
- Katy Davidson (Dear Nora) – vocals (10)

Technical

- David Longstreth – mixing (except 2)
- Manny Marroquin – mixing (2)
- Greg Calbi – mastering
- Sonny DiPerri – drum engineering (1, 2, 8), percussion engineering (1, 4, 8), guitar engineering (1)
- David Tolomei – drum engineering (3–7, 10), string engineering (2, 4, 10), horn engineering (1, 4, 6, 8, 10), percussion engineering (6), piano engineering (10)
- Miro Mackie – vocal engineering (1, 3–10), piano engineering (1), guitar engineering (9, 10)
- Ryan Tuttle – guitar, Wurlitzer and Rhodes engineering (2, 8), piano engineering (8)
- Robby Moncrieff – guitar engineering (3–7), Rhodes and Wurlitzer engineering (4, 10), bass and organ engineering (7), additional engineering (10)
- Nikolaj Nielsen – Robin Pecknold's vocal engineering (9)
- Logan Patrick – Rostam Batmanglij's vocal engineering (9)

Artwork

- David Longstreth – art direction
- Joe Cariati – glass sculptures
- Jason Frank Rothenberg – photography
- Kelsey Fugere – prop styling
- Teresa Eggers – prop styling
- Rob Carmichael (Seen) – design

== Charts ==
Chart (2018)	Peak position
Belgian Albums (Ultratop Flanders)	122
Japanese Albums (Oricon)	153
UK Independent Albums (Official Charts)	17
US Independent Albums (Billboard)	17
