= Joel Beinin =

American historian (born 1948)

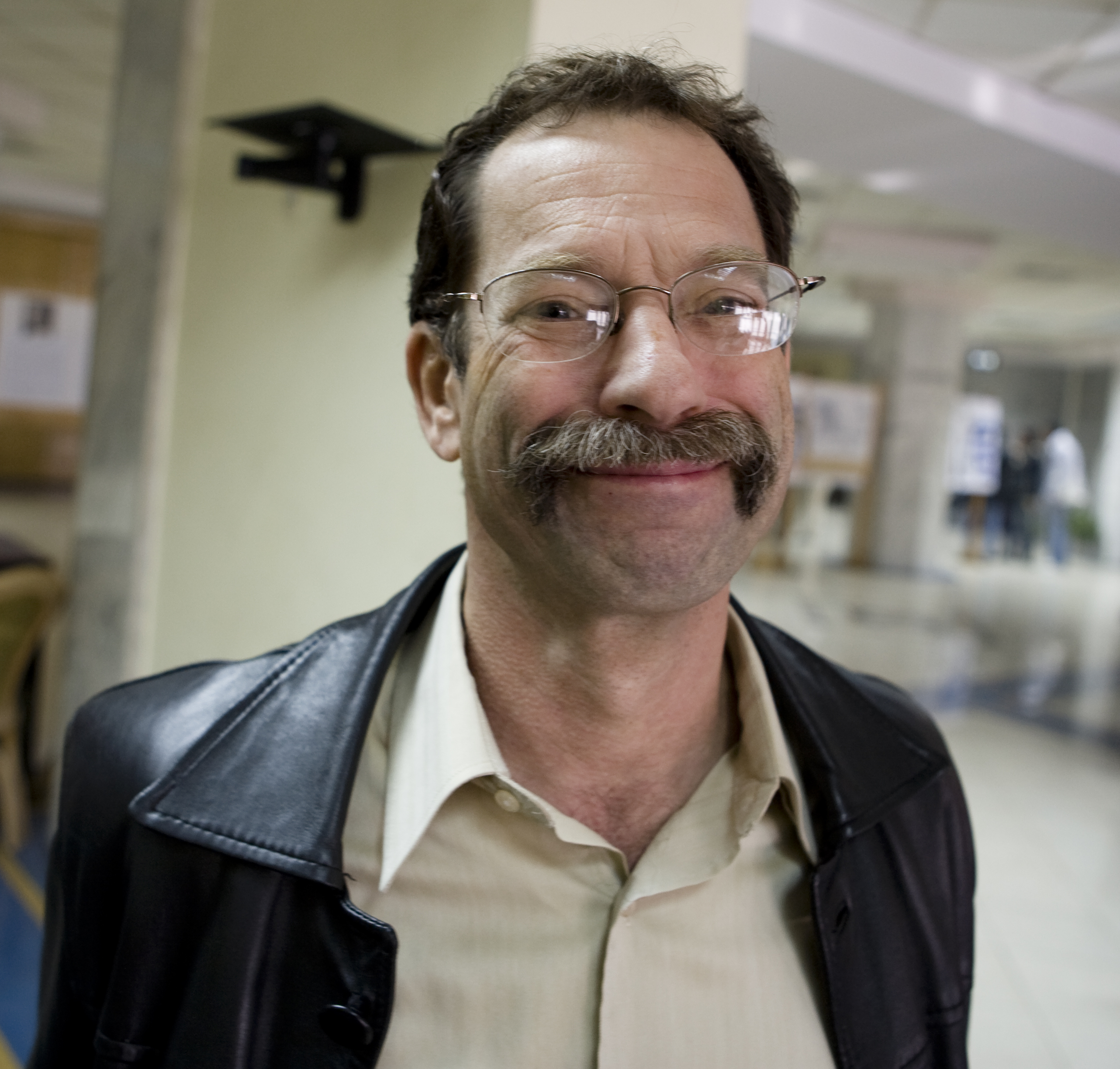
Beinin in 2007 (photo by Hossam el-Hamalawy)

Joel Beinin (born 1948) is an American historian and the Donald J. McLachlan Professor of History and Professor of Middle East history at Stanford University. From 2006 to 2008 he served as director of Middle East studies and professor of history at the American University in Cairo.

== Education ==
Beinin was raised as a Zionist in a secular American Jewish family. On graduating from high school, he spent six months working on a kibbutz, where he met his future wife. He studied Arabic at university, and received his Bachelor of Arts degree from Princeton University in 1970. He spent the summer of 1969 studying Arabic at the American University in Cairo. Intending to move to Israel permanently, he joined other members of Hashomer Hatzair in living and working at Kibbutz Lahav. There, on encountering attitudes that struck him as being contemptuous of Palestinians, he gradually became disenchanted with his early ideals, and declared himself to no longer be a Zionist. He returned to the United States in 1973, and took his M.A. from Harvard University in 1974, and, after working in auto plants in Detroit, obtained his A.M.L.S. and Ph.D. from the University of Michigan in 1978 and 1982, respectively. He has also studied at the Hebrew University of Jerusalem.

== Research and career ==
Beinin's research and writing focuses on workers, peasants, and minorities in the modern Middle East. Though initially interested in the rise of an Arab Working class in Mandatory Palestine, under his thesis supervisor's advice, he changed the topic of his doctoral thesis to a history of the Egyptian labor movement since 1936. The reason for this was that his thesis supervisor believed if he wrote about Israel or Palestine he would be less likely to get an academic job post-graduation. Beinin's Ph.D. thesis ended up being combined with one covering an earlier period of Egyptian labor history by his friend and colleague Zachary Lockman and resulted in the publication of Workers on the Nile: Nationalism, Communism, Islam and the Egyptian Working Class, 1882–1954 (1989). Among his later work is a study of the Jewish communities of modern Egypt which led to his major historical study, The Dispersion Of Egyptian Jewry: Culture, Politics, And The Formation Of A Modern Diaspora (1998), which examines the diversity of Egyptian Jewish identities in Egypt and in the diaspora. He has engaged in fieldwork to collect oral reports among many Egyptian Jewish communities dispersed throughout the world after the Suez War of 1956, among them the Karaites of San Francisco.

Shortly after the September 11, 2001, attacks, Beinin was placed on a list of individuals deemed to be "negligent in defending civilization" (together with 39 other faculty members at U.S. universities) by the American Council of Trustees and Alumni, a conservative non-profit group devoted to curbing liberal tendencies in academia. This was because of a statement he had made, declaring that Osama bin Laden should be tried by an international tribunal.

In 2002 he served as president of the Middle East Studies Association of North America. He served as director of graduate studies in the history department at Stanford University in 2002–2004 and again in 2005–06, but then took a leave of absence from that institution in order to take up a position as director of Middle East studies at the American University in Cairo.

Beinin has written four books and co-edited three others and published many scholarly articles.

He is also active as a commentator on issues regarding Israel, Palestine, and the Arab–Israeli conflict. He has been a contributing editor to Middle East Report and has published articles in, among others, The Nation and Le Monde diplomatique. He is a member of Academia for Equality, an organization working to promote democratization, equality and access to higher education for all communities living in Israel.

In 2006 Beinin sued conservative writer David Horowitz for copyright infringement after Horowitz used Beinin's image on the cover of a booklet entitled "Campus Support for Terrorism." In 2008, the case ended in an out of court settlement in which Horowitz donated $27,500 to charity but admitted no liability.

Beinin described the harm caused by Hamas in their October 7 attacks as both the loss of lives and the exclusion of the group from future international peace discussions. He stated, “They undertook this action in which they committed serious atrocities, violations of international law and war crimes,” adding that the events of October 7 have de facto barred Hamas from participating in any international efforts to resolve the Palestinian question.

== Personal life ==
Beinin's niece, Liat Beinin Atzili, was taken hostage by Hamas in the October 7 Kibbutz Nir Oz attack, and her husband was killed in the same attack. She was released in the 2023 Gaza war ceasefire. He appears in the 2025 documentary Holding Liat.

== Bibliography, books (partial) ==
- Beinin, Joel; Lockman, Zachary: Workers on the Nile: Nationalism, Communism, Islam, and the Egyptian Working Class, 1882–1954, Princeton Univ Pr, U.S.A., 1989, ISBN 0-691-00845-0
- Lockman Zachary and Beinin Joel (ed): Intifada The Palestinian Uprising, South End Press, U.S.A., 1989 ISBN 0-89608-363-2
- Beinin, Joel: Was the Red Flag Flying There?: Marxist Politics and the Arab-Israeli Conflict in Egypt and Israel, 1948–1965, Univ of California 1990 ISBN 0-520-07036-4
- Beinin, Joel: Origins of the Gulf War. Westfield: Open Magazine, 1991
- Joel Beinin, Joe Stork (ed.): Political Islam : Essays from Middle East Report (Merip Reader), University of California Press, 1996, ISBN 0-520-20448-4
- Beinin, Joel: Workers and Peasants in the Modern Middle East, (The Contemporary Middle East) Cambridge University Press, 2001, ISBN 0-521-62121-6
- Rejwan, Nissim/ Beinin, Joel (Foreword): The Last Jews in Baghdad: Remembering a Lost Homeland, University of Texas Press, 2004, ISBN 0-292-70293-0
- Beinin, Joel: The Dispersion Of Egyptian Jewry Culture, Politics, And The Formation Of A Modern Diaspora Berkeley: University of California Press, c1998. Amer Univ in Cairo Pr, 2005, ISBN 977-424-890-2
- Beinin, Joel and Rebecca L Stein: The Struggle for Sovereignty: Palestine And Israel, 1993–2005, (Stanford Studies in Middle Eastern and Islamic Societies and Cultures) Stanford Univ Pr, 2006, ISBN 0-8047-5364-4
