= New Attitude (EP) =

EP by Dirty Projectors
- Released: March 24, 2006
- Recorded: January–September 2005
- Genre: Indie rock
- Length: 30:57
- Label: Marriage Records
- Producer: David Longstreth

Dirty Projectors chronology
The Getty Address (2005)	New Attitude (2006)	Rise Above (2007)

Professional ratings
Review scores
Source	Rating
Pitchfork Media	6.3/10 link

New Attitude is an EP by American experimental rock group Dirty Projectors, released on March 24, 2006, by Marriage Records.

== Track listing ==
All tracks are written by David Longstreth, except where noted.

No.	Title	Writer(s)	Length
1.	"Fucked for Life"		3:23
2.	"Two Sheep Asleep"		4:47
3.	"Imagine It"		3:21
4.	"Likeness of Uncles"		3:29
5.	"Two Young Sheeps"		8:06
6.	"Darkened Car"		3:31
7.	"At the Mall, Pts. 1 & 2"	Longstreth; Adam Forkner	4:03
Total length:			30:57

- "Two Young Sheeps" was recorded live at Columbia University on September 2, 2005.
- "At the Mall, Pts. 1 & 2" is alternately known as "To the Mall" and simply "At the Mall".

== Personnel ==
Credits are adapted from the EP's liner notes.

Dirty Projectors

- David Longstreth – singing, instruments
- Nat Baldwin – double bass (4, 6), bass (5)
- Ezra Koenig – electric piano (5)

Additional musicians

- Adam Forkner – ring modulator (2), vocals (7), programming (7)
- Ezra Seltzer – cello (4, 6)
- Meara Palmer-Young – cello (4, 6)
- Jon Davenport – double bass (4, 6)
- Tim Keiper – drums (5)
- Nathan Michel – electric piano (5)
- Rostam Batmanglij – flute (5), percussion (5)
- Wes Miles – percussion (5)
- Eli Clark – voice (7)
- Sarah Moulton – voice (7)

Production

- Andrei Padlowski – recording engineer (5)
