= Growing (Sleeping People album) =

Studio album by Sleeping People
- Released: October 9, 2007
- Recorded: 2006–2007
- Studio: Big Fish Recording, Encinitas, California
- Genre: Instrumental rock, math rock
- Label: TRL

Sleeping People chronology
Sleeping People (2005)	Growing (2007)

Professional ratings
Review scores
Source	Rating
PrefixMag	7.5/10 stars

Growing is the second studio album by Sleeping People, released on October 9, 2007. The final track, "People Staying Awake", is the only Sleeping People track to feature vocals, which are provided by Joileah Thalmann and Rob Crow from Pinback.

== Track listing ==
1. "Centipede's Dream" (Joileah Maddock) - 1:24
2. "James Spader" - 7:03
3. "Yellow Guy / Pink Eye" - 4:27
4. "Mouth Breeder" - 8:53
5. "...Out Dream" (Kenseth Thibideau) - 2:51
6. "Three Things" - 6:09
7. "Grow Worm" - 4:19
8. "Underland" (Brandon Relf) - 3:22
9. "It's Heart Loves Open" (Kasey Boekholt) - 1:55
10. "People Staying Awake" (lyrics: Rob Crow) - 6:30
