= Dirty Projectors =

American rock group

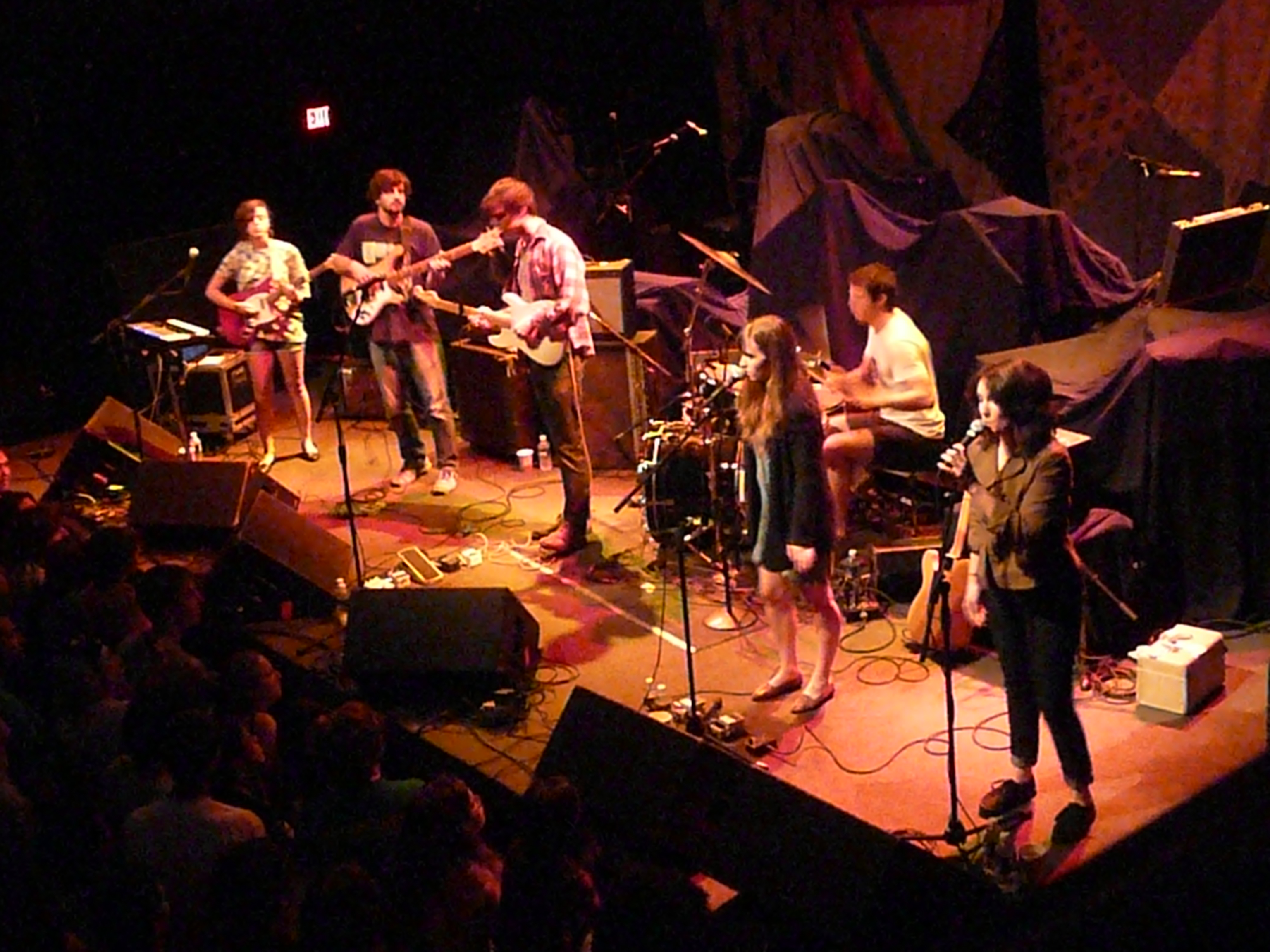
- Dirty Projectors performing in 2009

Background information
- Origin: Brooklyn, New York, U.S.
- Genres: Indie rock; art pop; indie pop; prog pop; chamber pop
- Years active: 2002–present
- Labels: States Rights; Western Vinyl; Marriage; Dead Oceans; Rough Trade; Domino; Nonesuch Records; Joyful Noise Recordings; New Amsterdam Records
- Members: David Longstreth; Karl McComas-Reichl; Christopher Bear
- Past members: See Former members
- Website: dirtyprojectors.net

Dirty Projectors is an American indie rock band from Brooklyn, New York, formed in 2002. The band is the project of singer-songwriter David Longstreth, who has served as the band's sole constant member throughout numerous line-up changes. The band is currently a trio featuring Longstreth, Karl McComas-Reichl (bass) and Christopher Bear (drums).

Since its formation, Dirty Projectors has released ten full-length studio albums, with the project featuring major contributions from co-lead vocalist and guitarist Amber Coffman from 2006 to 2013. Following the release of Rise Above (2007), an album of Black Flag songs as re-imagined from memory, Dirty Projectors released their break-through album, Bitte Orca in 2009. Featuring lead vocals from Longstreth, Coffman, and Angel Deradoorian, the album received widespread critical acclaim and increased the band's exposure significantly. Its follow-up, Swing Lo Magellan (2012), was released to further acclaim.

Following the departure of Coffman in 2013, Longstreth focused Dirty Projectors into a mostly studio-based project, releasing the albums, Dirty Projectors and Lamp Lit Prose, in 2017 and 2018, respectively. Dirty Projectors became a full band once again in 2018 with the addition of co-lead vocalists Felicia Douglass, Maia Friedman and Kristin Slipp to tour in support of Lamp Lit Prose. Inspired by the chemistry and dynamic of the band's current line-up, the group recorded and released five EPs across 2020.

In 2024, former member Olga Bell returned to the band's line-up ahead of performances of an orchestral song cycle, named Song of the Earth, which was released as a studio album in April 2025 on Nonesuch Records. In late 2025, Longstreth repurposed Dirty Projectors into a trio, featuring bassist Karl McComas-Reichl and Grizzly Bear drummer Christopher Bear.

== History ==
=== 2002–2007: Early years and Rise Above ===
While studying at Yale, Longstreth spent part of the years 2001 and 2002 working on a number of musical ideas, together with his brother Jake. This resulted in the album, The Graceful Fallen Mango, that was released in 2002 under his own name and introduced his distinctive use of song arrangements and his combination of lo-fi and hi-fi production.

Morning Better Last!, released in September 2003, brought together three tapes recorded by Longstreth in the period 2001 to 2002. A year later they were compiled and released by States Rights Records on CD-R and as a digital download from iTunes.

With the help of Adam Forkner of Yume Bitsu, Longstreth recorded and released The Glad Fact on the Western Vinyl label under the name "The Dirty Projectors" in 2003. Two years later, the band released The Getty Address, a concept album about the musician Don Henley that features extensive orchestral and choral accompaniment. The stripped-down New Attitude EP followed in 2006 and featured inklings of the band's later vocal interplay and guitar work.

In 2007, the band released Rise Above, an album of Black Flag songs as re-imagined from memory. The album introduced the band's distinctive contrast between Longstreth's vocals and the hocketed harmonies of Amber Coffman and Susanna Waiche, who was later replaced by Angel Deradoorian.

=== 2008–2011: Domino Records, Bitte Orca, and Mount Wittenberg Orca ===
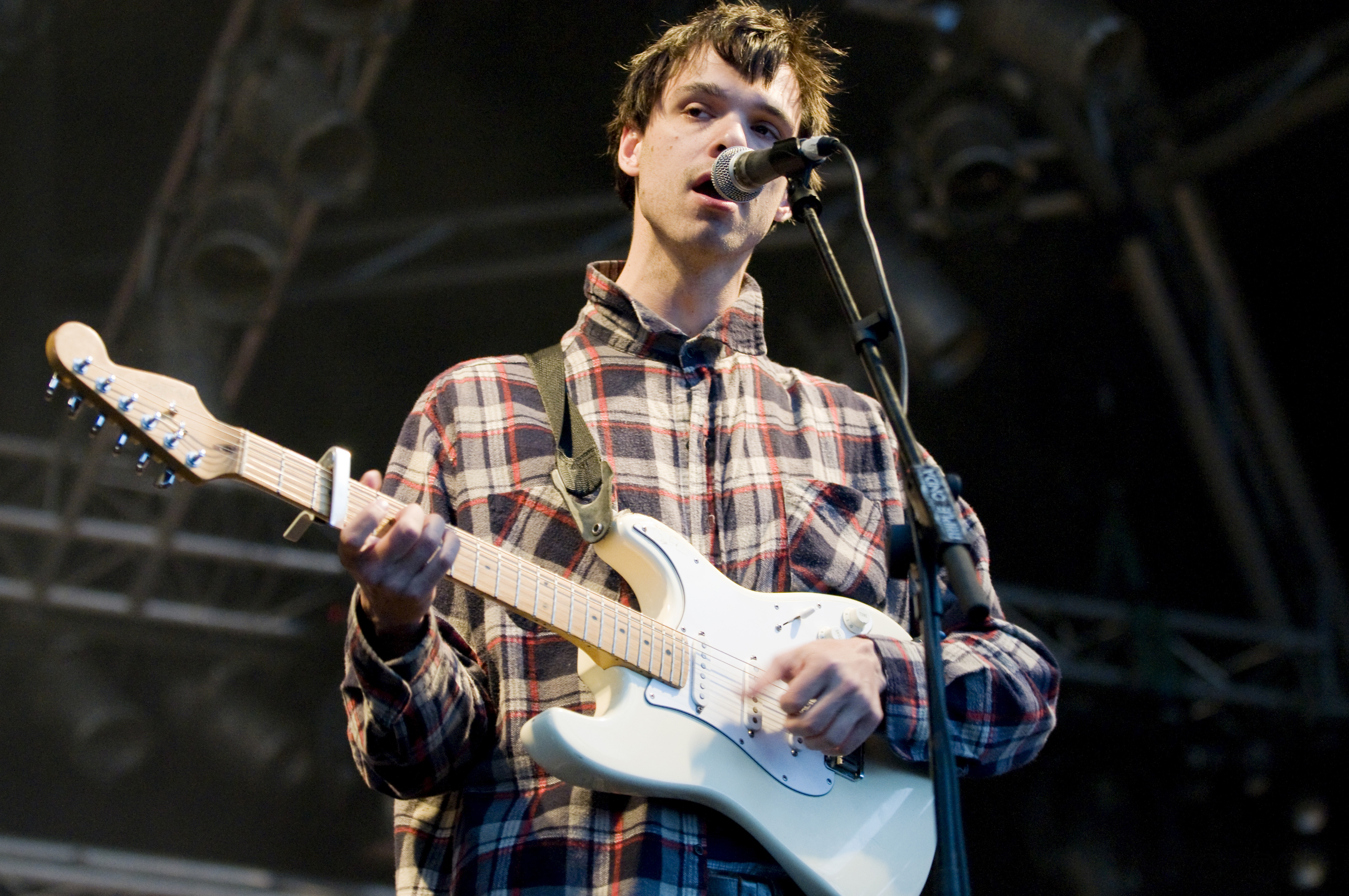
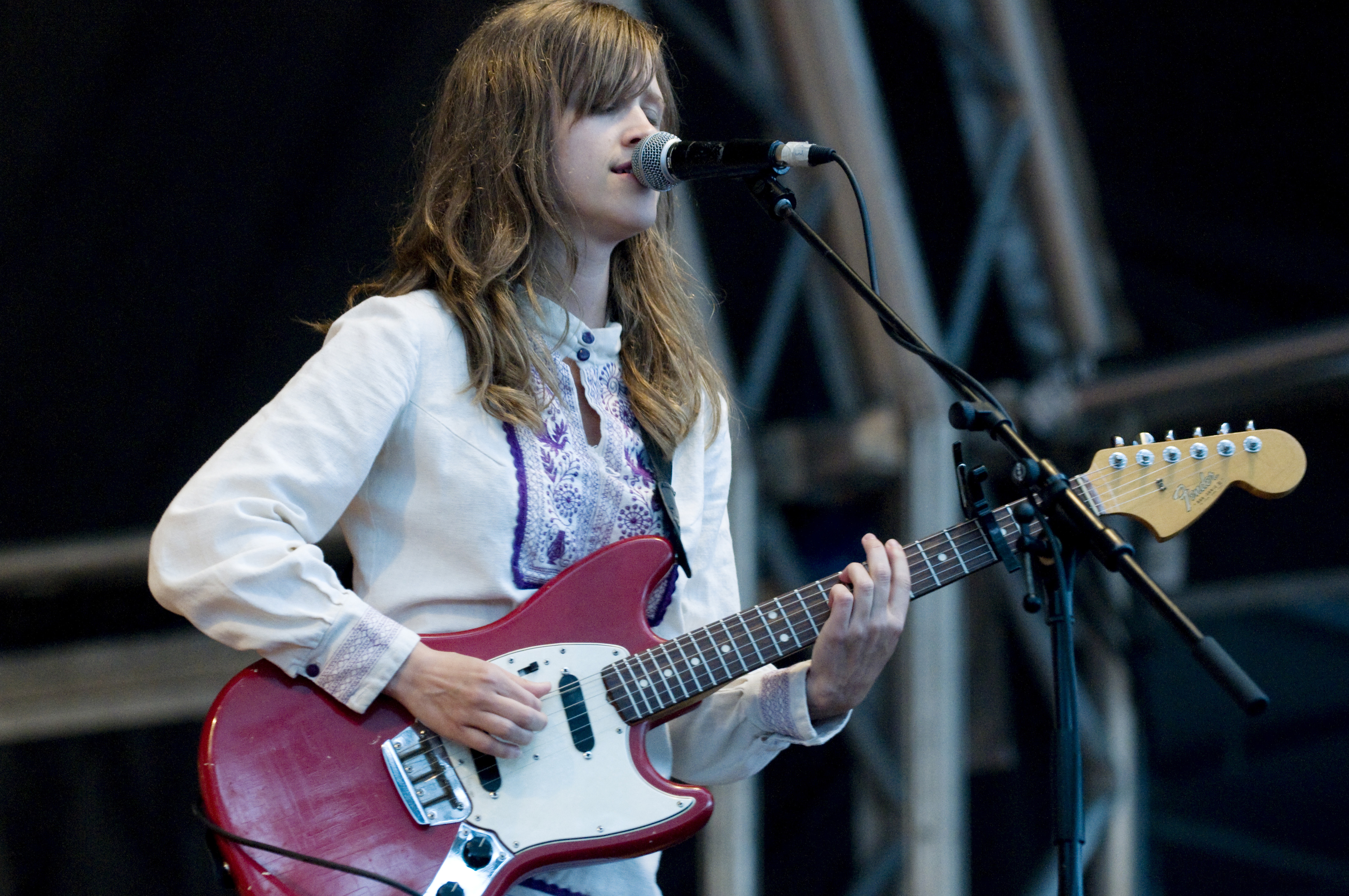
Longstreth and Coffman performing in 2008

In April 2008, Dirty Projectors signed with Domino Records, and the label announced the release of their fifth full-length album, Bitte Orca, for June 9, 2009. Bitte Orca introduced additional backing vocalist/auxiliary percussionist Haley Dekle as a new member and bassist Nat Baldwin returning to the band (he previously was a member of Dirty Projectors from 2005 to 2006). That year, the band also collaborated with David Byrne on the song "Knotty Pine" for the compilation album Dark Was the Night produced by the Red Hot Organization. Byrne joined the Dirty Projectors onstage to perform this song, along with "Ambulance Man," another collaborative track not included on the compilation, at the "Dark Was the Night Live" concert at New York City's Radio City Music Hall on May 3, 2009.

“Stillness Is the Move" was the first single released from Bitte Orca, a West African and alternative R&B-influenced hybrid, sung by Coffman and inspired by the Wim Wenders film Wings of Desire. Bitte Orca was met with positive reviews, including Rolling Stone magazine rating the album as number 6 on their best 25 albums of 2009.

Dirty Projectors were to release a new EP in September 2009 titled Temecula Sunrise. While the EP was never released, two of its tracks, "Ascending Melody" and "Emblem of the World", were instead offered for free download on the Dirty Projectors website in early 2010.

On May 8, 2009, members of Dirty Projectors collaborated with Björk to perform an original composition by Longstreth, written for five voices and acoustic guitar, as part of a charity concert to benefit Housing Works, a nonprofit organization dedicated to providing shelter for homeless men, women, and children suffering from AIDS. The concert was held at the Housing Works Bookstore & Café in downtown New York City. On June 30, 2010, Dirty Projectors announced the release of Mount Wittenberg Orca, a digital-only EP with Björk based on the artists' collaboration. Mount Wittenberg Orca was released physically by Domino Records in 2011.

=== 2012–2015: Swing Lo Magellan ===
On March 30, 2012, Dirty Projectors released the first single from their sixth album, Swing Lo Magellan, "Gun Has No Trigger". The album was released on July 10 in the United States and on July 9 internationally.

On September 7, 2012, Dirty Projectors released a short film, directed by Longstreth, called "Hi Custodian".

On November 6, 2012, Dirty Projectors released About to Die EP, a digital- and vinyl-release EP featuring several new tracks.

In 2015, members of Dirty Projectors made a cameo appearance as themselves in the Noah Baumbach film Mistress America.

=== 2016–2019: Dirty Projectors, Lamp Lit Prose, and new line-up ===
On September 19, 2016, Dirty Projectors began releasing videos and images on social media teasing new music. After the release of tracks "Keep Your Name", "Little Bubble" and "Up in Hudson", it was announced that the seventh, self-titled album, would be released on February 24, 2017 via Domino. The album was ultimately released three days early, on February 21, 2017. It marked a return to the group's solo roots for Longstreth (who at this point relocated to Los Angeles, California to build a recording studio called "Ivo Shandor"), introduced a more electronic-based alternative R&B sound, and addressed his breakup with Coffman, his former bandmate and girlfriend.

The following year, on July 13, 2018, Dirty Projectors released their eighth album, Lamp Lit Prose, after teasing three singles, "Break Thru", "That's a Lifestyle", and "I Feel Energy". The touring of the album marked the revival of Dirty Projectors as a group project, with David Longstreth on lead vocals and guitar; returning members Nat Baldwin and Mike Daniel Johnson on bass/bass synth and drums, respectively; and introducing Maia Friedman on guitar, keyboards, and backing vocals, Felicia Douglass on percussion, keyboards, and backing vocals, and Kristin Slipp on keyboards and backing vocals.

In late 2018, the band recorded a live in-studio album at New York City's Power Station to capture road-tested live arrangements of songs they had been performing on the Lamp Lit Prose tour. The album, Sing the Melody was released on December 10, 2019 on Domino Documents.

=== 2020–2025: 5EPs and Song of the Earth ===
In 2020, the band announced that it would release five EPs throughout the year, with Longstreth noting: "For me, this cycle of EPs is about growth, transition, liminal space, shifting identity. Allen Ginsberg had a phrase, 'first thought, best thought,' to talk about a particular kind of writing — not automatic writing exactly, but quick, spontaneous, trusting. For me, these songs are about rediscovering that place, after the stereo ouroboros of the Ivo Shandor [Studio] era (Dirty Projectors & Lamp Lit Prose). And I think for us — Felicia, Maia, Kristin, Mike and me — it’s about finding it for the first time: playing, writing, learning together as a new band."

The first EP, Windows Open was released on March 27, 2020. The EP featured lead vocals and writing from Friedman with writing, production, and mixing handled by Longstreth. Oliver Hill from Vagabon added string arrangements to the release. The second EP, Flight Tower, appeared in May. It featured lead vocals from Douglass, and was preceded by the single, "Lose Your Love". Outlets like Pitchfork praised Douglass' smooth, cool idiosyncratic vocal contributions. Early September the Bossa Nova inspired Super João appeared. This was followed by the Earth Crisis EP in October, which featured lead vocals from Slipp and arrangements for string quartet and wind quintet by Longstreth. The recordings of these arrangements, which provide the backbone of the EP's sound, were initially made with Chris Taylor in 2008 as orchestral reinterpretations of 2007's Rise Above, and then re-sampled by Longstreth in the production of Earth Crisis. The EP was accompanied by a short film directed by Isaiah Saxon. The final installment entitled Ring Road, featuring all five members, was released in November. The record company compiled all five as the 20-track album, 5EPs.

Following the release of 5EPs, Longstreth worked on an orchestral song cycle, named Song of the Earth, which received its full live debut in March 2024 at a sold-out performance with the Los Angeles Philharmonic at Disney Hall in Los Angeles. Prior to this, several work-in-progress performances took place between 2022 and 2024 at the Barbican in London, the Elbphilharmonie in Hamburg and Muziekgebouw aan 't IJ in Amsterdam.

Inspired by climate change, Longstregth noted: "The need for this music arose in a few days in Fall of 2020, when [my partner] was pregnant with our daughter. The fires in California were insane. We got on an empty flight to Juneau. It was the middle of the pandemic; no one was flying. The irony of escaping the fires by burning more carbon." In 2024, former member Olga Bell returned to the band's line-up ahead of several Song of the Earth performances, and a full-length studio album of the song cycle, was released in April 2025 on Nonesuch Records.

=== 2025–present: Dirty Projectors Trio, final Song of Earth performance and new material ===
In late 2025, Longstreth repurposed Dirty Projectors into a trio, featuring bassist Karl McComas-Reichl and Grizzly Bear drummer Christopher Bear. In a December Substack post, Longstreth confirmed that the trio had recorded a full-length studio album together: "When Karl, Chris and I sojourned up to Northern California a few weeks ago, we — to put it millenially — recorded a thing. 'It’s not an object — it’s an album' as Uncle Chat might say."

On April 14, 2026, the Song of the Earth line-up of the band—Longstreth, Maia Friedman, Olga Bell and Felicia Douglass—performed the song cycle in full with the Austin Symphony Orchestra at Long Center for the Performing Arts in Austin, Texas. Longstreth noted that this was the only remaining performance of the cycle planned: "There are currently no concrete plans to sing the Song anywhere else on Earth — not New York, not London, not Sydney, not Berlin, but we’re doing it in Austin, where the stars at night are big and bright, a mile or so from the Old Hideout Theater on congress where I laptop-karaoked The Getty Address as SXSW 2005."

On November 10, 2026, Longstreth announced that Dirty Projectors had signed to Joyful Noise Recordings with the release of a new single, "Jumbotron". On the day of the song's release, Longstreth stated: "I really started writing on the piano when our daughter was born. Small worlds exploring family, parenthood, childhood. "Jumbotron" is one of those songs, and today it’s out in the world. Maybe because these songs started so far inside my psyche, they’ve taken an extra long time make it into the world. (that, and i had no idea how to play the piano). I started em five years ago; workshopped em on the tba-DLo tour as the pandy receded; recorded em with the brilliant and beautiful duo of Chris Bear on drums and Karl McComas-Reichl on bass (exactly a year ago), met the good people at Joyful Noise records, did residencies in LA and NY last winter and spring — and at last here we are!"

== Musical style ==
According to Wyndham Wyeth of Paste Magazine, "Dirty Projectors have a history of creating delightfully grandiose records full of complex, sprawling arrangements and bizarre concepts."

Dirty Projectors have been described musically as an indie rock, art pop, indie pop, prog pop and chamber pop group.

While often associated with the late 2000s New York indie rock scene, critics have linked Dirty Projectors to musicians from many genres, including new wave artists David Byrne and Squeeze, pop stars Beyoncé and Mariah Carey, and progressive rock musicians Frank Zappa and Yes. In a 2009 interview, Longstreth embraced some of these comparisons but expressed a dislike for several of those musicians, commenting, "Steely Dan is a band I’m not that into," "I’m not a huge Yes guy," and "Frank Zappa I fucking hate."

== Members ==
=== Current members ===
Dirty Projectors Trio

- David Longstreth – lead vocals, guitar, various instruments (2002–present)
- Karl McComas-Reichl – bass (2025–present)
- Christopher Bear – drums (2006, 2025–present)

=== Former members ===
- Adam Forkner – drums (2002–2005)
- Jake Longstreth – backing vocals (2002; 2016)
- Yasemin Schatz – flute (2004)
- Rostam Batmanglij – flute, keyboards, percussion, backing vocals (2004–2005)
- Larkin Grimm – backing vocals (2004–2005)
- Jona Bechtolt – keyboards, drums (2004–2005)
- Ezra Koenig – saxophone, guitar, electric piano, backing vocals (2004–2005; 2016)
- Wes Miles – saxophone, backing vocals (2005)
- Anneli Chambliss – backing vocals (2005)
- Emily Cheeger – backing vocals (2005)
- Alex Farrill – keyboards, drums, backing vocals (2005)
- Spencer Kingman – guitar, backing vocals (2005–2006)
- Charlie Looker – guitar, backing vocals (2005–2006)
- Will Glass – drums (2005–2006)
- Nat Baldwin – bass, keyboards (2005–2006; 2007–2013; 2016; 2017; 2018–2019)
- Susanna Waiche – backing vocals (2006)
- Brian McOmber – drums (2006–2012)
- Amber Coffman – co-lead and backing vocals, guitar (2006–2013)
- Sharon Nakhimovsky – violin (2007)
- Jessica Pavone – viola (2007)
- Angel Deradoorian – co-lead and backing vocals, guitar, keyboards, bass (2007–2012; 2013)
- Jordan Dykstra – viola (2008–2009)
- Haley Louise Dekle – percussion, backing vocals (2008–2013)
- Olga Bell – keyboards, lead and backing vocals (2011–2013; 2017; 2024–2026)
- Jenn Wasner – guitar, backing vocals (2012)
- Clarice Jensen – viola (2012; 2017)
- Nadia Sirota – viola (2012; 2017)
- Mike Daniel Johnson – drums (2012–2013; 2017–2025)
- Steve Marion – guitar, backing vocals (2013)
- Tyondai Braxton – keyboards (2017)
- Mauro Refosco – percussion (2017)
- Francisco Javier Paredes – percussion (2017)
- Teresa Eggers – backing vocals (2017)
- Kristin Slipp – keyboards, lead and backing vocals (2018–2024)
- Maia Friedman – guitar, keyboards, lead and backing vocals (2018–2026)
- Felicia Douglass – percussion, keyboards, lead and backing vocals (2018–2026)

== Discography ==
=== Studio albums ===
- The Glad Fact (2003)
- Morning Better Last! (2003)
- Slaves' Graves and Ballads (2004)
- The Getty Address (2005)
- Rise Above (2007)
- Bitte Orca (2009)
- Swing Lo Magellan (2012)
- Dirty Projectors (2017)
- Lamp Lit Prose (2018)
- Song of the Earth (2025)

=== Compilation albums ===
- 5EPs (2020)

=== EPs ===
- New Attitude (2006)
- Mount Wittenberg Orca (2010) (with Björk)
- About to Die (2012)
- Windows Open (2020)
- Flight Tower (2020)
- Super João (2020)
- Earth Crisis (2020)
- Ring Road (2020)

=== Live albums ===
- Sing the Melody (2019)
