= About to Die =

EP by Dirty Projectors
- Released: November 6, 2012
- Genres: Indie rock; art pop; experimental
- Length: 12:11
- Label: Domino

Dirty Projectors chronology
Swing Lo Magellan (2012)	About to Die (2012)	Dirty Projectors (2017)

About to Die is an extended play studio album by American experimental rock group Dirty Projectors, released digitally and on vinyl on November 6, 2012.

== Recording ==
The album's first track, "About to Die", is taken from Dirty Projectors' 2012 release Swing Lo Magellan. Another track, "While You're Here", was written by Dave Longstreth following TV on the Radio bassist Gerard Smith's death in 2011.

== Reception ==
Professional ratings
Review scores
Source	Rating
AbsolutePunk	6.1/10
Consequence of Sound	C+
Paste	8.1/10
Pitchfork Media	7.3/10
Popmatters	6/10
Under the Radar	7/10 stars

About to Die received general acclaim from music critics. At Metacritic, which assigns a normalized rating out of 100 to reviews from mainstream critics, the album received an average score of 74, based on 5 reviews, indicating "Generally favorable reviews".

Consequence of Sound's Adam Kivel commented that About to Die "offers a bite-sized take of the entirety of Swing Lo Magellan", adding that it "doesn't outshine its older sibling, but it certainly acts as a logical and warm companion." Pitchfork Media's Mike Powell called About to Die a "refreshingly basic album" and "a cherry on a cupcake" for Dirty Projectors.

== Track listing ==
No.	Title	Length
1.	"About to Die"	4:01
2.	"While You're Here"	2:05
3.	"Here Til It Says I'm Not"	3:19
4.	"Simple Request"	2:46
