= Jake Longstreth =

American painter (born 1977)

- Born: John Pullman Longstreth Jr. February 3, 1977 (age 49); Amenia, New York, U.S.
- Education: Lewis & Clark College (BA); California College of the Arts (MFA)
- Spouse: Hannah Fidell (m. 2017)
- Children: 1
- Relatives: David Longstreth (brother)
- Website: jakelongstreth.com

John Pullman "Jake" Longstreth Jr. (born February 3, 1977) is an American painter, musician, and radio personality. He is currently the co-host of the Apple Music 1 show, Time Crisis with Ezra Koenig and member of a Grateful Dead cover band, Richard Pictures, as well as his own musical outfit, Mountain Brews.

== Education ==
Longstreth received his Bachelor of Arts in 1999 from Lewis & Clark College in Portland, Oregon, and his Master of Fine Arts in 2005 from California College of the Arts in San Francisco, California.

== Career ==
He is a 2008 recipient of the Pollock-Krasner Foundation Grant. His paintings can be found in the collections at the Crocker Art Museum, the Whitney Museum of American Art Library, and JP Morgan Chase, among others.

Longstreth tends to portray architecture in flat, geometric forms, recalling influences such as Robert Bechtle and David Hockney, finding a place between “documentary” realism and symbolic metaphor, whereas his landscapes are portrayed as more of an improvised realism.

He makes regular appearances as a co-host and former "West Coast correspondent" on Time Crisis, the Apple Music internet radio show hosted by Vampire Weekend's Ezra Koenig, where he frequently gives in-depth investigative reports on various topics such as the history of the Frito-Lay corporation, PepsiCo, and the National Rifle Association of America (NRA). Longstreth is also a guitarist in the Grateful Dead cover band, Richard Pictures. In 2016, he made several appearances with Vampire Weekend and Dirty Projectors as a supporting musician during their performances for Bernie Sanders' campaign for the Democratic presidential nomination. Richard Pictures continued to perform with Vampire Weekend at various live shows such as the 2018 Ojai performance, and opened for the band at several venues for their 2019 Father of the Bride tour. In June 2019, Longstreth released an EP with rock group Mountain Brews, and in January 2020 the group released their second EP, Let It Grow. On Wednesday, October 9, 2019, during their two-night concert series at Red Rocks, Vampire Weekend covered Longstreth's "Mountain Brews," the title track from the EP of the same name. Longstreth's third EP with Mountain Brews, Raised in a Place, released on November 7.

== Personal life ==
Longstreth is the older brother of David Longstreth, the lead singer and guitarist of Dirty Projectors. He married filmmaker Hannah Fidell on September 23, 2017, in Inverness, California.
