= Slaves' Graves and Ballads =

Slaves' Graves & Ballads

Studio album by Dirty Projectors
- Released: June 8, 2004
- Recorded: July–December 2002
- Genres: Art rock; indie rock; chamber music
- Length: 39:33
- Label: Western Vinyl
- Producer: David Longstreth

Dirty Projectors chronology
Morning Better Last! (2003)	Slaves' Graves & Ballads (2004)	The Getty Address (2005)

Professional ratings
Review scores
Source	Rating
AllMusic	4/5 stars
Pitchfork	8.1/10

Slaves' Graves and Ballads is the third studio album by American experimental rock band Dirty Projectors, released on June 8, 2004, by Western Vinyl. Per its title, it is a double album comprising two different recordings, entitled Slaves' Graves and Ballads.

== Background and recording ==
The two halves feature drastically different sounds: the first features frontman and guitarist David Longstreth accompanied by a chamber ensemble called the Orchestral Society for the Preservation of the Orchestra; the second features Longstreth and his guitar recorded by Adam Forkner.

Slaves' Graves was recorded in December 2002, at Dwight Chapel in New Haven, Connecticut; Ballads was recorded from July to August 2002, at Dub Narcotic Studio in Olympia, Washington, and an unnamed location in Southbury, Connecticut.

== Track listing ==
All tracks are written by Dave Longstreth.

Disc 1: Slaves' Graves
No.	Title	Length
1.	"Somberly, Kimberly"	1:22
2.	"On the Beach"	3:40
3.	"(Throw On) The Hazard Lights"	4:11
4.	"Slaves' Graves"	3:03
5.	"Grandfather's Hanging"	3:31
6.	"We Are Swaddled"	1:25
7.	"Hazard Lights (Reprise)"	2:02
Total length:		19:17

Disc 2: Ballads
No.	Title	Length
1.	"A Labor More Restful"	3:41
2.	"Unmoved"	3:01
3.	"Ladies, You Have Exiled Me"	2:54
4.	"Because Your Light Is Turning Green"	3:15
5.	"Obscure Wisdom"	1:34
6.	"This Weather"	2:27
7.	"Since I Opened"	3:19
Total length:		20:15 39:33

- Tracks 1.4–1.6 form one continuous suite of songs.

== Personnel ==
Credits are adapted from the album's liner notes.

Dirty Projectors

- David Longstreth – artwork, recording engineer, vocals, guitar, conductor (1.1–1.7)

Additional musicians

- "Orchestral Society for the Preservation of the Orchestra":
  - Adam Bionarz – bass drum (1.1–1.7), maracas (1.1–1.7), triangle (1.1–1.7)
  - Ezra Seltzer – cello (1.1–1.7)
  - Hank Miller – clarinet (1.1–1.7)
  - Yasemin Schatz – flute (1.1–1.7)
  - Sam Bernstein – horns (1.1–1.7)
  - Emily Rostetter – oboe (1.1–1.7)
  - Elana Arian – violin (1.1–1.7)
  - Jon Zalben – violin (1.1–1.7)
- Adam Forkner – drums (2.2), trumpet (2.6, 2.7)

Production

- Jason NeSmith – mastering engineer
- Adam Forkner – recording engineer (2.1–2.7)
