= Ava Luna =

US musical group

- Origin: Brooklyn, New York, United States
- Genres: Indie rock; soul; R&B; dance punk
- Years active: 2009–present
- Label: Western Vinyl
- Members: Ethan Bassford; Felicia Douglass; Julian Fader; Carlos Hernandez
- Past members: Judnick Mayard; Alex Smith; Siheun Song; Nathan Tompkins; Kye Grant Kauffman (formerly Becca Kauffman)
- Website: avaluna.bandcamp.com

Ava Luna is an experimental indie band from Brooklyn, New York, United States.

== Reviews ==
The band's 2012 album Ice Level was reviewed in Pitchfork by Paul Thompson who says "The genre-bending New York synth-funk septet create a glorious mess on their full-length debut.". The songs from 2014's Electric Balloon "stick in your head in a way their earlier material didn't" according to Lindsay Zoladz from Pitchfork. Tess Duncan of Pitchfork said of 2015's Infinite House that "The album has a loose, playful energy, and always seems to be ready to pounce on you."

== Members ==
Current

- Carlos Hernandez – vocals, guitar (2005–present)
- Julian Fader – drums (2005–2007, 2010–present)
- Felicia Douglass – keyboard, vocals (2008–present)
- Ethan Bassford – bass (2010–present)

Former

- Judnick Mayard – vocals (2008–2009)
- Alex Smith – drums (2007–2010)
- Siheun Song – vocals (2007–2010)
- Nathan Tompkins – keyboard (2005–2013)
- Kye Grant Kauffman (formerly Becca Kauffman) – keyboard, vocals, guitar (2009–2019)

== Discography ==
=== Albums ===
- Lemming (2007, self-released)
- Ice Level (2012, Infinite Best)
- Electric Balloon (2014, Western Vinyl)
- Infinite House (2015, Western Vinyl)
- Histoire de Melody Nelson (2018, Turntable Kitchen)
- Moon 2 (2018, Western Vinyl)
- Live at Market Hotel (2020, Western Vinyl)
- Ava Luna (2025, Western Vinyl)

=== Compilations ===
- Takamatsu Station (2015, self-released)

=== EPs ===
- 3rd Avenue Island (2009, Cooling Pie Records)
- Services EP (2010, Cooling Pie Records/Environmental Aesthetics)
- Pigments EP (2019, Western Vinyl)

=== Singles ===
- Wrenning Day (2012, Inflated Records)
- Water Duct (2012, Weathervane Music)
- Rain Flexi (2015, Father/Daughter Records)
- Israelites Flexi (2015, Joyful Noise Recordings)
