= The Getty Address =

Studio album by Dirty Projectors
- Released: April 5, 2005
- Recorded: 2005
- Genres: Chamber music; avant-pop; indie rock; glitch
- Length: 56:18
- Label: Western Vinyl
- Producer: Dave Longstreth

Dirty Projectors chronology
Slaves' Graves and Ballads (2004)	The Getty Address (2005)	New Attitude (2006)

The Getty Address is the fourth studio album by American experimental rock group Dirty Projectors, released on April 5, 2005, by Western Vinyl. The album is a concept album and is described as a "glitch opera" about musician Don Henley, although it also explores themes such as ancient Mexico, post-9/11 America, and oil.

== Background and recording ==
25 musicians are featured on the album, most of whom contributed to the orchestral and choral backing of the album. These parts were recorded at Yale University as well as other locations in New Haven, Connecticut, over a period spanning five months, and were then chopped up digitally to create backing tracks for many of the songs from the album. Dave Longstreth overdubbed his own vocals, guitar, bass, and other instruments to create the songs on the album. Although the lyrics have been described as gibberish, the words tell a narrative beginning with Don Henley contemplating suicide, and ending with the last of Longstreth's songs about brown finches.

Jason Crock, in a review for Pitchfork, noted that "Longstreth's thorough deconstruction of classical elements gives the colonization theme [of "confrontation between Hernan Cortes and the Aztecs in the early 16th century"] some precedence".

In a letter to Henley, Longstreth described the album's ambitious themes as examining the question of "what is wilderness in a world completely circumscribed by highways, once Manifest Destiny has no place to go - but in the end it is a love story". Despite seeming a "disjointed listen" in which songs toss "verse-chorus-verse out the window", the New York Times' Jon Pareles finds the album "far more a contemporary chamber opera than indie-rock". Its "dissonances and complexities" juxtapose the "sustained with the pointillistic", mirroring the characters' "pensive but restless" wanderings.

== Release ==
An abridged version of the album was released as a DVD with original animated videos directed by James Sumner in August 2006; the DVD omits the songs "Tour Along the Potomac", "Jolly Jolly Jolly Ego", "Drilling Profitably", and "Finches' Song at Oceanic Parking Lot".

In 2010, Dirty Projectors collaborated with Alarm Will Sound to create a live performance version of The Getty Address. The transcription and arrangements for the project were done by Alarm Will Sound members Matt Marks, Alan Pierson and Chris Thompson. The piece was performed by both groups at Lincoln Center, Disney Hall, and the Barbican Centre.

== Critical reception ==
Professional ratings
Review scores
Source	Rating
Pitchfork	8.2/10

The Getty Address has received acclaim from contemporary music critics. Writing for Pitchfork, Jason Crock notes how the album builds upon the classical influences that the group had employed for their previous album, Slaves' Graves and Ballads, by "sampl[ing] [the instrumentation] musique concrète-style and infus[ing] it with electronic R&B beats".

On Consequence of Sound's Top Concept Albums list from 2009, writer Adam Kivel ranked The Getty Address at number one, calling it Longstreth's masterpiece.

== Track listing ==
All tracks are written by David Longstreth.

No.	Title	Length
1.	"I Sit on the Ridge at Dusk"	4:55
2.	"But in the Headlights"	1:50
3.	"Warholian Wigs"	4:32
4.	"I Will Truck"	5:17
5.	"D. Henley's Dream"	4:18
6.	"Gilt Gold Scabs"	5:27
7.	"Ponds & Puddles"	3:50
8.	"Not Having Found"	4:43
9.	"Tour Along the Potomac"	4:13
10.	"Jolly Jolly Jolly Ego"	5:34
11.	"Time Birthed Spilled Blood"	3:03
12.	"Drilling Profitably"	4:29
13.	"Finches' Song at Oceanic Parking Lot"	4:08
Total length:		56:18

- "Time Birthed Spilled Blood" reuses a string figure from "Grandfather's Hanging", from Slaves' Graves and Ballads.

== Personnel ==
Credits are adapted from the album's liner notes.

Dirty Projectors

- David Longstreth (singing the role of Don Henley) – producer, engineer, arrangement, vocals, drums, guitar, 12-string acoustic guitar (2–4, 7), electric guitar (2–4, 7), "beer bottle flutes" (5, 7), "one-man choir" (10, 12)
- Jona Bechtolt – drum programming (4, 8, 9) (Note: Bechtolt was an official member of Dirty Projectors at the time of recording the album, despite his limited contributions to it.)

Additional musicians

- Lucy Greene (singing the role of "Sacagawea Petrillo") – vocals
- "Orchestral Society for the Preservation of the Orchestra" (1, 3–8, 10):
  - Adam Bionarz – performer
  - Ezra Seltzer – performer, cello (4, 11, 12)
  - Hank Miller – performer
  - Yasemin Schatz – performer
  - Sam Bernstein – performer
  - Emily Rostetter – performer
  - Elana Arian – performer
  - Jon Zalben – performer
- "Brown Finch Choir" – vocals (1, 4–6, 8, 11–13)
- Dan Sobo – saxophone (2, 9, 13), clarinet (9)
- Joseph Grimm – trombone (2, 9), trumpet (2, 9)

Production

- John Golden – mastering
