= David Longstreth =

American singer and songwriter (born 1981)

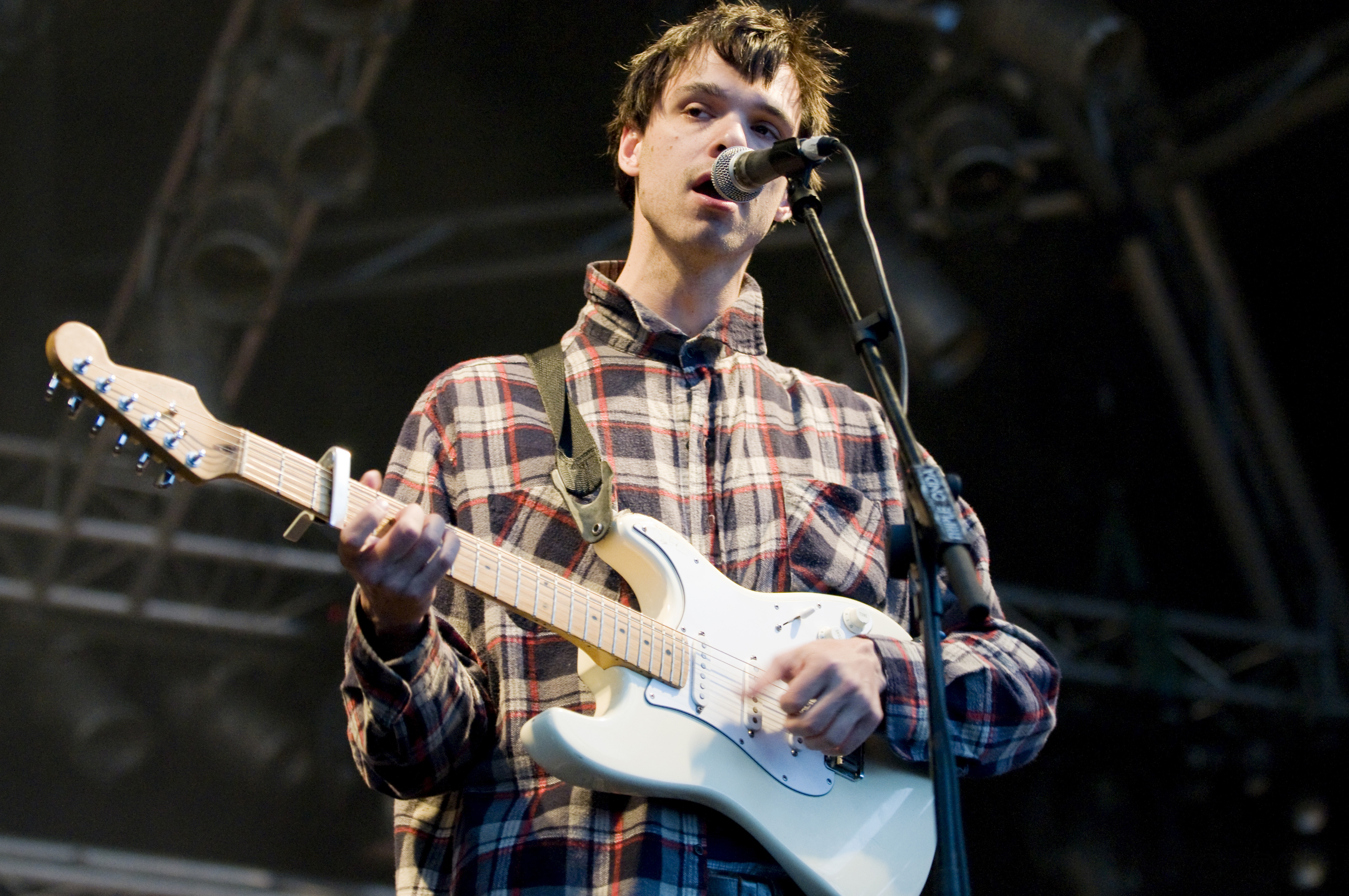
- David Longstreth (2008)

Background information
- Born: December 17, 1981 (age 44); Southbury, Connecticut
- Genres: Indie rock; alternative R&B; art pop
- Occupations: Singer, songwriter
- Instruments: Vocals, guitar
- Years active: 2001–present
- Label: Domino
- Member of: Dirty Projectors

David Longstreth (born December 17, 1981) is an American singer, songwriter, guitarist, and record producer. He is best known as the lead vocalist, guitarist, and primary songwriter of the indie rock band Dirty Projectors, which he has fronted since 2002 and with which he has recorded ten studio albums.

Longstreth composed the score to the 2025 fantasy adventure film The Legend of Ochi, directed by Isaiah Saxon and released by A24. He has collaborated with Solange, Bombino, Björk, and Joanna Newsom, among others, and co-wrote the 2015 single "FourFiveSeconds" by Rihanna, Kanye West, and Paul McCartney.

== Biography ==
Longstreth was born in Southbury, Connecticut. He attended Yale University, majoring in music, before dropping out halfway through his second year. He has said he "rarely ventured out of his dorm room. I found myself completely absorbed in making my own music, though there wasn't really anyone to play it for." Longstreth then moved in with his brother in Portland, Oregon, and worked on his first album, The Graceful Fallen Mango, which he released in 2002. Shortly after completing it, he returned to Yale to finish his degree and began making music under the name "Dirty Projectors". He recorded multiple records under the name while at Yale.

In 2015, he contributed to "FourFiveSeconds", a collaborative song by Rihanna, Kanye West and Paul McCartney. That same year, he composed a classical composition called "Michael Jordan". It was composed for New York group Ensemble LPR. He also contributed to the orchestral arrangement of the song "Time, As a Symptom" on Joanna Newsom's album Divers. In 2016, he produced the album Azel by Nigerien musician Bombino and collaborated on the Solange release A Seat at the Table.

In January 2025, he released a David Berman covers EP.

== Personal life ==
Longstreth is the younger brother of American painter, musician, and internet radio personality Jake Longstreth.
