= Vampire Weekend discography =

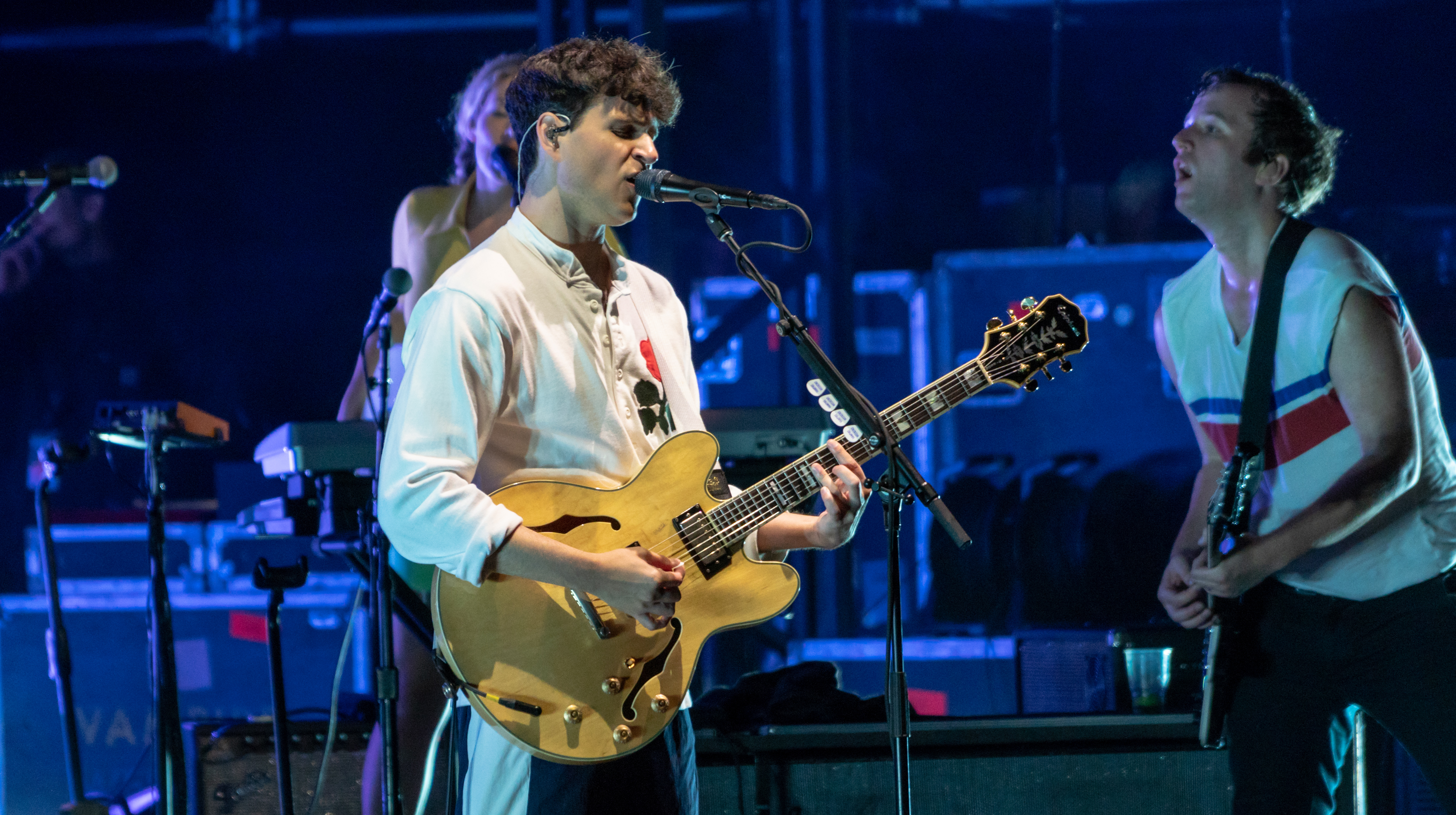
- Vampire Weekend performing at Larmer Tree Gardens in 2018
- Studio albums: 5
- EPs: 4
- Live albums: 3
- Singles: 20
- Music videos: 13

The discography of American indie rock band Vampire Weekend consists of 5 studio albums, 4 extended plays (EPs), 3 live albums, 20 singles, and 13 music videos.

== Albums ==
=== Studio albums ===
List of studio albums, with selected chart positions and certifications.
Title	Details	Peak chart positions										Certifications
Title	Details	US	AUS	BEL	CAN	FRA	GER	IRL	NED	SWE	UK	Certifications
Vampire Weekend	Released: January 29, 2008 (US); Label: XL; Formats: CD, LP, digital download	17	37	37	—	81	85	23	62	44	15	RIAA: Platinum; ARIA: Gold; BPI: Platinum; MC: Gold
Contra	Released: January 11, 2010 (US); Label: XL; Formats: CD, LP, digital download	1	2	8	1	15	15	4	31	14	3	RIAA: Gold; ARIA: Gold; BPI: Gold; MC: Gold
Modern Vampires of the City	Released: May 14, 2013 (US); Label: XL; Formats: CD, LP, digital download	1	7	5	2	18	21	2	20	17	3	RIAA: Gold; BPI: Gold; MC: Gold
Father of the Bride	Released: May 3, 2019 (US); Label: Spring Snow, Columbia; Formats: CD, LP, cassette, digital download	1	8	8	6	38	21	5	11	31	2	RIAA: Gold; BPI: Silver
Only God Was Above Us	Released: April 5, 2024 (US); Label: Columbia; Formats: CD, LP, digital download	27	72	22	—	39	25	21	64	— (Note: Only God Was Above Us did not enter the Sverigetopplistan Albums chart but peaked at number 16 on the Sverigetopplistan Physical Albums chart.)	11	
"—" denotes a recording that did not chart or was not released in that territory.

=== Live albums ===
- Frog on the Bass Drum Vol. 01: Live In Indianapolis, 2023
- Frog on the Bass Drum Vol. 02: Una Notte A Milano, 2024
- Frog on the Bass Drum Vol. 03: Weekend At The Garden, 2025

== Extended plays ==
Title	Details	Peak chart positions	
Title	Details	US	US Rock
Vampire Weekend	Released: 2007 (US); Formats: CD, LP	—	—
iTunes Session	Released: December 21, 2010 (US); Label: XL; Formats: Digital download	171	37
Live in Florida	Released: July 9, 2020 (US); Label: Spring Snow, Columbia; Formats: Digital download	—	—
40:42	Released: February 4, 2021 (US); Label: Spring Snow, Columbia; Formats: Digital download	—	—
"—" denotes a recording that did not chart or was not released in that territory.

== Singles ==
List of singles, with selected chart positions and certifications, showing year released and originating album.
Title	Year	Peak chart positions										Certifications	Album
Title	Year	US Bub.	US Rock	BEL (FL)	BEL (WA)	CAN	FRA	ICE	IRL	JPN	UK	Certifications	Album
"Mansard Roof"	2007	— (Note: "Mansard Roof" did not enter the Billboard Hot 100, but peaked at number 39 on the Hot Singles Sales chart.)	—	—	—	—	—	—	—	—	— (Note: "Mansard Roof" did not enter the UK Singles Chart, but peaked at number 57 on the UK Physical Singles Chart Top 100.)		Vampire Weekend
"A-Punk"	2008	6	— (Note: "A-Punk" did not enter the Hot Rock & Alternative Songs Chart, but peaked at number 25 on the Alternative Airplay chart.)	— (Note: "A-Punk" did not enter the Ultratop 50, but peaked at number 18 on the Flemish Back Catalogue Singles chart.)	—	—	—	—	—	—	55	RIAA: Platinum; BPI: 2× Platinum; MC: Platinum	Vampire Weekend
"Oxford Comma"	2008	— (Note: "Oxford Comma" did not enter the Billboard Hot 100, but peaked at number 35 on the Hot Singles Sales chart.)	—	—	—	—	—	—	—	—	38	BPI: Silver; MC: Gold	Vampire Weekend
"Cape Cod Kwassa Kwassa"	2008	—	—	—	—	—	—	—	—	—	178	RIAA: Gold	Vampire Weekend
"The Kids Don't Stand a Chance"	2008	—	—	—	—	—	—	—	—	—	—		Vampire Weekend
"Horchata"	2009	2	— (Note: "Horchata" did not enter the Hot Rock & Alternative Songs Chart, but peaked at number 19 on the Rock Digital Song Sales chart.)	26	—	69	—	—	—	—	—		Contra
"Cousins"	2009	— (Note: "Cousins" did not enter the Billboard Hot 100, but peaked at number 48 on the Hot Singles Sales chart.)	25	—	—	—	—	—	—	51	39		Contra
"Giving Up the Gun"	2010	—	— (Note: "Giving Up the Gun" did not enter the Hot Rock & Alternative Songs Chart, but peaked at number 42 on the Rock Digital Song Sales chart.)	— (Note: "Giving Up the Gun" did not enter the Flanders Ultratop 50, but peaked at number 15 on the Ultratip chart.)	—	—	—	—	—	—	172		Contra
"Holiday"	2010	25	34	— (Note: "Holiday" did not enter the Flanders Ultratop 50, but peaked at number 5 on the Ultratip chart.)	—	—	—	—	—	—	158		Contra
"White Sky"	2010	— (Note: "White Sky" did not enter the Billboard Hot 100, but peaked at number 22 on the Hot Singles Sales chart.)	—	— (Note: "White Sky" did not enter the Flanders Ultratop 50, but peaked at number 16 on the Ultratip chart.)	— (Note: "White Sky" did not enter the Wallonie Ultratop 50, but peaked at number 32 on the Ultratip chart.)	—	60	—	—	—	78		Contra
"Run"	2010	—	—	—	—	—	—	—	—	—	—		Contra
"Diane Young" / "Step"	2013	19	17	—	—	—	—	—	76	37	50	RIAA: Gold; MC: Gold	Modern Vampires of the City
"Diane Young" / "Step"	2013	—	— (Note: "Step" did not enter the Hot Rock & Alternative Songs Chart, but peaked at number 35 on the Alternative Airplay chart.)	— (Note: "Step" did not enter the Flanders Ultratop 50, but peaked at number 4 on the Ultratip chart.)	—	—	170	—	—	—	142	MC: Gold	Modern Vampires of the City
"Ya Hey"	2013	—	—	—	—	—	—	—	—	—	—		Modern Vampires of the City
"Unbelievers"	2013	— (Note: "Unbelievers" did not enter the Billboard Hot 100, but peaked at number 23 on the Hot Singles Sales chart.)	22	— (Note: "Unbelievers" did not enter the Flanders Ultratop 50, but peaked at number 20 on the Ultratip chart.)	—	—	—	—	—	—	158	MC: Gold	Modern Vampires of the City
"Harmony Hall" / "2021"	2019	—	5	50	45	—	—	20	—	—	— (Note: "Harmony Hall" did not enter the UK Singles Chart, but peaked at number 58 on the UK Singles Sales Chart.)	RIAA: Gold; BPI: Silver	Father of the Bride
"Harmony Hall" / "2021"	2019	—	38	—	—	—	—	—	—	— (Note: "2021" did not enter the Billboard Japan Hot 100 chart, but peaked at number 69 on the Oricon Singles Chart.)	—		Father of the Bride
"Sunflower" (featuring Steve Lacy) / "Big Blue"	2019	—	24	— (Note: "Sunflower" did not enter the Flanders Ultratop 50, but charted as an "extra tip" on the Ultratip chart.)	—	—	—	—	—	—	—		Father of the Bride
"Sunflower" (featuring Steve Lacy) / "Big Blue"	2019	—	33	—	—	—	—	—	—	—	—		Father of the Bride
"This Life" / "Unbearably White"	2019	—	11	— (Note: "This Life" did not enter the Flanders Ultratop 50, but peaked at number 15 on the Ultratip chart.)	— (Note: "This Life" did not enter the Wallonie Ultratop 50, but peaked at number 20 on the Ultratip chart.)	—	—	13	—	—	89	RIAA: Gold; BPI: Silver	Father of the Bride
"This Life" / "Unbearably White"	2019	—	23	—	—	—	—	—	—	—	—		Father of the Bride
"Capricorn" / "Gen-X Cops"	2024	—	41	—	—	—	—	—	—	—	—		Only God Was Above Us
"Capricorn" / "Gen-X Cops"	2024	—	—	—	—	—	—	—	—	—	—		Only God Was Above Us
"Classical"	2024	—	— (Note: "Classical" did not enter the Hot Rock & Alternative Songs Chart, but peaked at number 13 on the Adult Alternative Airplay chart.)	—	—	—	—	—	—	— (Note: "Classical" did not enter the Billboard Japan Hot 100 chart, but peaked at number 9 on the Billboard Japan Hot Overseas chart.)	—		Only God Was Above Us
"Mary Boone"	2024	—	—	—	—	—	—	—	—	—	—		Only God Was Above Us
"—" denotes a recording that did not chart or was not released in that territory.

== Other charted and certified songs ==
List of songs, with selected chart positions and certifications, showing year released and originating album.
Title	Year	Peak chart positions	Certifications	Album
Title	Year	US Rock	Certifications	Album
"Campus"	2008	—	MC: Gold	Vampire Weekend
"Hold You Now" (featuring Danielle Haim)	2019	21		Father of the Bride
"Bambina"	2019	24		Father of the Bride
"How Long?"	2019	30		Father of the Bride
"Rich Man"	2019	34		Father of the Bride
"Married in a Gold Rush" (featuring Danielle Haim)	2019	41		Father of the Bride
"My Mistake"	2019	47		Father of the Bride
"Sympathy"	2019	23		Father of the Bride
"—" denotes a recording that did not chart or was not released in that territory.

== Other appearances ==
Title	Year	Album
"Exit Music (For a Film)"	2007	OKX: A Tribute to OK Computer
"Jonathan Low"	2010	The Twilight Saga: Eclipse - Soundtrack
"I'm Going Down"	2014	Girls Volume 2: All Adventurous Women Do...

== Music videos ==
List of music videos, showing year released and directors.
Title	Year	Director
"Mansard Roof"	2007	Alexis Boling
"A-Punk"	2008	Garth Jennings
"Oxford Comma"	2008	Richard Ayoade
"Cape Cod Kwassa Kwassa"	2008	Richard Ayoade
"Cousins"	2009	Garth Jennings
"Giving Up the Gun"	2010	The Malloys
"Holiday"	2010	The Malloys
"Diane Young"	2013	Primo Kahn
"Harmony Hall"	2019	Emmett Malloy
"Sunflower" (featuring Steve Lacy)	2019	Jonah Hill
"This Life"	2019	Emmett Malloy
"Capricorn"	2024	Nick Harwood
"Sympathy"	2025	Ricky Ubeda
