= Campus (disambiguation) =

A campus is the land on which an institution, either academic or non-academic, is located.

Campus may also refer to:

- Campus (anime)
- Campus (college), a private community college in Sacrament, California
- CAMPUS (database), a database of plastics properties
- Campus (film), an Indian film
- Campus (train), an American passenger train
- Campus (TV series), a British sitcom television series
- Campus novel, a genre of novel
- Campus Party, a kind of LAN party
- Campus radio, a radio station run by students of an educational institution
- Campus Station (OC Transpo), a transit station in Ottawa, Canada
- Campus university, a type of university in Britain
- DWRT-FM, an FM-radio station in the Philippines, formerly known as "Campus 99.5"
- Virtual campus, the online offerings of a college or university
- Campus notebook, a notebook of Kokuyo brand in Japan and other Asian countries
- Campus, a song by American rock band Vampire Weekend.
- a climbing move, see Glossary of climbing terms
- "Campus", the eighth expansion park for the city building game Cities: Skylines

== Places ==
- Campus, Illinois, a village in the United States
- Campus, West Virginia
- Campus Bay
- Campus Geesseknäppchen, Luxembourg

== People with the surname ==
- Filomena Campus, jazz singer, composer, lyricist and theatre director
- Peter Campus (born 1937), American video artist
