= The Campus =

The Campus may refer to:

- The Campus (CCNY), the oldest student-run newspaper within the CUNY system
- The Campus (TV series), a Ugandan television series

== See also ==
- Campus (disambiguation)
