= Boling =

Boling may refer to:

== People with the surname ==
- Zhang Boling
- Alexis Boling (born 1979), American filmmaker and musician
- Bodine Boling (born 1982), American writer and filmmaker
- Clint Boling (born 1989), American football player
- Dulcie Boling (born 1936), Australian businesswoman
- John Boling (1895–1962), American racing driver
- Lexi Boling (born 1993), American model
- Matt Boling (born 2000), American track and field athlete
- Kim Böling (born 1992), Finnish footballer

== Places ==
- Boling County, a former county of the Eastern Han in Hebei, China
- Boling Principality, a former principality of the Western Jin Empire in Hebei, China
- Boling Commandery, a former medieval commandery with its seat variously at Raoyang, Anping, and Dingzhou in Hebei, China
- Boling, a census-designated place in Wharton County, Texas, United States

== See also ==
- Boling-Boling Festival
- Cui clan of Boling
