= Lord Ullin's Daughter =

Lord Ullin's Daughter may refer to:

- a poem by Thomas Campbell (1777–1844)
- the same poem performed on the 2019 album Father of the Bride by Vampire Weekend
