= Cape Cod Kwassa Kwassa =

Single by Vampire Weekend

from the album Vampire Weekend
- Released: August 18, 2008
- Genre: Indie pop, calypso, worldbeat
- Length: 3:34
- Label: XL
- Composer: Vampire Weekend
- Lyricist: Ezra Koenig
- Producer: Rostam Batmanglij

Vampire Weekend singles chronology
"Oxford Comma" (2008)	"Cape Cod Kwassa Kwassa" (2008)	"The Kids Don't Stand a Chance" (2008)

Music video
- "Cape Cod Kwassa Kwassa" on YouTube

"Cape Cod Kwassa Kwassa" is the fourth single by indie rock band Vampire Weekend, released 18 August 2008. The song was rated 67th best song of 2008 by Rolling Stone magazine.

== Background ==
In 2005, Vampire Weekend vocalist Ezra Koenig travelled through London en route to India and said that the trip got him "thinking a lot about colonialism and the aesthetic connections between preppy culture and the native cultures of places like Africa and India." This inspired Koenig to write a short story exploring those connections, and called it "Cape Cod Kwassa Kwassa", after which the song was named. "Kwassa kwassa" refers to a dance from Congo (DRC).

== Music video ==
The video, directed by British comedian Richard Ayoade (who had also directed the band's video for "Oxford Comma") and set in the 1980s, was filmed in Spring Lake, New Jersey at Kaitlin Files' shore house. It is the first video where Vampire Weekend consciously decided to use a narrative with the band becoming characters, unlike previous videos which were "fairly abstract [with] no narrative." Koenig said he felt there was "a Tim Burton element" to the video, in which the band reinvented their image as goths, "with white faces, spiked hair and black outfits." The characters were created in 2007 by Koenig, who came up with rough ideas and images, and was helped by Ayoade to create a story from them. A goth girl, Jenny Murray, seeks to convert her boyfriend, Koenig, into a goth boy.

Bass guitarist Chris Baio said that the band devotes a lot of time to touring, so "when [they] do something different like this, it is an exciting thing." Keyboardist Rostam Batmanglij said that the band is "interested in visuals, and it's a treat for [them] to get to do this."

== Cover versions ==
In 2008, Peter Gabriel collaborated with Hot Chip on a cover of the song. Vampire Weekend themselves had reportedly asked Gabriel to cover it, on account of him being referenced in the lyrics ("This feels so unnatural/Peter Gabriel, too"). Ahead of the cover's release, Gabriel told 6Music that he hadn't decided whether or not to sing the line that references him verbatim. He ended up replacing one of the lines with "And it feels so unnatural/To sing your own name" when the cover was released.

"Richard Russell [head of XL Recordings] is a dad at my son's school," Gabriel explained to Mark Blake, "and he said, 'I have this young band and they are mentioning you as an influence.' …I could hear a lot of Talking Heads in there… When they wanted to involve me in this remix, I didn't know if it was a bit too weird to sing my own name, so I changed it. But I think Vampire Weekend are very smart songwriters."

Lykke Li and Chromeo have also both covered the song live: the former at a series of shows between 2008 and 2009, and the latter at the 2015 Governors Ball, where they were joined on-stage by Koenig himself.

== Critical reception ==
MusicOMH commented that the beginning of "Cape Cod Kwassa Kwassa" sounds "as if imitating 1950s calypso" and described the opening hook as having "innocence [that] adds charm to the track, built on by the breezy vocal." Pitchfork Media said that the song's "instrumentation and bubbly beat evoke Paul Simon's Graceland and "transforms the buoyant spirit of "Diamonds on the Soles of Her Shoes" to a cheaply (but cleanly) recorded, stripped-down, no-fuss context." Pitchfork also said that "the unassuming nature of the production works in Vampire Weekend's favor, allowing subtle pleasures like that sunny falsetto vocalese at the end and the purity of the guitar tone to shine through."

== Track list ==
Digital Download (iTunes):

1. "Cape Cod Kwassa Kwassa" (radio edit) – 3:32
2. "Cape Cod Kwassa Kwassa" (The Very Best remix) – 3:26

Digital Download (Rhapsody):

1. "Cape Cod Kwassa Kwassa" (live) – 3:35

== Personnel ==
Vampire Weekend

- Ezra Koenig
- Rostam Batmanglij
- Christopher Tomson
- Chris Baio

Additional musicians

- Jeff Curtin – hand drums, shaker

Technical

- Emily Lazar – mastering
- Rostam Batmanglij – mixing

== Chart positions ==
Following the success of "A-Punk" and "Oxford Comma," Vampire Weekend decided to release "Cape Cod Kwassa Kwassa" as the fourth single from the album. Originally released in 2008, the song failed to make much of an impact on the UK Singles Chart, peaking at #178. The single was not released in America, meaning along with "Mansard Roof," the single was rather unsuccessful. Despite this, the single was eventually certified gold by the RIAA on June 18, 2025.

Chart (2008)	Peak position
UK Singles Chart	178

== Certifications ==
Region	Certification	Certified units/sales
United States (RIAA)	Gold	500,000^{‡}
^{‡} Sales+streaming figures based on certification alone.
