= Movement and Location =

- Film poster
- Directed by: Alexis Boling
- Written by: Bodine Boling
- Story by: Bodine Boling; Kara Strait
- Produced by: Serena Hedison
- Starring: Bodine Boling; Catherine Missal; Brendan Griffin; David Andrew Macdonald
- Cinematography: Alexis Boling
- Edited by: Bodine Boling
- Music by: Dan Tepfer
- Release date: May 2014
- Running time: 93 minutes
- Country: United States
- Language: English

Movement and Location (also called Movement + Location) is an American science fiction movie set in modern-day Brooklyn, directed by Alexis Boling. It stars Bodine Boling, Catherine Missal, Brendan Griffin, Anna Margaret Hollyman, David Andrew Macdonald and John Dapolito. Movement and Location tells the story of Kim Getty, an immigrant from 400 years in the future who is sent back in time to live an easier life. It premiered at the 2014 Brooklyn Film Festival where it won the Audience Award, Best Screenplay and Best Original Score.

== Plot summary ==
Kim Getty is an immigrant from 400 years in the future, who has traveled back in time to live out an easier life. It turns out to be an isolating, one-way trip, but in the three years since her arrival Kim has built a life that she is almost satisfied with. She has a job, an apartment with a roommate, and is beginning to fall in love.

But when she encounters a teenage girl who is also from the future, Kim's remade sense of self is put to the test. The girl leads Kim to her long-lost husband, now 20 years older than her and maladjusted to contemporary society, and Kim's carefully reinvented identity starts to unravel.

Kim finds herself needing to choose between two completely different lives, but as her secrets are exposed, the real decision is what she is willing to do to survive.

== Production ==
Movement and Location was filmed over 18 days, predominantly in Brooklyn. Local filming locations included Prospect Park, the Promenade in Brooklyn Heights, and Ft. Greene boutique Thistle & Clover. One filming location burned down shortly after filming took place. Bodine Boling said that if the fire had happened two weeks earlier, the movie would have been put on indefinite hold.

Movement and Location was the first film that used crowdfunding website Seed and Spark to premiere at a festival.

== Music ==
Dan Tepfer composed Movement and Location's score. The film also features original song "Don't Skip a Beat" by Imani Coppola.

== Reception ==
As the British Film Institute's Sight & Sound international film magazine describes, "The drama that emerges from these broken, fugitive lives is as an allegory of exile, immigration and assimilation, while defamiliarising the things (food, water, space) that we take for granted in our own times."

This Week In New York praised the film upon its release, asserting, "Despite its sci-fi plot, Movement and Location is a gently paced, well-acted, and honest depiction of relationships and responsibility in modern-day Brooklyn."

== Festivals and awards ==
Festival	Recognition & Awards	Year
Brooklyn Film Festival	Audience Award, Best Screenplay, Best Original Score	2014
Indie Memphis Film Festival	Excellence in Filmmaking, Best Poster	2014
The Rome International Film Festival	Best Narrative Feature, Audience Award	2014
Alhambra Theatre Film Festival	Best Actress	2015
Chesapeake Film Festival		2014
Woods Hole Film Festival		2014
Atlanta Film Festival		2015
Sci-Fi-London Film Festival		2015
