= Oxford Comma (song) =

Single by Vampire Weekend

from the album Vampire Weekend
- Released: May 26, 2008
- Recorded: 2007
- Genre: Indie pop
- Length: 3:15
- Label: XL
- Composer: Vampire Weekend
- Lyricist: Ezra Koenig
- Producer: Rostam Batmanglij

Vampire Weekend singles chronology
"A-Punk" (2008)	"Oxford Comma" (2008)	"Cape Cod Kwassa Kwassa" (2008)

Music video
- "Oxford Comma" on YouTube

"Oxford Comma" is the third single by Vampire Weekend released May 26, 2008, from their debut album Vampire Weekend.

== Song title and meaning ==
On January 28, 2008, Michael Hogan of Vanity Fair interviewed Ezra Koenig regarding the title of the song and its relevance to the song's meaning. Koenig said he first encountered the Oxford comma, a comma used before the conjunction at the end of a list, on Facebook and learned of a Columbia University Facebook group called Students for the Preservation of the Oxford Comma. Several months later, while sitting at a piano in his parents' house, he began to write the song and later said, "the first thing that came out was 'Who gives a fuck about an Oxford comma?'" He stated that the song "is more about not giving a fuck than about Oxford commas."

The song's lyrics contain multiple references to rapper Lil Jon (claiming that "he always tells the truth"). Lil Jon sent Vampire Weekend a case of crunk juice as thanks for the name check, and a friendship formed between Vampire Weekend and Lil Jon that would pan out into Lil Jon's cameo in the music video for "Giving Up the Gun". Also mentioned is the city of Dharamsala, the city in exile home of the 14th Dalai Lama ("the highest lama"), the current Dalai Lama.

== Music video ==
The video, directed by comedian Richard Ayoade, premiered June 20, 2008, on FNMTV. The concept behind the video was for it to be filmed in one long take—similar to the band's video for previous single "A-Punk"—with unified visual and musical aspects. The video drew heavily on impressions of the works of American filmmaker Wes Anderson. According to Koenig, "It's nice that now we're at a point where we have more resources and we can talk to the director."

== Critical reception ==
Pitchfork Media writer Mark Richardson praised "Oxford Comma" as "damn catchy", while Andrew Grillo of Click Music described it as having a "woozy organ and a half arsed guitar solo that masterfully straddles the line between inept and charmingly unstudied." He elaborated that the afro-beat influence was less evident and finished his review by saying that the song was an "extremely enjoyable ditty that goes some way to justifying the attention they've received over the past year."

In 2010, musician Robert Forster described "Oxford Comma" as the "best song of the last five years".

== Track listing ==
1. "Oxford Comma"
2. "Walcott" (Insane Mix)

== Personnel ==
Vampire Weekend

- Ezra Koenig
- Rostam Batmanglij
- Christopher Tomson
- Chris Baio

Additional musicians

- Jeff Curtin – hand drums, shaker

== Chart performance ==
Released in May 2008, "Oxford Comma" began to climb the UK Singles Chart. To date, the single's peak is at #38, which is Vampire Weekend's highest-charting single.

Chart (2008)	Peak position
UK Singles Chart	38

== Certifications ==
Region	Certification	Certified units/sales
Canada (Music Canada)	Gold	40,000^{‡}
United Kingdom (BPI)	Silver	200,000^{‡}
^{‡} Sales+streaming figures based on certification alone.

== In other media ==
"Oxford Comma" was featured in the first episode of the fifth season of How I Met Your Mother, "Definitions," the first episode of the UK show Pramface, and The Chair.
