= Filomena Campus =

Italian singer, composer, academic and director

- Born: Sardinia, Italy
- Education: University of Cagliari; Goldsmiths, University of London
- Occupations: Jazz singer, composer, lyricist, academic and theatre director
- Known for: Founder of Theatralia
- Website: filomenacampus.me

Filomena Campus is a jazz singer, composer, lyricist, academic, theatre director, and radio presenter, who was born in Sardinia and since 2001 has been based in London, England. Her performance style characteristically fuses jazz, theatre and literature, and she is the founder of the company Theatralia, curating the annual Theatralia Jazz Festival in collaboration with the PizzaExpress Jazz Club in Soho, with the aim of uniting British and Italian styles. On December 14th, 2023, Campus was awarded the honour of “Cavaliera” (Dame) of the Order of Merit of the Italian Republic.

== Career ==
Filomena Campus was born on the Italian island of Sardinia. She earned a degree in English literature from the University of Cagliari, where as a student she started singing and performing. In Cagliari, she performed and directed A Game of Chess, a project inspired by the work of Samuel Beckett, James Joyce and T. S. Eliot that was her first experiment in combining live jazz with theatre, in 2001. That year, she relocated to England to study for a Master's degree in theatre directing at Goldsmiths, University of London.

In 2003, she founded the company Theatralia, described as "an international collective of performers and artists whose works combine literature, physical theatre, performance art, digital art with live music and audience participation".

She has performed as a vocalist with leading musicians, including Orphy Robinson, Huw Warren, Byron Wallen, Cleveland Watkiss, Jean Toussaint, Maggie Nicols, Kenny Wheeler, Paolo Fresu, Evan Parker, Guy Barker, Laura Cole, Antonello Salis, Gavino Murgia, Jackie Walduck, and Tony Kofi, and has appeared at several international festivals, as well as on radio. Her voice has been described as having a "huge range of truly improvised vocal sounds", and Cleveland Watkiss has called her "one of the most adventurous young female singers/performers/composers based in the UK".

She has also taught and lectured in theatre, acting, directing, improvisation, voice and related studies at educational institutions such as Central School of Speech and Drama, Drama Studio London, East 15 Acting School, University of Essex, Kingston University, and Buckinghamshire New University.

In 2009, Campus was awarded the Italian Premio Maria Carta and in 2015 the Premio Navicella.

In 2010 she formed the Filomena Campus Quartet, with Steve Lodder on piano, Dudley Phillips on bass and Rod Youngs on drums, with projects including Jester of Jazz (featuring Jean Toussaint and Rowland Sutherland on a 2011 recording), and Italy VS England with Italian writer Stefano Benni.

In 2014 she released the album Scaramouche (2014) with Giorgio Serci (with special guest Kenny Wheeler).

The Filomena Campus Quartet, featuring Charlie Pyne on double bass, released the album THEATRALIA (33Jazz Records) in 2026.

In addition to her show on London One Radio interviewing artists, in 2022 that Campus joined Jazz London Radio for her new show Filomena Campus' Theatralia Jazz, airing on Fridays at 5pm and Sundays at 3pm.

=== Theatralia Jazz Festival ===
In 2013, Campus founded the Theatralia Jazz Festival – which was originally known as "My Jazz Islands" – which brings together music and theatre from British and Italian musicians and writers, with the production Italy VS England produced in both Cagliari and London. In 2018 the theme of the festival was "Sardinian Extravaganza", a jazz bridge with the town of Alghero in Sardinia. In 2019 and 2020 the bridge was going to be between London and Rome, but the pandemic stopped the project. She has said: "Years ago I left my island for another island, that welcomed me and helped me to make many dreams come true. In a moment where everyone seems to draw up walls, I aim to build a bridge between our two countries. A bridge made of jazz notes, theatre and masks, musical encounters enriched by the magic words of great poetry."

=== Monk Misterioso ===
Campus adapted and directed Stefano Benni's Misterioso, A Journey into the Silence of Thelonious Monk (2005) as a theatre production featuring the music of Thelonious Monk, staging the show at the Edinburgh Festival in 2008, the Riverside Studios in 2009, and at a variety of venues in the following years, including as part of the Theatralia Jazz Festival.

In 2017 an Arts Council England-sponsored international Monk Misterioso Tour was launched at the British Library in October, culminating with a new dramatised production of Misterioso: A Journey into the Silence of Thelonious Monk at Kings Place that closed the London Jazz Festival's celebration of the centenary of Monk's birth, and featured Campus alongside Cleveland Watkiss, Pat Thomas, Rowland Sutherland, Orphy Robinson, Dudley Phillips and Mark Mondesir. Reviewing this sold-out performance for Jazz in Europe, Erminia Yardley wrote: "With a mixture of theatrical panache and sheer talent, they all produced a show that raised the bar. The beauty and innovation of the production filled every note and words spoken and sung on the night. Brilliant!"

== Academic research ==
Campus earned her PhD from the Royal Central School of Speech and Drama,University of London, in 2026, supported by an Arts and Humanities Research Council (AHRC) scholarship through the London Arts and Humanities Partnership (LAHP). Her doctoral research examines Italian theatre maker Franca Rame's artistic practices and feminist theatre-making.
