= 2021 (song) =

Single by Vampire Weekend

from the album Father of the Bride
- A-side: "Harmony Hall"
- Released: January 24, 2019
- Length: 1:38
- Label: Spring Snow; Columbia
- Composers: Haruomi Hosono; Ezra Koenig; Ariel Rechtshaid
- Producers: Ariel Rechtshaid; Ezra Koenig

Vampire Weekend singles chronology
| "Unbelievers" (2013) | "Harmony Hall" / "2021" (2019) | "Sunflower" / "Big Blue" (2019) |

Audio video
- "2021" on YouTube

"2021" is a song by American indie pop band Vampire Weekend. Alongside "Harmony Hall", it served as the double A-side lead single for their fourth studio album Father of the Bride, and was released on January 24, 2019, by Columbia Records. "2021" was later re-released on December 22, 2021, as a collaboration 12" single alongside "Talking" by Haruomi Hosono.

== Composition ==
The "sparse lovelorn ballad" is built around a sample of the ambient track "Talking", composed in the 1980s by Haruomi Hosono for Japanese retail company Muji. It features a soft pulsing synth and fingerpicked guitars, along with a distorted vocal sample of the word "boy" sung by Jenny Lewis.

== Personnel ==
Credits adapted from Qobuz.

Musicians

- Ezra Koenig – vocals, guitar
- Jenny Lewis – additional vocals
- Ariel Rechtshaid – programming, synthesizer, bass guitar

Engineers

- Ariel Rechtshaid – engineering, mixing
- Chris Kasych – engineering
- John DeBold – engineering
- Ezra Koenig – mixing
- Chris Allgood – assistant engineering
- Emily Lazar – mastering

== Charts ==
| Chart (2019) | Peak position |
|---|---|
| US Hot Rock & Alternative Songs (Billboard) | 38 |
| Chart (2021) | Peak position |
| Japan (Oricon) | 69 |
