= Harmony Hall (song) =

2019 single by Vampire Weekend

Single by Vampire Weekend

from the album Father of the Bride
- A-side: "2021"
- Released: January 24, 2019
- Genre: Indie pop; country-soul
- Length: 5:08
- Label: Spring Snow; Columbia
- Songwriter: Ezra Koenig
- Producers: Ariel Rechtshaid; Ezra Koenig; Rostam Batmanglij (add.)

Vampire Weekend singles chronology
"Unbelievers" (2013)	"Harmony Hall" / "2021" (2019)	"Sunflower" / "Big Blue" (2019)

Audio sample
- file; help

Music video
- "Harmony Hall" on YouTube

"Harmony Hall" is a song by American indie pop band Vampire Weekend. It is the lead single from their fourth studio album, Father of the Bride, and was released on January 24, 2019, by Columbia Records as a double A-side with "2021". It is the band's highest-charting single on the U.S. Alternative Songs and Hot Rock Songs charts, peaking at No. 8 and No. 5, respectively. It also received a nomination for Best Rock Song at the 62nd Annual Grammy Awards.

== Music and lyrics ==
The "rolling country-soul" and indie pop of "Harmony Hall" has been compared to the Grateful Dead, specifically their song "Touch of Grey". The song's release saw the band once again receive comparisons to the music of Paul Simon. The track's piano groove, percussion, and breakbeats are influenced by British baggy, rave, and Madchester music from the 1990s, such as "Unbelievable" by EMF, while the piano and strings in the bridge exhibit a Baroque style.

The song's lyrics present a feeling of dread, contrasted against its upbeat sound. The song's chorus features the lyric "Anybody with a worried mind could never forgive the sight/Of wicked snakes inside a place you thought was dignified." The single's artwork features a snake. The chorus also features the lyric "I don’t wanna live like this, but I don't wanna die," an interpolation of the same lyric from Vampire Weekend's song "Finger Back" from their third album, Modern Vampires of the City.

== Title ==
The song shares the name of an undergraduate dormitory at Columbia University, where Vampire Weekend formed. Frontman Ezra Koenig has, however, said that the title is not a reference to the dormitory. The title has also been interpreted as a synonym for "echo chamber".

== Critical reception ==
Jeremy D. Larson of Pitchfork described the song as "buoyant, filled with the kind of sunlit energy created when throwing open the shutters," but described its similarity to "Touch of Grey" as "a bit out of step". Will Richards of DIY praised the new upbeat sound, saying, "Of all the experimentation five and a half years could've brought for Vampire Weekend, 'Harmony Hall' simply sees them refining, expanding their palate subtly and gorgeously." Raisa Bruner of Time called the song "sweet and nimble" and said its "rich guitar and piano riffing" would please longtime fans.

== Music video ==
A music video for the song was released on February 20, 2019. It features Koenig preparing pancake art using a spirograph, and cutaways featuring a green tree python slithering around a kitchen, the band performing in front of pyrotechnics, and cameo appearances from Jonah Hill, Ariel Rechtshaid, Dev Hynes, and Danielle Haim. It was directed by Emmett Malloy, who previously directed videos for the band's singles "Giving Up the Gun" and "Holiday".

== Personnel ==
Credits adapted from Qobuz and Tidal.

Musicians

- Ezra Koenig – vocals, acoustic guitar, piano
- Chris Baio – background vocals
- Danielle Haim – vocals
- Tommy King – piano
- Greg Leisz – electric guitar, steel guitar
- David Longstreth – electric guitar, vocals
- Benji Lysaght – guitar
- Justin Meldal-Johnsen – bass guitar
- Garrett Ray – drums
- Buddy Ross – keyboards, synthesizer
- Ariel Rechtshaid – bass guitar, percussion, programming, synthesizer, background vocals
- Chris Tomson – background vocals

Engineers

- Ariel Rechtshaid – recording
- Dave Schiffman – recording
- John DeBold – recording
- Chris Kasych – recording
- Manny Marroquin – mixing
- Chris Galland – engineering
- Chris Allgood – assistant engineering
- Robin Florent – assistant engineering
- Scott Desmarais – assistant engineering
- Emily Lazar – mastering

== Charts ==
=== Weekly charts ===
Weekly chart performance
Chart (2019)	Peak position
Belgium (Ultratop 50 Flanders)	50
Belgium (Ultratop 50 Wallonia)	45
Canada Rock (Billboard)	19
China Airplay/FL (Billboard)	42
Iceland (Tónlistinn)	20
New Zealand Hot Singles (RMNZ)	25
Scottish Singles Sales (Official Charts)	63
Switzerland Airplay (Schweizer Hitparade)	73
UK Singles Downloads (Official Charts)	62
US Adult Alternative Airplay (Billboard)	1
US Alternative Airplay (Billboard)	8
US Rock & Alternative Airplay (Billboard)	7
US Hot Rock & Alternative Songs (Billboard)	5

=== Year-end charts ===
Year-end chart performance
Chart (2019)	Peak position
Tokyo (Tokio Hot 100)	71
US Adult Alternative Songs (Billboard)	6
US Alternative Songs (Billboard)	39
US Hot Rock Songs (Billboard)	35
US Rock Airplay Songs (Billboard)	33

=== All-time charts ===
All-time chart performance
Chart	Position
Greatest of All Time Adult Alternative Songs (Billboard)	99

== Certifications ==
Region	Certification	Certified units/sales
United Kingdom (BPI)	Silver	200,000^{‡}
United States (RIAA)	Gold	500,000^{‡}
^{‡} Sales+streaming figures based on certification alone.
