= Sunflower (Vampire Weekend song) =

2019 single by Vampire Weekend

Single by Vampire Weekend featuring Steve Lacy

from the album Father of the Bride
- A-side: "Big Blue"
- Released: March 6, 2019
- Genre: Psychedelic soul; jam rock; jazz-funk
- Length: 2:18
- Label: Spring Snow; Columbia
- Songwriter: Ezra Koenig
- Producers: Ariel Rechtshaid; Ezra Koenig

Vampire Weekend singles chronology
"Harmony Hall" / "2021" (2019)	"Sunflower" / "Big Blue" (2019)	"This Life" / "Unbearably White" (2019)

Steve Lacy singles chronology
"Just a Stranger" (2018)	"Sunflower" (2019)	"N Side" (2019)

Audio sample
- file; help

Music video
- "Sunflower" on YouTube

"Sunflower" is a song by American indie pop band Vampire Weekend featuring singer and guitarist Steve Lacy. It was the second single from their fourth studio album Father of the Bride, and was released on March 6, 2019 by Columbia Records as a double A-side with "Big Blue". In response to Post Malone and Swae Lee's identically-titled single, the band covered the song as a part of their BBC Live Lounge session.

== Composition ==
The track has been characterised as psych-soul, jam rock and jazz-funk. Of the song's composition, Michelle Kim of Pitchfork stated, "Koenig’s love for the Dead and Phish is obvious in the proggy bass scales that open the track, the frantically curling guitar licks, and even… the harmonized scatting that’s done in unison with the instruments. It’s kind of like Stevie Wonder’s "Sir Duke" by way of Guster."

== Critical reception ==
Upon release, Will Hermes of Rolling Stone called Sunflower, "Perhaps the best, and certainly the most weirdly-grooving of the four tracks Vampire Weekend have trickled out in advance of their forthcoming Father of the Bride LP".

== Music video ==
A music video for the song was released on March 13, 2019. It was directed by Jonah Hill, who had previously appeared in the video for "Harmony Hall". It was filmed at Zabar's and Barney Greengrass on the Upper West Side, Manhattan and features a cameo appearance from artist Fab 5 Freddy and comedian Jerry Seinfeld.

== Personnel ==
Credits adapted from Father of the Bride's liner notes.

- Ariel Rechtshaid – engineering, mixing
- Chris Kasych – engineering
- Dave Schiffman – engineering
- John DeBold – engineering
- Hiroya Takayama – engineering
- Takemasa Kosaka – engineering
- Emily Lazar – mastering
- Chris Allgood – mastering assistance

== Charts ==
Chart (2019)	Peak position
US Hot Rock & Alternative Songs (Billboard)	24
