= CAMPUS (database) =

- Website type: Material database for plastics
- Available in: English, French, German, Spanish, Italian, Japanese, Chinese, Korean
- Owner: CWFG mbH
- Website: www.campusplastics.com
- Launched: 1988

CAMPUS (acronym for Computer Aided Material Preselection by Uniform Standards) is a multilingual database for the properties of plastics. It is considered worldwide as a leader in regard to the level of standardization and therefore, ease of comparison, of plastics properties. It also supports diagrams to a large extent. CAMPUS is based on ISO standards 10350, for single-point value e.g. the density, and 11403, for diagrams, e.g. the Stress–strain curve.

== History ==
=== Standardization ===
In the 1980s, the European market for thermoplastics compounds was extremely confusing. On one hand, the number of supplied grades went up from 5,000 to 10,000, while on the other hand, more than 2,500 technical specifications were published alone by the German DIN that were dealing with plastics in general. Moreover, the citation of a testing standard alone was not sufficient, to exactly specify a test method let alone the question of sample preparation. Within the same period, personal computers became more widely available and were also used to collect plastics data. Many users, molders and material suppliers did that in parallel and completely independently, some using different scales of measurement. Therefore, the question arose how to compare such data.

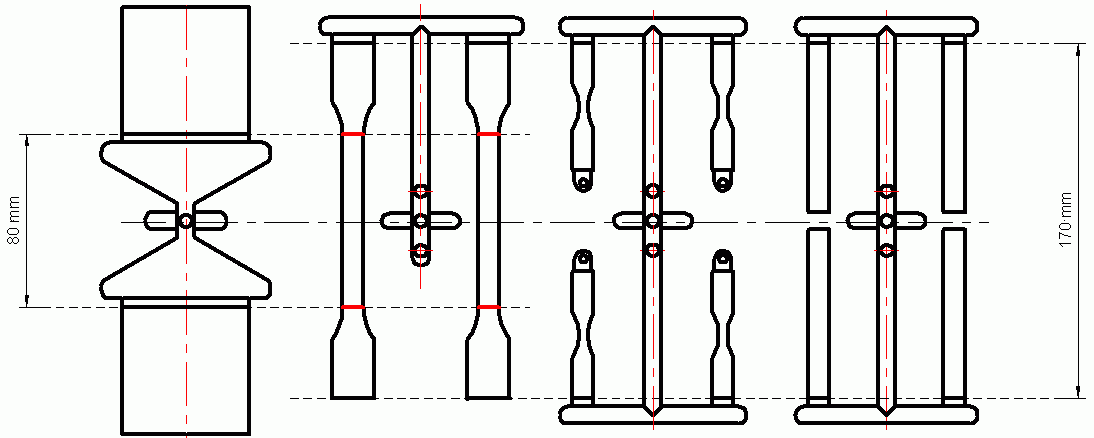
Preferred sample geometry in CAMPUS

For all these reasons, a DIN committee (DIN-Fachnormkreis) began in 1984 to create a list of preferred test methods for plastics testing (the so-called Grundwertekatalog, "Ground-values-catalog")) which should fulfill the following constrictions:

- definition of sample preparation procedures for a small number of samples shapes;
- selection of meaningful test methods with potential for international standardization.

In the European standardization community, the proposal was further developed under close cooperation with UK, France and West Germany (so-called "Tripartite-Forum") within ISO TC61/SC1/WG4 and finally published in 1990 as ISO documents 10350 and ISO 11403. In the years after, these two standards were revised several times, most recently in 2008 resp. 2003.

=== Software development ===
The early days

At the beginning of 1987, the process was discussed to speed-up the public awareness for the Grundwertekatalog by developing a unique database format for several raw-material suppliers. This idea was further being discussed within major supply companies of the time, such as BASF, Bayer, Hoechst and Hüls. They found more advantages:

- fulfill the customer demand for comparable data
- replace variety of brochures and datasheets with one database
- accelerate update process
- simplify material pre-selection for plastics (search function)
- establish a single standard, even for other suppliers.

In March 1987, the first meeting was held between experts from these four companies in order to define the architectural needs for the database development:

- easy access to database: which, at that time this meant a PC application distributed by floppy discs
- easy user interface: self-explaining menus and a consistent helping system regardless of the material supplier
- separate data records: the data maintenance shall remain the responsibility of each supplier
- low cost: at that time this was an argument against a centralized client-server-architecture.
- wide usability: IBM-compatible PCs fulfilled this item best; Multi language support was aspired
- easy updating: new releases could be distributed by floppy discs, about one or two times a year, while brochures could only be printed in longer periods. However, it was already seen that a centralized client-server-architecture would be even more beneficial in respect to release frequency.

In further meetings, product requirement specifications were created, and a discussion was held about the naming started. It was finally decided to use the acronym "CAMPUS" (Computer Aided Material Preselection by Uniform Standards), whereby Preselection shall emphasize that for the final choice of material parts testing is essential as well. The programming began and on 23 February 1988, CAMPUS 1.2 was presented in a press conference held during a VDI-K conference. Thereby it was also announced, that any raw material supplier could purchase a licence, but the customer would get standardized data free of charge. The licence includes a commitment to strongly follow the Grundwertekatalog. It was released by Chemie Wirtschaftsförderungs Gesellschaft mbH (CWFG).

Version	Date	Notes
1.2	1988-02-23	First version; text based
2.0	1990	Graphics for diagrams
3.0	1994	DOS-Menus and Mouse control, new data format
4.0	1996	First MS-Windows version
4.1	1998	further physical multipoint records defined
4.5	2001	Chemical resistance and TPEs included
5.0	2004	Multi base polymers; WebUpdate function
5.1	2007	Additive designation, Heat Aging
5.2	2010	Datasheet according to VDA rule 232–201

Overview on the version history for the CAMPUS software

Version 2 and 3

From the start, CAMPUS had an excellent reputation among experts, which allowed for a quick spread and further development. By autumn 1989, a prototype of version 2 was introduced at the K'89 trade show and delivered by mid-1990. The version had an improved user interface and was extended by further single-point values essential for rheological and thermal-calculation programs. For the first time, functional dependencies of properties could be shown in diagrams, e.g. viscosity-shear-diagrams or stress-strain-diagrams. Due to the limited memory space, a concept was introduced that represented a curve by a couple of spline nodes. By August 1990, the system was licensed by 22 European plastic suppliers.

The version 3.0 was a completely new development with a modified data structure. It provided much more usability (menus with mouse-control, searching profile, abbreviations, curve superposition, PostScript printing, preferences storage) by using new hardware features as well as an extended property catalogue following the latest standard revision. The product texts were extended, and the units of measurement could now be switched between SI and US customary units. This version was also the beginning for the globalization of CAMPUS, because it was no longer licensed only by European suppliers but also by DuPont and Dow Chemical from the USA.

Version 4

In Asia, particularly in Japan, there appeared a strong demand for CAMPUS data in 1995. However, the widely used NEC-DOS did not allow for a direct implementation of the software in Kanji text. Therefore, the overdue development of a Microsoft Windows-based version was initiated. This was 4.0, which also allowed for the inclusion of processing data for plastics. Since there is no technical standard established for this kind of data, it was kept separately for each grade and translated into each language. The Version 4.1 would also include DSC-curves and PVT-data.

In 1998, the website http://www.campusplastics.com was established. From that time on, the data could be delivered centrally. Before that, each manufacturer had to do it separately. Apparently, all data was available for download and quicker updates. At about the same time MCBase was published as Proprietary software. This special edition allowed for comparisons between databases from different material suppliers, in spreadsheets and diagrams. Moreover, data could be exported towards CAE-applications.

The next milestone was in 2001, with the inclusion of data for chemical resistance. This type of workload was not standardized in its full complexity. Therefore, the members agreed on a list of chemicals, for which they declared the general usability by means of simple symbols like smiley and stop-sign at 23 °C (73 °F). This allows for a simple search but does not replace a detailed analysis in specific environments. In the same version the class of TPEs was included in CAMPUS with their own set of properties. The standards had to be extended first in this manner, see below.

Simultaneously, the online version was extended. In 2001 was the beginning of WebView, a web application that allowed the online display of CAMPUS data. Unlike the offline version, a quicker search was possible which was especially intended for occasional users. However, the web functionality and availability of internet connections were generally limited, which is why both versions co-existed. Both versions did not allow the user to search or compare data of more than one manufacturer, which remained the main purpose for MCBase or Material Data Center.

Version 5

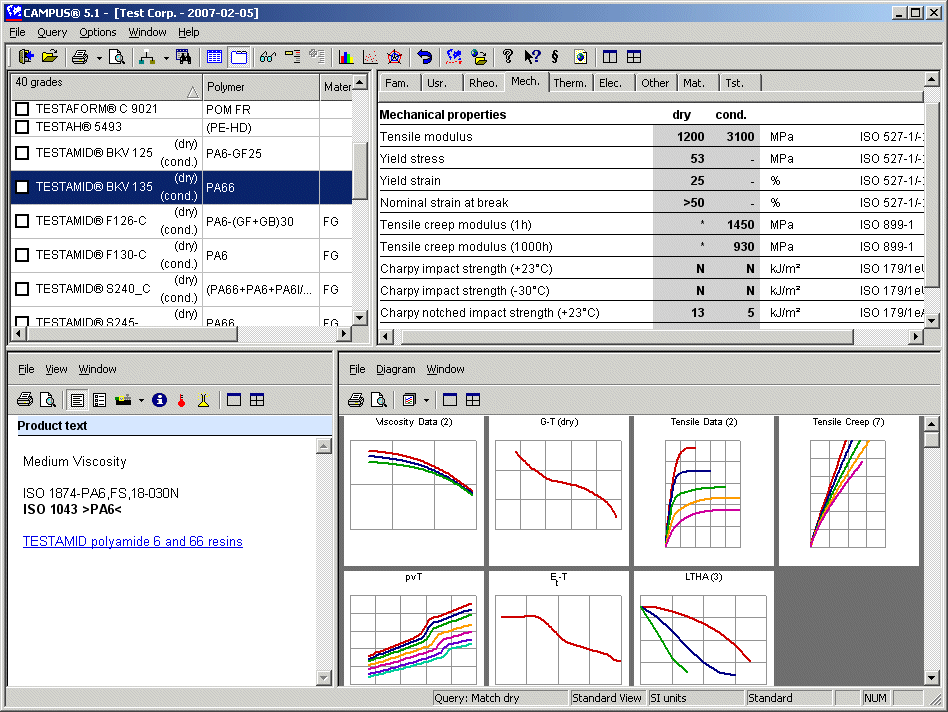
Screenshot of CAMPUS 5.1

With the publication of Version 5, the user interface was updated and the functionality of the internet further included. WebUpdate allowed for the direct update of the database within the application. However, the database itself was only slowly developed, because a high standard was already achieved. A new feature was the implementation of up to three base polymers and up to two filler or reinforcements for blends. In version 5.1 this methodology was extended for impact modified and flame retardant grades. Moreover, heat aging data could be included for the first time.

In January 2010, the version 5.2 was published. This version included several new properties, e.g. light steadiness, extended media steadiness and emission data, and allowed for their reporting together with existing data according to VDA rules 232–201, "Data for Selection of Thermoplastic Materials used in Interior, Exterior and Engine Compartment".

== Grundwertekatalog ==
The Grundwertekatalog contains one part for sample preparation and a second part for processing, mechanical, thermal, electrical, optical and "other" properties. A further group describes the behavior against environmental conditions such as fire, water and humidity. All properties and samples are standardized in ISO 10350 as follows:

Property		Symbol	Standard		Specimen	Unit
Property		Symbol	Standard		(Dimensions in mm)	Unit
Rheological Properties
Melt volume-flow rate		MVR	ISO 1133		Material	cm^{3}/10 min
Melt flow rate		MFR	ISO 1133		Material	cm^{3}/10 min
Molding shrinkage	Parallel (p)	S_{Mp}	ISO 294-4 (Thermoplastics); ISO 2577 (Thermosets)		60x60x2	%
Molding shrinkage	Normal (n)	S_{Mn}	ISO 294-4 (Thermoplastics); ISO 2577 (Thermosets)		60x60x2	%
Mechanical Properties					60x60x2	%
Tensile modulus		E_{t}	ISO 527-1 and -2		ISO 3167	MPa
Yield stress		$\sigma_{\mathrm Y}$	ISO 527-1 and -2		ISO 3167	MPa
Yield strain		$\epsilon_{\mathrm Y}$	ISO 527-1 and -2		ISO 3167	%
Nominal strain at break		$\epsilon_{\mathrm tB}$	ISO 527-1 and -2		ISO 3167	%
Stress at 50% strain		$\sigma_{\mathrm 50}$	ISO 527-1 and -2		ISO 3167	MPa
Stress at break		$\sigma_{\mathrm B}$	ISO 527-1 and -2		ISO 3167	MPa
Strain at break		$\epsilon_{\mathrm B}$	ISO 527-1 and -2		ISO 3167	%
Tensile creep modulus	1h	$E_{\mathrm tc}$1	ISO 899-1		ISO 3167	MPa
Tensile creep modulus	1000h	$E_{\mathrm tc}$10³	ISO 899-1		ISO 3167	MPa
Charpy impact strength	unnotched	$a_{\mathrm cU}$	ISO 179/1eU		80x10x4	kJ/m^{2}
Charpy impact strength	notched	$a_{\mathrm cA}$	ISO 179/1eA		80x10x4	kJ/m^{2}
Tensile impact strength		$a_{\mathrm t1}$	ISO 8256/1		80x10x4	kJ/m^{2}
Puncture impact properties	Max. Force	$F_{\mathrm M}$	ISO 6603-2		60x60x2	N
Puncture impact properties	Puncture Energy	$W_{\mathrm P}$	ISO 6603-2		60x60x2	J
Flexural modulus		$E_{\mathrm f}$	ISO 178		80x10x4	MPa
Flexural strength		$\sigma_{\mathrm f}$	ISO 178		80x10x4	MPa
Thermal Properties
Melting temperature		$T_{\mathrm m}$	ISO 11357-1 and -3		Material	°C
Glass transition temperature		$T_{\mathrm g}$	ISO 11357-1 and -2		Material	°C
Temperature of deflection under load		$T_{\mathrm f}$ 1.8	ISO 75-1 and -2		80x10x4	°C
Temperature of deflection under load		$T_{\mathrm f}$ 0.45	ISO 75-1 and -2		80x10x4	°C
Temperature of deflection under load		$T_{\mathrm f}$ 8.0	ISO 75-1 and -2		80x10x4	°C
Vicat softening temperature		$T_{\mathrm V}$ 50/50	ISO 306		$\ge$ 10x10x4	°C
Coefficient of linear thermal expansion	Parallel (p)	$\alpha_{\mathrm p}$	ISO 11359-1 and -2			10^{−6} K^{−1}
Coefficient of linear thermal expansion	Normal (n)	$\alpha_{\mathrm n}$	ISO 11359-1 and -2			10^{−6} K^{−1}
Burning behavior	1.5 mm thickness	B50/1.5	UL 94	ISO 1210	125x13x1.5	Class
Burning behavior	1.5 mm thickness	B500/1.5	UL 94	ISO 10351	$\ge$150x$\ge$150x1.5	Class
Burning behavior	-.- mm thickness	B50/-.-	UL 94	ISO 1210	125x13x-.-	Class
Burning behavior	-.- mm thickness	B500/-.-	UL 94	ISO 10351	$\ge$150x$\ge$150x-.-	Class
Oxygen index		OI23	ISO 4589-1 and-2		80x10x4	%
Electrical Properties
Relative permittivity	100 Hz	$\epsilon_{\mathrm r}$ 100	IEC 60250		$\ge$60 x $\ge$60 x 1	
Relative permittivity	1 MHz	$\epsilon_{\mathrm r}$ 1M	IEC 60250		60x60x2	
Dissipation factor	100 Hz	tan $\delta$ 100	IEC 60250			
Dissipation factor	1 MHz	tan $\delta$ 1M	IEC 60250			
Volume resistivity		$\rho_{\mathrm e}$	IEC 60093			$\Omega$ m
Surface resistivity		$\sigma_{\mathrm e}$				$\Omega$
Electric strength		$E_{\mathrm B}$1	IEC 60243-1		$\ge$60 x $\ge$60 x 1	kV/mm
Comparative tracking index		CTI	IEC 60112		$\ge$15 x $\ge$15 x 4	
Other Properties
Water absorption		wW	ISO 62 and ISO 15512		thickness $\ge$ 1	%
Water absorption		wH	ISO 15512		thickness $\ge$ 1	%
Density		$\rho$	ISO 1183			kg/m^{3}

=== TPE-Properties ===
Property	Standard	Unit
Stress at 10% strain	ISO 527-1 and 2	MPa
Stress at 100% strain	ISO 527-1 and 2	MPa
Stress at 300% strain	ISO 527-1 and 2	MPa
Nominal strain at break (up to > 300%)	ISO 527-1 and 2	%
Stress at break	ISO 527-1 and 2	MPa
Compression set under constant strain (23 °C)	ISO 815	%
Compression set under constant strain (70 °C)	ISO 815	%
Compression set under constant strain (100 °C)	ISO 815	%
Tear strength	ISO 34-1	kN/m
Abrasion resistance	ISO 4649	mm^{3}
Shore hardness A (3s)	ISO 868	%
Shore hardness D (15s)	ISO 868	%

Beyond these single-point properties, CAMPUS offers the temperature-dependent stress-strain diagram for TPE grades.

=== Diagrams ===
The multipoint data included in CAMPUS are based on the International Standards for comparable multipoint data ISO 11403, Part 1 and Part 2.

Property	x-axis	z-parameter	Symbol	Standard
Shear modulus [MPa]	Temperature [°C]	–	G(T)	ISO 6721-1, 2 and 7
Dynamic shear modulus [MPa]	Temperature [°C]	–	G(T)	ISO 6721-1, 2 and 7
Loss factor	Temperature [°C]	–	$\tan \delta (T)$	ISO 6721-1, 2 and 7
Tensile modulus [MPa]	Temperature [°C]	–	$E_{\mathrm t} (T)$	ISO 527-1, 2 and 3
Stress [MPa]	Strain [%]	Temperature [°C]	$\sigma (\varepsilon)$	ISO 527-1, 2 and 3
Secant modulus [MPa]	Strain [%]	Temperature [°C]	$E_{\mathrm tS} (\varepsilon, T)$	–
Creep stress [MPa]	Strain [%]	Time [h], Temperature [°C]	$\sigma_{\mathrm c} (\varepsilon, t, T)$	ISO 899-1
Creep secant modulus [MPa]	Strain [%]	Time [h], Temperature [°C]	$E_{\mathrm tcS} (\varepsilon, t, T)$	–
Enthalpy [kJ / kg]	Temperature [°C]	–	$\Delta H (T) / m$	ISO 11357-1 and 4
Viscosity [Pa s]	Shear rate [s^{−1}]	Temperature [°C]	$\eta (\gamma, T)$	ISO 11443
Shear stress [Pa s]	Shear rate [s^{−1}]	Temperature [°C]	$\tau (\gamma, T)$	ISO 11443
Specific volume [m^{3} / kg]	Temperature [°C]	Pressure [MPa]	$v (T, p)$	ISO 17744
