= The Campus (TV series) =

Television series

- Genre: Drama
- Created by: Billy Ashaba
- Directed by: Phillip Luswata
- Starring: Elvis Mutebi Andrew; Katusiime Steven; Gloria Adrian; Uwi Mbabazi; Muhawenimana Sarafina; Dolliyantha Phiona; Marie Corrazon; Kalemba Timothy; Kyomugisha Harmony Mwezi; Philip Luswata
- Country of origin: Uganda
- Original language: English
- No. of seasons: 1
- No. of episodes: 23

Production
- Executive producer: JKazoora
- Camera setup: Alternative two camera
- Running time: 30 minutes
- Production company: Buddies

Original release
- Network: NBS TV
- Release: August 19, 2016 – 2017

The Campus is an Ugandan drama television series created by Philip Ashaba. It stars Elvis Mutebi Andrew, Bwanika Baale Felix Katusiime Stephen, Gloria Adrian, Uwi Mbabazi, Muhawenimana Sarafina, Dolliyantha Phiona, Marie Corrazon, Kalemba Timothy, Kyomugisha Harmony Mwezi and Philip Luswata. The series, produced by Buddies Productions, airs on NBS TV on Thursdays and Fridays at 8:30 pm and is considered a hot rival for NTV's The Hostel.

== Plot ==
Andrew (Steven Katusiime) had lived a single life, but after joining campus meets friends with different characters whose lives are a series of fun twists and turns, full of drama and reality.

== Production ==
The pilot episode was shot in 2007, 13 years after the initial writing of the series. It was initially presented to Theater Factory before it disbanded. The series came back into production in 2013. Shortly, eight completed episodes scripts were stolen on a hard disc. The series first came to a hiatus before resuming in 2015 with a fresh cast that including Ugandan film actor Mutebi Andrew Elvisas the protagonist Joel. NBS TV picked up the series and started airing it in 2016.
