= Big Blue (song) =

2019 single by Vampire Weekend

Single by Vampire Weekend

from the album Father of the Bride
- A-side: "Sunflower"
- Released: March 6, 2019
- Length: 1:49
- Label: Spring Snow; Columbia
- Songwriter: Ezra Koenig
- Producers: Ariel Rechtshaid; Ezra Koenig; DJ Dahi

Vampire Weekend singles chronology
"Harmony Hall" / "2021" (2019)	"Sunflower" / "Big Blue" (2019)	"This Life" / "Unbearably White" (2019)

Audio video
- "Big Blue" on YouTube

"Big Blue" is a song by American indie pop band Vampire Weekend. It was the second single from their fourth studio album Father of the Bride, and was released on March 6, 2019 by Columbia Records as a double A-side with "Sunflower".

== Composition ==
The guitars on the track have been compared to those of the Beatles' guitarist George Harrison, while the sparse electronic backdrop has been likened to Kanye West's 808s & Heartbreak (2008).

== Critical reception ==
The song received mostly positive reception from critics, with some criticisms of its short length. Eric Krebs of The Yale Herald praised Big Blue for its sound, saying of the song, "It’s sweet — maybe a bit sugary — and it feels like someone thawed and diced a track or two from their last album, Modern Vampires of the City, threw in some sunshine for flavor, and pureed it in their NutriBullet," but noted its brevity, stating it "just doesn't quite satisfy." Will Gottsegen of Spin gave the track a positive review, stating that it "feels fully realized," but also noted of the song's length, saying, "At less than two minutes, it’s a concise counter to the decidedly knottier 'Sunflower.'"

== Personnel ==
Credits adapted from Father of the Bride's liner notes.

- Ariel Rechtshaid – engineering, mixing
- Chris Kasych – engineering
- John DeBold – engineering
- Hiroya Takayama – engineering
- Takemasa Kosaka – engineering
- Emily Lazar – mastering
- Chris Allgood – mastering assistance

== Charts ==
Chart (2019)	Peak position
US Hot Rock & Alternative Songs (Billboard)	33
