= Only God Was Above Us =

2024 album by Vampire Weekend

- Standard cover for physical releases; alternate cover available at independent retailers

Studio album by Vampire Weekend
- Released: April 5, 2024
- Recorded: 2021–2023 (Note: Lyrics written between 2019–2020.)
- Genres: Indie rock; chamber pop; neo-psychedelia
- Length: 47:00
- Label: Columbia
- Producers: Ariel Rechtshaid; Ezra Koenig; Rostam Batmanglij; Chris Tomson

Vampire Weekend chronology
Father of the Bride (2019)	Only God Was Above Us (2024)

Singles from Only God Was Above Us
- 1. "Capricorn" / "Gen-X Cops" Released: February 16, 2024; 2. "Classical" Released: March 14, 2024; 3. "Mary Boone" Released: March 28, 2024

Only God Was Above Us is the fifth studio album by American indie rock band Vampire Weekend, released on April 5, 2024, through Columbia Records. It marks the third collaboration between the band and their longtime producer Ariel Rechtshaid.

== Background ==
Ezra Koenig began to write the lyrics for Only God Was Above Us between 2019 and 2020, while primary recording sessions took place over the following years in Manhattan, Los Angeles, London and Tokyo. The album was co-produced by Koenig and the band's longtime collaborator Ariel Rechtshaid, with additional production by the band's drummer, Chris Tomson, and former band member Rostam Batmanglij. It was mixed by Dave Fridmann and mastered by Emily Lazar.

The project draws artistic inspiration from a 20th-century New York City aesthetic. The album's title is derived from the headline of a May 1, 1988 New York Daily News article, as shown in the album's artwork photographed by Steven Siegel. This article recounts the incident involving Aloha Airlines Flight 243, in which a structural failure caused the aircraft's roof to be torn off mid-flight. The phrase "Only God was above us" was quoted from one of the passengers.

In a press release, Only God Was Above Us was described as "direct yet complex", showcasing the band at its grittiest, most beautiful, and melodic. The first two singles from the album, "Capricorn" and "Gen-X Cops", were released on February 16, 2024, alongside two music videos.

Only God Was Above Us was released on April 5, 2024. To celebrate the release of the album, the band began the album's tour at the Moody Amphitheater in Austin, Texas on April 8, Koenig's fortieth birthday, during a total solar eclipse. During the tour's encores, they played improvised covers of songs requested by the audience.

== Critical reception ==
Professional ratings
Aggregate scores
Source	Rating
AnyDecentMusic?	8.4/10
Metacritic	88/100
Review scores
Source	Rating
AllMusic	4.5/5 stars
Clash	8/10
Exclaim!	8/10
The Independent	4/5 stars
Mojo	4/5 stars
MusicOMH	4/5 stars
NME	4/5 stars
The Observer	4/5 stars
Pitchfork	8.6/10
Under the Radar	9/10

Only God Was Above Us received acclaim from critics. On Metacritic, the album has a weighted average score of 88 out of 100, based on 23 reviews, indicating "universal acclaim".

Pitchfork gave the album a score of 8.6 out of 10, as well as the site's "Best New Music" designation. The site's Matthew Strauss wrote in his review, "Only God Was Above Us is [also] the most honest album Vampire Weekend have made, an encapsulation of what the band does best, melodic and abstruse in Koenig's own masterful way."

=== Critics' rankings ===
Select year-end rankings for Only God Was Above Us
Publication/critic	Accolade	Rank	Ref.
AllMusic	AllMusic Best of 2024	—N/a	
Billboard	Staff List: The 50 Best Albums of 2024	19	
The Guardian	The 50 Best Albums of 2024	35	
The Independent	The Best Albums of 2024, Ranked	3	
The Needle Drop	Anthony Fantano's Top 50 Albums of 2024	9	
The New Yorker	The Best Albums of 2024	9	
The New York Times	Jon Pareles's Best Albums of 2024	3	
The New York Times	Lindsay Zoladz's Best Albums of 2024	—N/a	
Paste	The 100 Best Albums of 2024	71	
Pitchfork	The 50 Best Albums of 2024	26	
Rolling Stone	The 100 Best Albums Of 2024	43	
The Sunday Times	The 25 Best Albums of 2024 — the Critics’ Choice, Ranked	12	
Time Out	The Best Albums of 2024	7	
Variety	The Best Albums of 2024	—N/a	

Mid-decade critics' rankings for Only God Was Above Us
Publication	Accolade	Rank	Ref.
Pitchfork	100 Best Albums of the 2020s So Far	98	

== Commercial performance ==
The album debuted on the Billboard 200 at number 27, their first album to miss the top 20. It lasted a solitary week on the chart.

== Track listing ==
Only God Was Above Us track listing
No.	Title	Writer(s)	Length
1.	"Ice Cream Piano"	Ezra Koenig; Ariel Rechtshaid	3:36
2.	"Classical"	Koenig	4:19
3.	"Capricorn"	Koenig	4:08
4.	"Connect"	Koenig	5:07
5.	"Prep-School Gangsters"	Koenig	3:48
6.	"The Surfer"	Rechtshaid; Koenig; Rostam Batmanglij	5:43
7.	"Gen-X Cops"	Koenig; Chris Tomson	3:45
8.	"Mary Boone"	Koenig; Nellee Hooper; Simon Law; Beresford Romeo; Caron Wheeler	4:24
9.	"Pravda"	Koenig	4:11
10.	"Hope"	Koenig	7:59
Total length:			47:00

Japanese bonus tracks
No.	Title	Writer(s)	Length
11.	"Broken Washing Machine"	Koenig; Steve Lacy	2:43
12.	"Gen-X Cops" (acoustic)	Koenig; Tomson	3:11
Total length:			52:54

Notes

- "Mary Boone" features a sample from "Back to Life (However Do You Want Me)", written by Beresford Romeo, Caron Wheeler, Nellee Hooper and Simon Law, and performed by Soul II Soul featuring Wheeler.

== Personnel ==
Vampire Weekend

- Ezra Koenig – vocals (all tracks), electric guitar (1–3, 5, 6), acoustic guitar (1, 3, 5, 10), piano (1–8, 10), 12-string acoustic guitar (2), organ (2, 6), synth bass (4), synthesizer (4, 9), keyboards (4, 9), guitar (9)
- Chris Tomson – drums (1, 2, 4, 6, 7, 9)
- Chris Baio – bass (1, 3, 7, 9, 10)

Additional musicians

- Ariel Rechtshaid – drum programming (1–4, 8), electric guitar (1–3, 10), synthesizer (1–9), keyboards (1, 2, 4–9), drums (2, 4, 6, 9, 10), upright bass (2), bass (3, 5–7, 9), harmonica (3), synth bass (4), drum machine (5), Farfisa (5), slide guitar (6, 10), guitar (7, 9), conga (8), tambourine (8), percussion (8), glockenspiel (10)
- Matt DiMona – electric guitar (2)
- Miles Mosley – upright bass (2)
- Henry Solomon – baritone saxophone (2), tenor saxophone (2)
- Isabel Hagen – soprano voice (2)
- Jay Mumford – drums (3), additional drums (10)
- Hamilton Berry – cello (4)
- Dev Hynes – drums (5)
- Eric Gorfain – violin (5)
- Daphne Chen – violin (5)
- Michelle Rearick – cello (7)
- Eliza Bagg – choir (8)
- Jodie Landau – choir (8)
- Luc Kleiner – choir (8)
- Kathryn Shuman – choir (8)

Production

- Ariel Rechtshaid – production, orchestral arrangement (1–4, 6, 8–10), recording
- Ezra Koenig – production, orchestral arrangement (1–4, 6, 8–10)
- Rostam Batmanglij – production (6)
- Chris Tomson – production (7)
- Will Canzoneri – orchestral arrangement (1–4, 6, 8–10), recording
- Dave Fridmann – mixing, Dolby Atmos mixing, additional engineering
- Michael Fridmann – Dolby Atmos mix engineering, additional engineering
- Emily Lazar – mastering
- Matt DiMona – recording
- Kyle Parker Smith – recording
- Dave Schiffman – recording
- Chris Baio – additional engineering

Artwork

- Nick Harwood – art direction
- Steven Siegel – "Subway Dreams" photos
- Michael Schmelling – band photos

== Charts ==
Chart performance for Only God Was Above Us
Chart (2024)	Peak position
Australian Albums (ARIA)	72
Austrian Albums (Ö3 Austria)	18
Belgian Albums (Ultratop Flanders)	22
Belgian Albums (Ultratop Wallonia)	32
Dutch Albums (Album Top 100)	64
French Albums (SNEP)	39
German Albums (Offizielle Top 100)	25
Irish Albums (Official Charts)	21
Japanese Albums (Oricon)	28
Japanese Digital Albums (Oricon)	30
Japanese Hot Albums (Billboard Japan)	37
New Zealand Albums (RMNZ)	38
Portuguese Albums (AFP)	25
Scottish Albums (Official Charts)	4
Spanish Albums (Promusicae)	34
Swiss Albums (Schweizer Hitparade)	9
UK Albums (Official Charts)	11
US Billboard 200	27
US Top Rock & Alternative Albums (Billboard)	8
