= Campus (college) =

Private for-profit junior college in Sacramento, California

Coordinates: 38.6608°N 121.3424°W

- Type: Private for-profit college
- Established: 1965
- Accreditation: ACCJC
- Chancellor: Tade Oyerinde
- President: Michael Zimmerman
- Students: 2,000 (2024)
- Location: Sacramento, California, United States
- Website: campus.edu

Campus is a private, for-profit college in Sacramento, California. Founded in 1965 as MTI Business School and later renamed MTI College, it is accredited by the Accrediting Commission for Community and Junior Colleges (ACCJC) and is authorized to award associate of arts and associate of science degrees.

CampusGroup acquired a controlling interest in MTI College in July 2022. The institution adopted the Campus name in December 2022. Michael Zimmerman remained president, and CampusGroup founder Tade Oyerinde became chancellor.

== History ==
=== MTI College ===
Arnold and Euna Zimmerman founded MTI Business School in Sacramento in 1965 after acquiring franchise rights from MTI Business Schools of Hollywood. The school opened on Capitol Avenue and initially provided vocational business training. It later added computer programming, secretarial, and data-processing courses and became independent of the franchisor in 1968.

The college was accredited by the Accrediting Commission for Independent Colleges and Schools in 1975. It moved to its Madison Avenue location in 1993 and received authorization to award associate degrees in 1994.

The ACCJC institutional directory lists 1999 as the college’s initial accreditation year. The college added medical assisting in 2003, cosmetology in 2006, and phlebotomy in 2008.

Michael Zimmerman became president in 2017. In 2020, the Accrediting Commission for Community and Junior Colleges reaffirmed the institution’s accreditation for seven years.

=== Acquisition and renaming ===
Before CampusGroup acquired an interest in MTI College, Tade Oyerinde had founded Campuswire, a classroom-communication software company.

CampusGroup acquired a controlling interest in MTI College for an undisclosed amount in July 2022. Zimmerman remained president, Oyerinde became chancellor, and a new board of trustees was appointed. The institution retained its Sacramento location and accreditation.

MTI College announced its change of name to Campus on December 9, 2022. The first cohort in the new online business administration associate-degree program began classes in January 2023.

In a report on the acquisition, Robert Shireman of the Century Foundation questioned the college’s use of the term “community college” and argued that its for-profit status should be displayed more prominently. ACCJC president Mac Powell said the transaction differed from many acquisitions of for-profit colleges because MTI had stable finances and retained its president.

== Academics ==
=== Programs ===
Campus offers online associate-degree programs in business administration, information technology, and healthcare administration, with concentrations including applied AI and cybersecurity. Its Sacramento location offers career-focused programs including medical assisting, phlebotomy, barbering, and cosmetology.

=== Online instruction ===
Reports published in 2023 and 2024 described the online degree program as requiring full-time enrollment and attendance at scheduled live classes. The program drew on elements of the City University of New York’s Accelerated Study in Associate Programs model.

Fast Company reported in 2024 that some Campus instructors also taught at other universities, including Princeton, NYU, Vanderbilt, and Spelman College. Inside Higher Ed and TechCrunch reported that Campus paid adjunct instructors approximately $8,000 per course.

=== Tuition and student support ===
As of 2026, Campus listed tuition for its online degree programs at $7,320 per academic year. The institution states that students eligible for the maximum federal Pell Grant may attend with little or no out-of-pocket tuition costs. Reports published in 2024 described the online program as providing academic coaches, mathematics and writing tutoring, and laptops with internet access.

=== Enrollment and student outcomes ===
According to U.S. Department of Education data, Campus had 2,000 undergraduate students in 2024.

In June 2024, Money reported that data from the federal Integrated Postsecondary Education Data System data showed an overall completion rate of 61 percent for Campus. In March 2025, Campus stated that its graduation rate for full-time, first-time students was 68 percent.

=== Sizzle AI ===
In October 2025, Campus acquired Sizzle AI, an artificial-intelligence learning platform founded by former Meta executive Jerome Pesenti, for an undisclosed amount. Pesenti joined Campus as its chief technology officer.
