= Unbearably White =

2019 single by Vampire Weekend

Single by Vampire Weekend

from the album Father of the Bride
- A-side: "This Life"
- Released: April 4, 2019
- Genre: Art pop
- Length: 4:40
- Label: Spring Snow; Columbia
- Songwriter: Ezra Koenig
- Producers: Ariel Rechtshaid; Ezra Koenig; BloodPop (add.)

Vampire Weekend singles chronology
"Sunflower" / "Big Blue" (2019)	"This Life" / "Unbearably White" (2019)	"Capricorn" / "Gen-X Cops" (2024)

Audio video
- "Unbearably White" on YouTube

"Unbearably White" is a song by American indie pop band Vampire Weekend. It was released on April 4, 2019 by Columbia Records as a double A-side with "This Life", and the third single from their album Father of the Bride.

== Background ==
Discussing the track with The Sunday Times before its release, Koenig commented that "infighting among white people about who is marginally more or less white is not particularly interesting", and that the song partially explores that. The phrase "unbearably white" had previously been used as a criticism of the band, in reference to their race.

== Composition ==
The art pop song develops and shifts between isolated vocals, handbells, jazz fusion-inspired bass guitar, and orchestral swells, and lyrically explores a failing relationship. The track's title has been described as a "prank", as the song does not discuss Koenig's racial identity.

== Critical reception ==
For Pitchfork, Sheldon Pearce described the song as "gorgeous", concluding that "as the [song's] characters seek salvation from a bitter coldness, Vampire Weekend find a spark".

== Personnel ==
Credits adapted from Father of the Bride's liner notes.

- Ariel Rechtshaid – engineering, mixing
- Chris Kasych – engineering
- John DeBold – engineering
- Hiroya Takayama – engineering
- Takemasa Kosaka – engineering
- Emily Lazar – mastering
- Chris Allgood – mastering assistance

== Charts ==
Chart (2019)	Peak position
US Hot Rock & Alternative Songs (Billboard)	28
