= Capricorn (song) =

2024 single by Vampire Weekend

Single by Vampire Weekend

from the album Only God Was Above Us
- A-side: "Gen-X Cops"
- Released: February 16, 2024
- Genre: Indie pop; chamber pop; noise pop; neo-psychedelia; baroque pop; post-punk revival
- Length: 4:08
- Label: Columbia
- Songwriter: Ezra Koenig
- Producers: Ezra Koenig; Ariel Rechtshaid

Vampire Weekend singles chronology
"This Life" / "Unbearably White" (2019)	"Capricorn" / "Gen-X Cops" (2024)	"Classical" (2024)

Music video
- "Capricorn" on YouTube

"Capricorn" is a song by American rock band Vampire Weekend, released as the lead single from their fifth studio album Only God Was Above Us. It was released on February 16, 2024, by Columbia Records as a double A-side with "Gen-X Cops", and is the band's first single since 2019's "This Life"/"Unbearably White". The track was written by lead singer Ezra Koenig, and was produced by Koenig and Ariel Rechtshaid.

== Background ==
Vampire Weekend announced their fifth studio album, Only God Was Above Us, on February 8, 2024. "Capricorn" and "Gen-X Cops" were released the following week on February 16.

Lyrically, the song depicts the "aching, unavoidable melancholy of growing old and discovering that adults feel just as powerless as kids do".

== Music video ==
The video was directed by the band's longtime creative director Nick Harwood, and features clips capturing the essence of life in New York City during the late 1980s, concluding with the band performing the song. The video ends with a message of thanks to artist Steven Siegel, whose clips were used in the video, and whose photography inspired the title of the album.

== Charts ==
Chart performance for "Capricorn"
Chart (2024)	Peak position
US Adult Alternative Airplay (Billboard)	4
US Alternative Airplay (Billboard)	24
US Hot Rock & Alternative Songs (Billboard)	41
US Rock & Alternative Airplay (Billboard)	24

== Personnel ==
Credits adapted from Genius.

- Chris Baio – bass guitar
- Will Canzoneri – orchestrations
- Ezra Koenig – vocals, production, acoustic guitar, electric guitar, piano, orchestrations
- Jay Mumford – drums
- Ariel Rechtshaid – production, bass guitar, electric guitar, synthesizer, harmonica, programming, orchestrations
