= Vampire Weekend (album) =

Studio album by Vampire Weekend
- Released: January 29, 2008
- Recorded: 2007
- Studios: Lerner E573; Chris Tomson's family barn; 17 Moultrie; 14-16 Bedford Street; Meserole and Diamond; Meserole and Dobbin; Hicks and Joralemon; Chris Baio's mother's house; Treefort (DUMBO)
- Genres: Indie pop; chamber pop; Afropop; worldbeat
- Length: 34:13
- Label: XL
- Producer: Rostam Batmanglij

Vampire Weekend chronology
Vampire Weekend (2008)	Contra (2010)

Singles from Vampire Weekend
- 1. "Mansard Roof" Released: October 23, 2007; 2. "A-Punk" Released: February 28, 2008; 3. "Oxford Comma" Released: May 26, 2008; 4. "Cape Cod Kwassa Kwassa" Released: August 18, 2008; 5. "The Kids Don't Stand a Chance" Released: November 18, 2008

Vampire Weekend is the debut studio album by American rock band Vampire Weekend, released on January 29, 2008, by XL Recordings. The album was produced by band member Rostam Batmanglij, with mixing assistance from Jeff Curtin and Shane Stoneback. Released after a year of building internet interest, the album showcased the band's unique hybrid of indie pop, chamber music, and Afropop influences.

In the United States, the album debuted at number 17 on the Billboard 200 and peaked at number 15 on the UK Albums Chart during its 11th week. The album also reached number 37 in Australia. It was accompanied by the singles "Mansard Roof", "A-Punk", "Oxford Comma", "Cape Cod Kwassa Kwassa", and "The Kids Don't Stand a Chance".

The album was ranked as the 5th-best album of 2008 by Time, the 56th-best album of the decade by Rolling Stone and 51st on Pitchfork's list of the "Top 200 Albums of the 2000s". In 2012, Rolling Stone ranked the album number 430 on its list of the "500 Greatest Albums of All Time".

== Recording history ==
The album was recorded in a variety of environments including a basement where there was "a good set up for recording drums", a barn, the apartments of two band members, and Tree Fort studio in Brooklyn. The locations bore an effect on the sound that was produced, demonstrated by a session recorded early in 2007 at a barn, which resulted in "really echoey drums". The album draws influence from African pop styles such as soukous and Congolese rumba while incorporating string textures and harpsichords. The group jokingly described this hybrid of indie, afropop, and chamber pop as "Upper West Side Soweto."

In October 2007, the lead singer Ezra Koenig, said that the band had "some of the tracks [...] for a long time", so they were aware of how the album would sound but that it was "just a matter of tightening it up and remixing it a little". Koenig also said that the band was "really excited" and "psyched" about two songs in particular, which were recorded around September 2007, called "I Stand Corrected" and "M79".

The album's cover depicts the chandelier in St. Anthony Hall, a Columbia University semi-secret society. The photo is a Polaroid picture from one of the band's early shows at Columbia.

== Release ==
The album sold over 27,000 copies in the first week of its release, debuting at number 17 on the Billboard 200 and as of 20 January 2010, has sold nearly half a million copies.

The album was ranked as the 5th-best album of 2008 by Time, the 56th-best album of the decade by Rolling Stone and 51st on Pitchfork's list of the Top 200 Albums of the 2000s. In 2012, Rolling Stone ranked the album number 430 on its list of "The 500 Greatest Albums of All Time". The album was also ranked 24 on Rolling Stone's list of 100 greatest debut albums of all time, citing them for having inspired a wave of indie bands with world music influences, despite largely criticizing the album on its release. Paul Simon has spoken out in favor of the album, responding to the derision of some for perceived similarities to Simon's 1986 album Graceland and confirming that he does not consider the album to contain any stolen work.

== Critical reception ==
Professional ratings
Aggregate scores
Source	Rating
Metacritic	82/100
Review scores
Source	Rating
AllMusic	5/5 stars
The A.V. Club	B−
Blender	4/5 stars
The Guardian	4/5 stars
MSN Music (Consumer Guide)	A−
NME	8/10
Pitchfork	8.8/10
Q	4/5 stars
Rolling Stone	3.5/5 stars
Spin	4/5 stars

According to the review aggregator Metacritic, Vampire Weekend received "universal acclaim" based on a weighted average score of 82 out of 100 from 38 critic scores.

Reviewing the album for AllMusic, Heather Phares wrote: "Everything is concise, concentrated, distilled, vivid; Vampire Weekend's world is extremely specific and meticulously crafted, and Vampire Weekend often feels like a concept album about preppy guys who grew up with classical music and recently got really into world music. Amazingly, instead of being alienating, the band's quirks are utterly winning." At The A.V. Club, Gordon Scott stated that "[t]he young band's saving grace is compactness, which not only saves thousands of dollars in kora-player and backup-singer bills, but also keeps things alert and accessible." Talking about the band's array of musical styles in the review for Blender, Ben Sisario felt that "Vampire Weekend’s version of globalization is too tightly and smartly woven to be mere dilettantism, and at times Koenig is emphatic, even desperate, about escaping white-bred familiarity."

In a review for The Guardian, Alexis Petridis wrote: "Behind the penny loafers and songs about commas, there's a bold band that can balance dexterous originality with an innate pop sensibility." Writing for NME, Sam Richards commented that "a mischievous pop sensibility ensures all these little experiments come off as refreshing quirks rather than heinous transgressions." At Pitchfork, Nitsuh Abebe stated: "Bring any baggage you want to this record, and it still returns nothing but warm, airy, low-gimmick pop, peppy, clever, and yes, unpretentious--four guys who listened to some Afro-pop records, picked up a few nice ideas, and then set about making one of the most refreshing and replayable indie records in recent years."

== Track listing ==
All lyrics are written by Ezra Koenig, except where noted; all music is composed by Vampire Weekend, except where noted

No.	Title	Lyrics	Music	Length
1.	"Mansard Roof"			2:07
2.	"Oxford Comma"			3:15
3.	"A-Punk"			2:17
4.	"Cape Cod Kwassa Kwassa"			3:34
5.	"M79 (Note: In the song "M79," there's a lyric "sing in praise of Jackson Crowter [or Crowder or Crowther]." There has been considerable speculation about who Jackson is/was, as well as the spelling. Potential sources included baseball player Jackson Crowther and hockey player Jackson Crowder. The spelling, as published in the band's songbook, is Jackson Crowter. However, the name originated from a schoolmate of Rostam Batmanglij, whose name was Jackson Crowder, per Ben Sisario's interview with Vampire Weekend on Times Talks: Koenig: "I had written some lyrics, and I had a placeholder of somebody that we all actually knew from college, but I didn't want to put their name in. We started brainstorming about someone who had a good name, and then Rostam came up with the best one, and it was someone he used to ride the bus with." Batmanglij: "Yeah, I think he goes to my high school now. I've been trying to reconnect - we'll see where it goes. I actually think I accidentally spelled his name wrong in the lyrics. I think that's for the best, probably.")"	Koenig, Rostam Batmanglij		4:15
6.	"Campus"	Batmanglij, Koenig	Batmanglij	2:56
7.	"Bryn"	Koenig, Batmanglij		2:13
8.	"One (Blake's Got a New Face) (Note: "One (Blake's Got a New Face)" contains elements of "Obeah Wedding" by Slinger Francisco.)"	Koenig, Slinger Francisco	Vampire Weekend, Slinger Francisco	3:13
9.	"I Stand Corrected"			2:39
10.	"Walcott"			3:41
11.	"The Kids Don't Stand a Chance"			4:03
Total length:				34:13

Japanese edition bonus tracks
No.	Title	Length
12.	"Ladies of Cambridge [a.k.a. Boston]"	2:40
13.	"Arrows"	3:04
Total length:		39:57

== Personnel ==
Vampire Weekend

- Ezra Koenig – lead vocals, guitar, piano, hand drum
- Rostam Batmanglij – organ, Chamberlin, piano, harpsichord, guitar, vocal harmonies, drum and synth programming, shaker
- Christopher Baio – bass
- Christopher Tomson – drums, guitar

Additional musicians

- Hamilton Berry – cello
- Jonathan Chu – violin, viola
- Jeff Curtin – hand drums, shaker
- Wesley Miles – vocals
- Jessica Pavone – violin, viola
- Joey Roth – hand drums

Production

- Rostam Batmanglij – production, string arrangements, engineering, mixing
- Jeff Curtin – engineering, mixing
- Shane Stoneback – engineering, mixing
- Emily Lazar – mastering
- Joe LaPorta – mastering assistance

Artwork

- Annie Reeds – cover photograph
- Rostam Batmanglij – additional photographs, design
- Phil Lee – design
- Asher Sarlin – design

== In popular culture ==
- "Campus" was used in Gossip Girl and I Love You, Man.
- "Cape Cod Kwassa Kwassa" was used in Viper Club and a trailer for The Big Sick.
- "Mansard Roof" was used in Grey's Anatomy and Someone Great.
- "Oxford Comma" was used in The Chair, Roswell, New Mexico, New Girl, Suits, How I Met Your Mother and I Love You, Man.
- "A-Punk" was used in the 2008 film Step Brothers and Scott Pilgrim Takes Off.
- "M79" was used as the theme song for the TV series The Chair and in a trailer for the TV series The Paper.

== Charts ==
=== Weekly charts ===
Chart (2008–2010)	Peak position
Australian Albums (ARIA)	37
Australian Hitseeker Albums (ARIA)	1
Belgian Albums (Ultratop Flanders)	37
Belgian Alternative Albums (Ultratop Flanders)	34
Belgian Albums (Ultratop Wallonia)	44
Dutch Albums (Album Top 100)	62
Dutch Alternative Albums (Mega Alternative Top 30)	3
French Albums (SNEP)	81
German Albums (Offizielle Top 100)	85
Japanese Albums (Oricon)	94
Scottish Albums (Official Charts)	19
Swedish Albums (Sverigetopplistan)	44
UK Albums (Official Charts)	15
UK Album Downloads (Official Charts)	5
UK Independent Albums (Official Charts)	1
US Billboard 200	17
US Independent Albums (Billboard)	2
US Indie Store Album Sales (Billboard)	2
US Top Alternative Albums (Billboard)	4
US Top Rock Albums (Billboard)	4

=== Year-end charts ===
Chart (2008)	Position
UK Albums (OCC)	81
US Billboard 200	123
US Independent Albums (Billboard)	9

== Certifications ==
Certifications for Vampire Weekend
Region	Certification	Certified units/sales
Australia (ARIA)	Gold	35,000^{^}
Canada (Music Canada)	Gold	50,000^{^}
New Zealand (RMNZ)	Gold	7,500^{‡}
United Kingdom (BPI)	Platinum	394,220
United States (RIAA)	Platinum	1,000,000^{‡}
^{^} Shipments figures based on certification alone.^{‡} Sales+streaming figures based on certification alone.
