= This Life (Vampire Weekend song) =

2019 single by Vampire Weekend

Single by Vampire Weekend

from the album Father of the Bride
- A-side: "Unbearably White"
- Released: April 4, 2019
- Genre: Pop; pop rock
- Length: 4:28
- Label: Spring Snow; Columbia
- Songwriters: Ezra Koenig; Makonnen Sheran; Mark Ronson
- Producers: Ariel Rechtshaid; Ezra Koenig; Dave Macklovitch (add.)

Vampire Weekend singles chronology
"Sunflower" / "Big Blue" (2019)	"This Life" / "Unbearably White" (2019)	"Capricorn" / "Gen-X Cops" (2024)

Audio sample
- file; help

Music video
- "This Life" on YouTube

"This Life" is a song by American rock band Vampire Weekend, released as the third single from their fourth studio album Father of the Bride. It was released on April 4, 2019, by Columbia Records as a double A-side with "Unbearably White". The highly referential song contrasts bright music against a lyrical exploration of uncertainty and suffering, and was written by lead singer Ezra Koenig with iLoveMakonnen and Mark Ronson. The track was released to widespread critical acclaim, being described as amongst the band's best work, and peaked at 11 on the Billboard Hot Rock Songs chart.

== Composition ==
"This Life" bears strong similarities to Van Morrison's "Brown Eyed Girl" (1967), and has also been compared to Paul Simon's Graceland (1986), with the opening lyrics referencing "It Never Rains in Southern California" (1972) by Albert Hammond. The upbeat pop and pop rock song incorporates bright guitars, handclaps and brushed percussion with a Latin shuffle. The bright music is contrasted against Koenig's lyrics, which explore spiritual uncertainty and inevitable suffering. Koenig co-wrote the song with American rapper iLoveMakonnen, who originally wrote the line "you've been cheating on, cheating on me / I've been cheating on, cheating on you" for his song "Tonight" (2014), and English-American record producer Mark Ronson, who contributed to the song's bass line.

== Critical reception ==
The song received universal acclaim from music critics, and has been described as being among Vampire Weekend's best work to date. Matthew Strauss of Pitchfork awarded the song "Best New Track", praising its storytelling and bright musical palette. Spin's Will Gottsegen praised the song as the highlight of the singles released leading up to Father of the Bride, describing it as "a high water mark for Koenig in the post-Rostam era—a deft interlacing of references, equal parts melancholic and playful". Reviewing Father of the Bride for Noisey, Alex Swhear described the track as "one of the year’s most purely enjoyable pop songs". For Loud and Quiet, Sam Walton commended the song as "the best thing Vampire Weekend have ever recorded, and one of those songs that leaves you baffled as to how, after 60-odd years of recorded pop, it was only written now", praising its songwriting and construction as accessible yet unique, and addictive.

== Music video ==
A music video for the song was released on May 20, 2019, directed by previous collaborator Emmett Malloy. The video depicts Koenig, Danielle Haim and Ariel Rechtshaid riding through the California desert with a driver introduced as Wade (portrayed by Kyle Field), eventually arriving at a Passover Seder hosted by Mark Ronson, with other guests including Sophie, Despot, Simi and Haze and Jovan Hill.

== Personnel ==
Credits adapted from Father of the Bride's liner notes.

- Ariel Rechtshaid – engineering
- Chris Kasych – engineering
- John DeBold – engineering
- P-Thugg (Patrick Gemayel) – engineering
- Hiroya Takayama – engineering
- Takemasa Kosaka – engineering
- Manny Marroquin – mixing
- Chris Galland – mix engineering
- Robin Florent – mix engineering assistance
- Scott Desmarais – mix engineering assistance
- Emily Lazar – mastering
- Chris Allgood – mastering assistance

== Charts ==
=== Weekly charts ===
Weekly chart performance for "This Life" by Vampire Weekend
Chart (2019)	Peak position
Belgium (Ultratip Bubbling Under Flanders)	15
Belgium (Ultratip Bubbling Under Wallonia)	45
Iceland (Tónlistinn)	13
Norway Radio (VG-lista)	26
Scotland Singles (OCC)	35
Switzerland Airplay (Schweizer Hitparade)	91
UK Singles (OCC)	89
US Hot Rock & Alternative Songs (Billboard)	11
US Rock & Alternative Airplay (Billboard)	47

=== Year-end charts ===
Year-end chart performance for "This Life" by Vampire Weekend
Chart (2019)	Position
Iceland (Tónlistinn)	88
US Adult Alternative Songs (Billboard)	5
US Hot Rock Songs (Billboard)	42

== Certifications ==
Certifications for "This Life"
Region	Certification	Certified units/sales
United Kingdom (BPI)	Silver	200,000^{‡}
United States (RIAA)	Gold	500,000^{‡}
^{‡} Sales+streaming figures based on certification alone.
