= Bodine Boling =

American writer and filmmaker

- Born: Bodine Alexander Orban; August 16, 1982 (age 44); Denton, Maryland, U.S.
- Education: Barnard College
- Occupations: Actress, writer, voice artist
- Years active: 2001-present
- Spouse: Alexis Boling
- Website: bodineboling.com

Bodine Alexander Boling (born August 16, 1982) is an American writer and filmmaker. She is best known for writing, producing, starring in and editing the independent science fiction feature Movement and Location.

== Early life ==
Boling was born and raised on the eastern shore of Maryland, attending Saints Peter and Paul High School in Easton, MD.

== Career ==
In 2001, Boling (as Bodine Alexander) starred in "Riders", which was written and directed by Doug Sadler and premiered at the Los Angeles Film Festival. The film later aired on the Sundance Channel.

In 2005, Boling (as Alex Orban) appeared in Swimmers (film), another independent feature film written and directed by Doug Sadler, which premiered at the Sundance Film Festival.

Boling wrote, produced, starred in and edited the independent science fiction feature film Movement and Location. It was a joint project with her husband Alexis Boling, through his production company Harmonium Films and Music.

The film premiered at the Brooklyn Film Festival in 2014, where it won the Audience Award, Best Screenplay and Best Original Score. Other festivals of note include Indie Memphis (2014), where it won the Ron Tibbett Excellence in Filmmaking Award and Best Poster, and the Rome International Film Festival (2014), where it won Best Narrative Feature and the Audience Award. It also played the Atlanta Film Festival and Sci-Fi-London, both in 2015.

In 2019, Boling joined the staff of radio show Live From Here as creative director and announcer.

== Personal life ==
Boling married filmmaker Alexis Boling on September 12, 2009 at the Brooklyn Academy of Music in Brooklyn, New York. Michael Yates Crowley officiated and Vampire Weekend played the reception.

Her grandfather is photographer A. Aubrey Bodine.
