= Mansard Roof (song) =

2007 single by Vampire Weekend

Single by Vampire Weekend

from the album Vampire Weekend
- B-side: "Ladies of Cambridge"
- Released: October 23, 2007
- Recorded: 2007
- Genre: Indie pop; worldbeat
- Length: 2:07
- Label: XL
- Composer: Vampire Weekend
- Lyricist: Ezra Koenig
- Producer: Rostam Batmanglij

Vampire Weekend singles chronology
"Mansard Roof" (2007)	"A-Punk" (2008)

Music video
- "Mansard Roof" on YouTube

"Mansard Roof" is the debut single by indie rock band Vampire Weekend, released on October 23, 2007. It was subsequently included on their eponymous debut album in 2008.

== Title ==
The song is named after a mansard roof mentioned in its lyrics.

== Music video ==
"Mansard Roof" was the first song from Vampire Weekend's album to have a video. The video was filmed in Perth Amboy, New Jersey. The main scene in the video, directed by Alexis Boling, is set on a yacht and uses still frames. The Guardian writer Anna Pickard wrote a commentary about the song, discussing the song itself as "one of the happiest, summeriest songs you could ever imagine" and humorously describing the band as "a bunch of nice little boys on a sailboat having some tea and deciding to be in the sixties [...] whilst experimenting with African pop rhythms and retro shades."

Pitchfork Media writer, Mark Richardson, commented that in the video "they had some fun with their packaged image as clever Ivy League grads by embracing it completely".

== Critical reception ==
Samuel Strang of Drowned in Sound described Koenig's vocals as sounding "as if on a day out from the institution, picking geraniums and wavering with the beauty of the world outside" and said that "whilst utterly unconvincing" that there was "something unwholesomely satisfying about it all". The single was summarised as, "unnervingly gratifying mundane schlop". Nitsuh Abebe of Pitchfork Media described the keyboard as being "set to a perky, almost piping tone, the kind of sunny sound you'd hear in old west-African pop". Strang decried the branding of the band as "afro-pop" and said the single was "far from the 'afro-pop' hyperbole."

Click Music described the two tracks as "beautiful, high-brow indie-pop sparklers that feel like sunshine and roll through the body like smoke expelled from Sinatra's lungs" and said that "Mansard Roof" was "jazzy and bright, trimmed with bulging afro-beats" and called "Ladies of Cambridge" "as stellar as the title-track".

== Track listing ==
1. "Mansard Roof" – 2:09
2. "Ladies of Cambridge" – 2:39

== Personnel ==
Vampire Weekend

- Ezra Koenig
- Rostam Batmanglij
- Christopher Tomson
- Chris Baio

Additional musicians

- Jessica Pavone – violin and viola on "Ladies of Cambridge"

Technical

- Emily Lazar – mastering on "Mansard Roof"
- George Marino – mastering on "Ladies of Cambridge"
