= A-Punk =

Single by Vampire Weekend

from the album Vampire Weekend
- Released: February 28, 2008
- Recorded: 2007
- Genre: Indie pop
- Length: 2:17
- Label: XL
- Composer: Vampire Weekend
- Lyricist: Ezra Koenig
- Producer: Rostam Batmanglij

Vampire Weekend singles chronology
"Mansard Roof" (2007)	"A-Punk" (2008)	"Oxford Comma" (2008)

Music video
- "A-Punk" on YouTube

"A-Punk" is a song by American indie rock band Vampire Weekend, released on February 28, 2008, as the second single from their 2008 self-titled debut album. The band made their network television debut by performing "A-Punk" on the Late Show with David Letterman.

== Critical reception ==
Mark Richardson of Pitchfork described "A-Punk" as having a "spunky drive, pogo-inducing rhythm, and subtle but hugely effective sonic accents" and said that "while solid, [it] isn't one of the stronger songs on Vampire Weekend". Drowned in Sound writer Alex Denney, commented that "A-Punk" was not the best song from their debut album due to it being "a little too uptempo to let their disarmingly clever melodies breathe", but stated "for the flute-aping synths and bottled-sunshine guitars alone you need this in your life." The review from Greg Rose of Gigwise, was mixed. Rose said that although the song lacked originality, it "manages to sound unique" due to the lyrical inventiveness of lines by Ezra Koenig such as, "His honor drove southward seeking exotica/cut his teeth on turquoise harmonicas", which were described as being "perky" and gave the song "a buzzing zip." In reference to "A-Punk", The Times writer Ben Blackmore, said, "Do believe the hype."

"A-Punk" is widely regarded as one of the band's best songs. Paste and Far Out ranked the song number five and number one, respectively, on their lists of the greatest Vampire Weekend songs. In October 2011, NME placed it at number 62 on its list "150 Best Tracks of the Past 15 Years".

== Commercial performance ==
The song peaked at number 55 on the UK Singles Chart and number 25 on Billboard magazine's Hot Modern Rock Tracks chart. The single also reached #6 on the Billboard Bubbling Under Hot 100 chart and #36 on their Canada Rock chart. Though it never reached the Billboard Hot 100, the single was certified Gold by the Recording Industry Association of America (RIAA) in July 2013, making it the band's first gold single.

On October 27, 2008, Vampire Weekend re-released "A-Punk" in the UK, in the hope of achieving a higher Chart placement on the UK Singles Chart. However, "A-Punk" only managed to peak at number 63, which was less than the placement at number 55 earlier that year.

The single continues to be sold over the years. In 2019, it was certified Platinum in the US and in the UK. In 2020, it achieved platinum certification in Canada.

== Music video ==
The music video directed by Garth Jennings, that was said to convey the song's "spiky energy," used footage of the band performing as sped up stop-motion figures, simulating winter and underwater scenes during the performance. Despite the band being sped up, they "never miss an upstroke beat." The video made its worldwide premiere on January 7, 2008, on MTV2's Subterranean indie video block.

== Track listing ==
1. "A-Punk"
2. "Oxford Comma" (Rehearsal version)

== Personnel ==
Vampire Weekend

- Ezra Koenig
- Rostam Batmanglij
- Christopher Tomson
- Chris Baio

Technical

- Emily Lazar – mastering
- Rostam Batmanglij – mixing

== Charts ==
Chart (2008–2011)	Peak position
Canada Rock (Billboard)	36
UK Indie (Official Charts)	12
UK Singles (Official Charts)	55
US Adult Alternative Airplay (Billboard)	23
US Alternative Airplay (Billboard)	25
US Bubbling Under Hot 100 (Billboard)	6
US Pop 100 (Billboard)	91

== Certifications ==
Region	Certification	Certified units/sales
Canada (Music Canada)	2× Platinum	160,000^{‡}
New Zealand (RMNZ)	Platinum	30,000^{‡}
United Kingdom (BPI)	2× Platinum	1,200,000^{‡}
United States (RIAA)	Platinum	1,000,000^{‡}
^{‡} Sales+streaming figures based on certification alone.

== Use in other media ==
The song is featured in the video games Lego Rock Band, Guitar Hero 5, Guitar Hero Live, Just Dance 2, SingStar Guitar, the 2008 film Step Brothers, the 2010 film Furry Vengeance, and the UK television shows The Inbetweeners, Love Island and The Wrong Door. It is also used in the second trailer for Peter Rabbit. It is also featured in the shows Reef Break, Superstore, 90210 and Friday Night Lights. It was also featured in the Netflix series Scott Pilgrim Takes Off. Its most recent use was in a series of advertisements for Dick's Sporting Goods promoting its DSG brand of sports apparel in 2024.
