= Alexis Boling =

American film director

- Born: William Alexander Boling; May 18, 1979 (age 47); Rome, Georgia, U.S.
- Education: University of Georgia
- Occupations: Director, cinematographer
- Years active: 2005-present
- Spouse: Bodine Boling
- Website: alexisboling.com

William Alexander "Alexis" Boling (born May 18, 1979) is an American filmmaker, musician, and founder of production company Harmonium Films & Music based in Brooklyn, New York. He is best known for directing the independent science fiction feature Movement and Location, as well as the music video for indie rock band Vampire Weekend’s debut single "Mansard Roof".

== Early life ==
Growing up in the Deep South, Boling was involved with plays, photography, and music from a young age. While studying at the University of Georgia, he came to realize that film was the culmination of all of those passions, and shortly after graduating from the University of Georgia in 2001 he started Harmonium Films & Music.

== Career ==
Early in his career, Boling worked briefly as a production assistant under filmmaker Albert Maysles who was making a documentary about the Dalai Lama speaking in Central Park at the time. Maysles advised him not to attend film school but rather just to keep making movies on his own. Soon after, Boling sold his car and moved to New York, where he initially lived in a windowless bedroom.

Boling has been living in Brooklyn since 2004, working as a director and cinematographer for film and television.

== Personal life ==
Boling married writer and filmmaker Bodine Boling on September 12, 2009 at the Brooklyn Academy of Music in Brooklyn, New York. Michael Yates Crowley officiated and Vampire Weekend played the reception. They have one daughter.
