= Father of the Bride (album) =

2019 album by Vampire Weekend

Studio album by Vampire Weekend
- Released: May 3, 2019
- Recorded: 2012, January 2016 – August 2018
- Studios: Effie Street (Silverlake, California, U.S.); Vox (Hollywood, California, U.S.); Sony (Akasaka, Minato, Japan) (Note: Except "We Belong Together", recorded at The Stanley's House in Martha's Vineyard, Echo Park Backhouse and Vox; and "Lord Ullin's Daughter", recorded at Heavy Duty in Burbank, CA.)
- Genres: Pop; indie rock
- Length: 57:50
- Labels: Spring Snow; Columbia
- Producers: Ariel Rechtshaid; Ezra Koenig; BloodPop; DJ Dahi; Rostam Batmanglij

Vampire Weekend chronology
Modern Vampires of the City (2013)	Father of the Bride (2019)	Only God Was Above Us (2024)

Singles from Father of the Bride
- 1. "Harmony Hall" / "2021" Released: January 24, 2019; 2. "Sunflower" / "Big Blue" Released: March 6, 2019; 3. "This Life" / "Unbearably White" Released: April 4, 2019

Father of the Bride is the fourth studio album by American indie rock band Vampire Weekend. It was released on May 3, 2019, by Columbia Records, as their first album on a major label.

The release marked the band's first project in nearly six years, following Modern Vampires of the City (2013), and the group's first project since multi-instrumentalist and producer Rostam Batmanglij's departure from the group. It was primarily produced by Modern Vampires of the City collaborator Ariel Rechtshaid and lead singer Ezra Koenig, and features numerous external collaborators, including Danielle Haim, Steve Lacy, Dave Macklovitch of Chromeo, DJ Dahi, Sam Gendel, BloodPop, and Batmanglij. The pop and indie rock album is musically diverse and heavily referential, contrasting heavy and direct lyrics against a bright spring-time musical mood, with its wide range of influences including country music and jam bands.

The album was preceded by three double singles: "Harmony Hall" / "2021", "Sunflower" / "Big Blue" and "This Life" / "Unbearably White". Upon release, it received widespread acclaim from music critics, earning the band their second Grammy Award for Best Alternative Music Album as well as their first nomination for the Grammy Award for Album of the Year. It was also a commercial success, becoming the group's third consecutive album to debut at number one on the US Billboard 200. The band promoted the album with a global tour, featuring an expanded seven-person lineup.

== Background and recording ==
In May 2013, the band released Modern Vampires of the City to critical and commercial success, winning the Grammy Award for Best Alternative Music Album. The album was promoted with a world tour, which concluded in September 2014. Tired from the tour, the band took a break from writing and recording. During this period, Koenig created the animated television series Neo Yokio and co-wrote and produced "Hold Up" from Beyoncé's Lemonade. He also gradually relocated from New York City to Los Angeles.

On January 26, 2016, Rostam Batmanglij announced his departure from the band via Twitter, emphasizing that he and Koenig would continue to collaborate. Later the same day, Koenig announced that Vampire Weekend had begun working on their fourth album, under the working title Mitsubishi Macchiato, with Batmanglij contributing to the record. In November 2016 it was reported that the group had signed to Columbia Records, marking their departure from XL Recordings. During 2016 Koenig spent time writing the album and researching in libraries with grad students. In March 2017, he said the album would feature a "spring-time" vibe and at the time consisted of songs entitled "Flower Moon" and "Conversation".

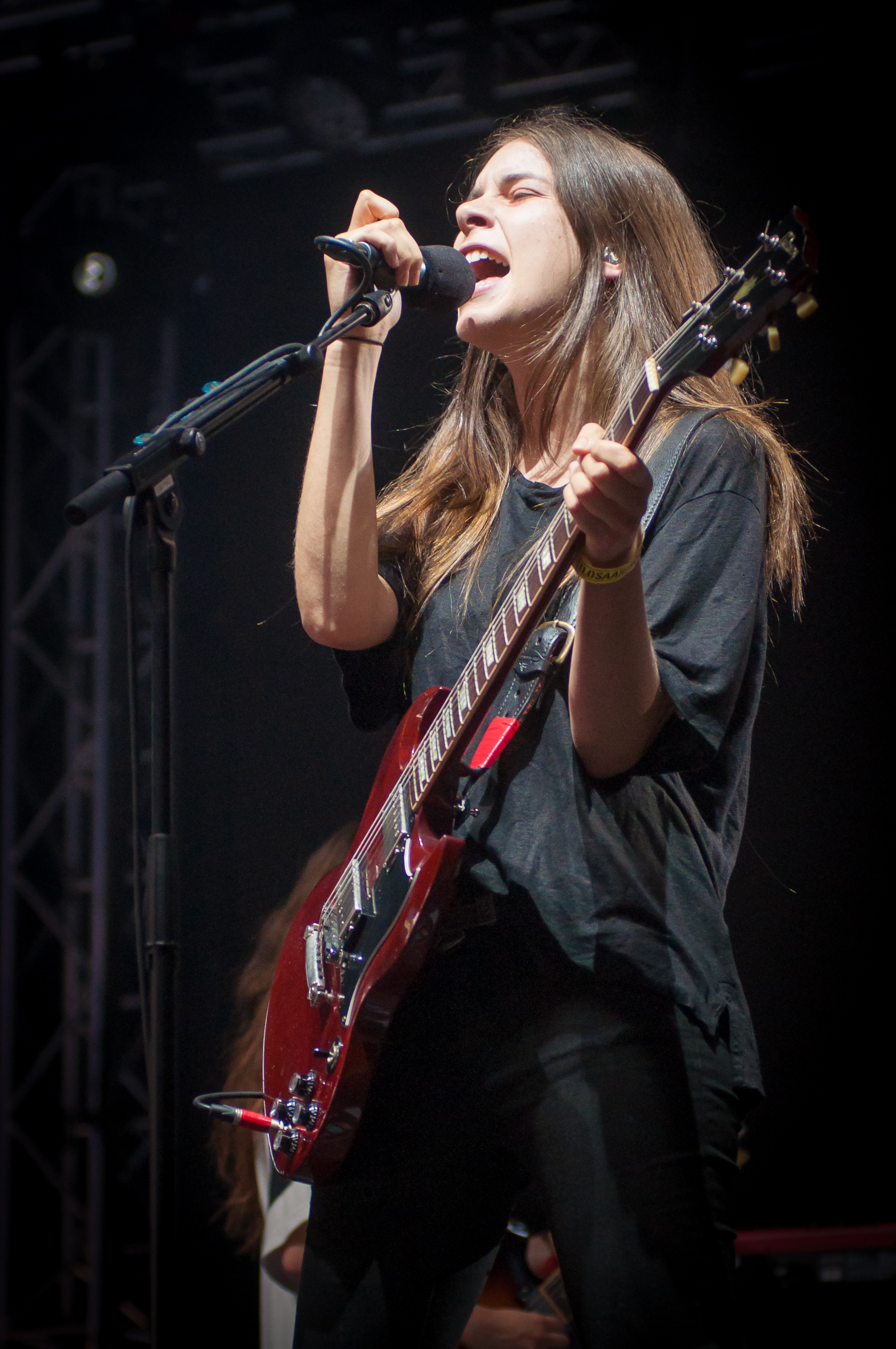
Danielle Haim of pop rock band Haim appears on three country-influenced duets with Koenig and contributes backing vocals throughout the album.

The album was primarily recorded in producer Ariel Rechtshaid's home studio in Silver Lake, Los Angeles – dubbed Effie Street Studios – as well as Vox Studios in Hollywood and Sony Music Studios in Tokyo. This led to numerous collaborations with Rechtshaid's then-girlfriend Danielle Haim. In September 2017 Koenig said the album was "about 80% done". Batmanglij was involved in the album, and in a December interview Koenig noted that their method of partnership had not changed despite Batmanglij's departure from the band.

On the other hand, Koenig's remaining Vampire Weekend bandmates, bassist Chris Baio and drummer Chris Tomson, were not involved in the album. In 2024 Koenig would state that the album was made with "them having some confidence in me to take us somewhere interesting, and me having confidence that they’d be down to kind of wait and still be a part of it."

Koenig also stated that working with Kanye West had inspired him to include a wider variety of musicians on the album, and that his songwriting for the album had been influenced by country singer Kacey Musgraves. On the influence he said, "I'm the type of person who has spent hours poring over the avant-garde poetic lyrics of certain songwriters, and there was something that felt so good [about how] from the first verse, you knew who was singing, who they were singing to, what kind of situation they were in", noting that this hadn't applied to many Vampire Weekend songs. On August 4, 2018, Koenig announced that the album had been completed.

== Music and lyrics ==
The pop and indie rock album is heavily referential both lyrically and musically, channeling a springtime mood despite its "encyclopedic" density. It explores a broader musical palette than past releases by the band, and contrasts warm, pleasant music against heavy and dark lyrics. Key musical styles explored throughout the album include R&B, soul, country, folk, rock, art pop and baroque pop. The double album's wide range of musical styles has been compared to the Beatles' White Album (1968), although Koenig considers the album closer to more thematically cohesive double albums such as Bruce Springsteen's The River (1980) and Paolo Conte's Aguaplano (1987). The loose style of the album has been compared to jam bands such as The Grateful Dead and Phish. It has also been described as more American than the group's earlier work, with Koenig's voice and guitar both adapting a roots twang, and songs channeling the Great American Songbook.

The album's lyrical style is more direct and straightforward than Koenig's previous writing, inspired by American country singer Kacey Musgraves. Themes explored on the album include lost youth, romantic downfall, political strife, uncertainty, doom, complacency, environmentalism, and existentialism, with an eventual arc towards redemption and rebirth. Weddings and churches act as recurring motifs exploring love, and the album frequently features biblical imagery. Koenig considers the album to be more lyrically cohesive than previous work, stating: "the genres, maybe, and the references go all over the place but I actually think lyrically it's one of the most unified [Vampire Weekend] albums".

=== Songs ===
"Harmony Hall"
Lead single "Harmony Hall" incorporates influences from both rave and Baroque music.

"This Life"
"This Life" interpolates rapper iLoveMakonnen, while its upbeat music has been compared to Van Morrison's "Brown Eyed Girl".

"Sunflower"
The psychedelic "Sunflower" features Steve Lacy, and is influenced by jam bands such as Phish.

"Hold You Now" has been described by The Times as "a gorgeous, folky opener". It contains a sample from Hans Zimmer's choral score for The Thin Red Line. It is the first of three duets with Danielle Haim on the album, and its simple lyrics feature Koenig and Haim trading verses about seizing the moment in a relationship. Koenig described these duets as the album's "tentpoles", taking inspiration from country duets by Conway Twitty and Loretta Lynn. He chose to open the album with sparse vocals and acoustic guitar because he thought it was a "weird way to open a Vampire Weekend record". "Harmony Hall" features warm and joyful music, with a "springtime" mood, and has been compared musically to the Grateful Dead's "Touch of Grey" (1987). Influences from rave, baggy and Madchester music from 1990s England, such as "Unbelievable" by EMF, are also evident in its piano and beat, with Baroque elements in its bridge. The "buoyant" music is juxtaposed against dark lyrics, with the track interpolating the line "I don't wanna live like this, but I don't wanna die" from "Finger Back" on the band's previous album Modern Vampires of the City (2013). The brief and eclectic "Bambina", inspired by Couperin's Les Barricades Mystérieuses, features vocoder and "crunchy" guitars. The musically bright and upbeat "This Life" contains handclaps and lively guitars, with Koenig's lyrics exploring "spiritual uncertainty" with levity, interpolating the line "You've been cheating on, cheating on me / I’ve been cheating on, cheating on you" from "Tonight" by American rapper iLoveMakonnen. It has been musically compared to "Brown Eyed Girl" by Van Morrison (1967). "Big Blue" ambiguously explores religious and cosmic uncertainty, with the concise track including ambient arpeggios, sporadic drum samples, "flowery" harmonies, a choir and detuned guitar riffs as it builds dynamically. Its sparse electronic backdrop has been compared to the music on Kanye West's 808s & Heartbreak (2008), while its "weeping" guitar style has been compared to the works of George Harrison.

The "lurching" art pop of "How Long?" contrasts jovial and funky keyboards, sound effects, harmonies and guitars against dark and bitter lyrics about the potential demise of Los Angeles. Writing the song, Koenig was inspired by both hip hop and alternative rock from the 1990s. "Unbearably White" is a "colorful" art pop song, which develops to incorporate isolated vocals, handbells, jazz fusion-inspired bass guitar, and orchestral surges, and lyrically discusses a failing relationship. Despite the title's allusion to criticisms of the band, the track does not primarily explore race. The cryptic "Rich Man" samples palm-wine guitarist S. E. Rogie, and features lush strings, with Koenig "crooning" about romance, wealth and ratios. Koenig began writing the song at the 56th Annual Grammy Awards where the group won Best Alternative Music Album for Modern Vampires of the City. "Married in a Gold Rush" is a "lush" country song, and the second on the album to feature Danielle Haim.

The regretful and moody "My Mistake" incorporates jazz, lounge and experimentalism, featuring "watery" sampled field sounds. The freak folk and flamenco song "Sympathy" contains influences from Schaffel techno, rave, and English rock band New Order. It has been described as "one of the band's most bonkers tracks to date", while Koenig has characterized it as "the most metal Vampire Weekend's ever gotten". The unorthodox and psychedelic "Sunflower" opens with guitar, bass and scatted vocal runs in unison, reminiscent of prog, with its chorus shifting to warm soul-pop. It features abstract lyrics and channels the musical palette of the 1970s, with Koenig comparing the track to the music of Phish. The track features the Internet singer and guitarist Steve Lacy, who also contributed to companion track "Flower Moon", which has been described as an auto-tuned chorale, in the style of the Beach Boys and music from Soweto. "2021" is a minimal and romantic ballad, built around a sample of ambient track "Talking", composed in the 1980s by Haruomi Hosono for Japanese retail company Muji. It features a soft pulsing synthesizer and fingerpicked guitars, along with a distorted vocal sample of the word "boy" sung by Jenny Lewis.

The anthemic and extravagant "We Belong Together" is the third and final duet with Haim, and has been compared to "Mull of Kintyre" (1977) by Wings and the production work of Kanye West. The track incorporates an early demo recorded by Koenig and Rostam Batmanglij at Martha's Vineyard in April 2012, as well as a separate idea Koenig wrote at a piano; Koenig has described it as potentially the band's most "wholesome" song. "Stranger" explores domesticity, musically incorporating saxophones into its relaxed groove. The song's lyric "things have never been stranger; things are gonna stay strange" has been widely highlighted as a microcosm of the album's core message. Koenig has said that the song explores "when you're in a house and you hear other people having a good time and you don't feel left out because you have a sense of belonging". The in media res narrative of "Spring Snow" laments a farewell to a lover, depicting harsh rays of sunglight and heavy snow against a musical backdrop of chamber pop with a Latin groove. The "sad" album closer "Jerusalem, New York, Berlin" references the Balfour Declaration, and has musically been compared to the works of Scottish electronic musician Sophie. Koenig chose the three titular cities for their significance to the Jewish people, in order to explore the "struggle of identity". He also found significance in what the three cities represented more broadly, with Jerusalem signifying religion, New York signifying money and Berlin signifying culture.

The album's Japanese bonus tracks include "Houston Dubai", a cover of Mickey Newbury's "I Don't Think Much About Her No More" (1969) and "Lord Ullin's Daughter". The latter song features English actor Jude Law reciting Scottish poet Thomas Campbell's poem of the same name over a stripped back rendition of "Big Blue".

== Artwork ==
I didn't want it to be a cool photograph of the earth in space, I wanted it to have a little bit of that tension of being Mother Nature, the planet that we live on, but also something border-line uncomfortable with that raw digital whiteness just surrounding it.

— Ezra Koenig

The album's simple cover artwork depicts a globe in a cartoon style that has been compared to the aesthetics of 1960s grass-roots group Another Mother for Peace, 1990s environmentalism and the early internet. The artwork also places emphasis on the Sony Music logo, and has been described as "in keeping with Koenig's idiosyncratic idea of kitsch". Discussing the cover, Koenig commented that he "always knew [he] wanted the Earth to be on this raw digital white background", and expressed interest in the idea of "bright, raw whiteness", such as on a blank piece of paper or the peak of a mountain, as well as on digital screens, relating the idea to the track "Unbearably White". He also stated that the artwork relates to the album's motif of ecology, and a nostalgia for the optimism of environmentalism in the 1990s. He initially considered using the poster for anime film Mobile Suit Gundam 00 Special Edition III: Return the World (2010) as the album's artwork, but decided that due to the album's length "the album cover ha[d] to be incredibly simple. Not full of texture and detail". Koenig has likened this simplicity to the covers of other double albums such as the Beatles' White Album (1968), Fleetwood Mac's Tusk (1979) and Bruce Springsteen's The River (1980).

== Release and promotion ==
In September 2017, Koenig began teasing the album's progression through updates on the percentage of its completion. Music from the album was debuted in June 2018 as a part of the band's first live show since 2014, in Ojai, California. At the show Koenig performed a snippet of "Flower Moon", noting that the song featured Steve Lacy. During the group's Lollapalooza after-show in August, the group debuted new music from Koenig's phone for the audience, including "Harmony Hall" and "Sunflower".

On January 17, 2019, Koenig announced the album title's initialism, FOTB, as well as its length. He also revealed that the album would be promoted by three monthly double A-side singles. The album's first singles, "Harmony Hall" and "2021", were released on January 24, 2019, with the album's full title announced. A music video for "Harmony Hall" was released in February, directed by Emmett Malloy. The second double single, consisting of "Sunflower" featuring Lacy, and "Big Blue" was released on March 6, alongside an announcement of the album's May 3 release date and artwork. The Jonah Hill-directed music video for "Sunflower" was released the following week. The final double single was released on April 4, including "This Life" and "Unbearably White". A music video for "This Life" was released on May 20, also directed by Malloy.

While released as a Vampire Weekend album, Father of the Bride was presented as an Ezra Koenig solo project in which he appeared by himself in promotional photos without Chris Baio and Chris Tomson, who weren't involved in the album's creation but would remain part of the band for its live shows. In 2024, Koenig explained that presenting the album as a solo project was a means of protecting the band through a difficult transition after losing a member and following up their most acclaimed album to date, at a time when the era of indie music they emerged from had come to an end.

On February 28, 2020, a deluxe version of the album was released on digital platforms, containing three tracks which had previously only been available on the album's Japanese release.

=== Tour and live performances ===
The band incorporated an expanded touring line-up to promote the album, with Brian Robert Jones, Greta Morgan, Garrett Ray and Will Canzoneri joining the group. In January 2019, the band announced a North American tour, beginning on May 17 at Gulf Shores, Alabama, for Hangout Music Festival. Supporting acts for the tour include Angélique Kidjo, Despot and Soccer Mommy. In March further performances were announced across Europe. The group also promoted the album in a series of shows dubbed the "Three Little London Shows" in March. On May 5, two days after the album's release, the band performed three consecutive sets at Webster Hall in New York City, including a performance of the album in full and a majority of the group's back catalogue, as well as appearances by Haim and Dev Hynes. The show concluded a three-stop tour of New York State. During a September performance at Madison Square Garden, the band announced new 2020 tour dates.

On March 21, the group appeared on BBC Radio 1's Live Lounge, performing "Harmony Hall" and a cover of "Sunflower" by Post Malone and Swae Lee, in reference to the album's track of the same name. In the week following the album's release, they appeared on The Tonight Show Starring Jimmy Fallon, performing "This Life" and "Jerusalem, New York, Berlin" alongside Haim, and on Jimmy Kimmel Live!, performing "Sunflower". On June 26, the band performed a piano-driven version of "This Life" and a cover of Bruce Springsteen's "I'm Goin' Down" (1985) at New York's Electric Lady Studios for the Spotify Singles series. The group performed, promoting the album, at the Glastonbury Festival.

== Reception ==
=== Critical response ===
Professional ratings
Aggregate scores
Source	Rating
AnyDecentMusic?	7.5/10
Metacritic	82/100
Review scores
Source	Rating
AllMusic	4.5/5 stars
Chicago Tribune	2.5/4 stars
The Daily Telegraph	4/5 stars
The Guardian	4/5 stars
The Independent	4/5 stars
NME	4/5 stars
The Observer	4/5 stars
Pitchfork	8.0/10
Rolling Stone	4.5/5 stars
Vice (Expert Witness)	B+

Father of the Bride was met with widespread critical acclaim. At Metacritic, which assigns a normalized rating out of 100 to reviews from mainstream publications, the album has received an average score of 82, based on 33 reviews. The aggregator AnyDecentMusic? gave it 7.5 out of 10, based on its assessment of the critical consensus.

David Fricke of Rolling Stone described the album as a "masterpiece", praising its meticulous attention to detail and musical breadth, and concluding that "Vampire Weekend now look like the smartest guys in the room, marshalling a sumptuous, emotionally complex music perfect in this pop moment". The Guardian's Alexis Petridis wrote that the album showcased "a band pushing past their boundaries with striking results", and that the few ineffective ideas on the album are significantly outweighed by its highlights. Kitty Empire of sister publication The Observer praised the album's breadth and maturity, writing that it "exudes warmth and no little sonic familiarity, while reflecting what is a radically altered set-up". Chris DeVille of Stereogum wrote that the album could potentially be the group's magnum opus and that it "manages to be both a casual joyride and a multi-layered dissertation on the world's ills". Variety's Zack Ruskin asserted that the album consists of "inventive, often brilliant ideas delivered with little concern for how palatable listeners might find them", concluding that the album's pleasant music "could soundtrack an afternoon picnic" while its esoteric lyrics could "be used as fodder for a doctorate thesis on songwriting". For The Wall Street Journal, Mark Richardson wrote that the album's quality justified the long wait for its release, writing that despite its length the album felt focused as opposed to sprawling.

Jon Pareles of The New York Times praised the album's contrast between heavy lyrics and bright music, while Neil McCormick of The Daily Telegraph complimented Koenig's "joyous" experimentation with music and incisive language, advising listeners not to take the record too seriously. For The Independent, Jazz Monroe commended Koenig for maturing without becoming self-serious, writing that the album's low stakes and "unfashionable" nature were its strongest features. In her review for AllMusic, Heather Phares wrote that the album "finds Vampire Weekend embracing change and delivering some of their most mature and satisfying music in the process". Thomas Smith of NME praised the album's fun nature, writing that it "sounds like the work of some pals noodling away in the studio and shooting the shit" and "more often than not it's a hit, not a miss". In Robert Christgau's Expert Witness column for Vice, he applauded Koenig's complex exploration of class, describing it as a "sprightly, allusive, elusive, technically accomplished collection" that generally "bespeak[s] some fraught combination of lost youth, career anxiety, and, way down deep, political dismay." His one caveat was that the songs are "melodic yet seldom uplifting or effervescent".

In a more critical review, Greg Kot of the Chicago Tribune described the album as "mild", noting that Koenig's lyrical expressions of discomfort were not conveyed through the pleasant music. For Pitchfork, Mike Powell opined that the album was somewhat overlong and dispensable compared to past releases, and that its discussion of contentment and belonging felt unsuited to the group, but praised the album's braveness and new musical direction. Steven Edelstone of Paste criticized the album's lyrics, and Koenig's adoption of a "derivative" musical style that did not fit the band, concluding that "it's simply impossible not to wonder what happened and where they lost their way, culminating in a major disappointment for perhaps the most anticipated indie rock album in recent memory". Spin's Jordan Sargent argued that the album was likely the band's worst, yet still rewarding. He praised the band's development, writing: "On the one hand, everything sounds spectacular; on the other, the album does contain some of the worst ideas the band has ever put to tape".

=== Accolades and honors ===
At the 62nd Annual Grammy Awards, Father of the Bride was awarded Best Alternative Music Album. The album was also the group's first to be nominated for Album of the Year, while "Harmony Hall" was nominated for Best Rock Song.

The album appeared on multiple 2019 year-end lists. At Album of the Year, a website which creates an aggregate of music critic's year-end lists, Father of the Bride was listed at rank 11 for 2019. Entertainment Weekly and Thrillist named it the best album of the year, while Vulture, The Observer's Kitty Empire, Us Weekly, British GQ and Stereogum listed it in their top five. The Los Angeles Times, Slant, BrooklynVegan, Rolling Stone, Consequence of Sound and Slate included the album in their top ten, while it was listed among the top 25 by Billboard, NME, The Guardian, Flood Magazine, The Atlantic, Paste, GQ and Pitchfork. Other publications that included Father of the Bride in their year-end lists include Complex, Uncut, Uproxx, Mojo, and AllMusic.

The album was also included in decade-end lists for the 2010s by BrooklynVegan (35), Stereogum (84) and Rolling Stone (92).

=== Commercial performance ===
Father of the Bride debuted at number one on the US Billboard 200 with 138,000 album-equivalent units, including 119,000 pure album sales. It is Vampire Weekend's third consecutive US number-one album. Additionally, 13 songs from the album, including all six of its singles, reached the top 50 of Billboard's US Hot Rock Songs chart. The album also reached number two in the UK and Scotland, and the top ten in Portugal, Ireland, Canada, Australia and the Flemish Region of Belgium.

== Track listing ==
Credits adapted from the album's liner notes and Tidal.

Father of the Bride track listing
No.	Title	Writer(s)	Producer(s)	Length
1.	"Hold You Now" (featuring Danielle Haim)	Ezra Koenig; Hans Zimmer	Ariel Rechtshaid; Koenig	2:33
2.	"Harmony Hall"	Koenig	Rechtshaid; Koenig; Rostam Batmanglij^{[a]}	5:08
3.	"Bambina"	Koenig	Rechtshaid; Koenig	1:42
4.	"This Life"	Koenig; Makonnen Sheran; Mark Ronson	Rechtshaid; Koenig; Dave Macklovitch^{[a]}	4:28
5.	"Big Blue"	Koenig	Rechtshaid; Koenig; DJ Dahi	1:48
6.	"How Long?"	Koenig; William Shelby; Stephen Shockley; Leon F. Silvers III	Rechtshaid; Koenig; Macklovitch^{[a]}	3:32
7.	"Unbearably White"	Koenig	Rechtshaid; Koenig; BloodPop^{[a]}	4:40
8.	"Rich Man"	Koenig; S. E. Rogie	Rechtshaid; Koenig	2:29
9.	"Married in a Gold Rush" (featuring Danielle Haim)	Koenig	Rechtshaid	3:42
10.	"My Mistake"	Koenig; Ludwig Göransson	Rechtshaid; Koenig; DJ Dahi; Buddy Ross^{[a]}	3:18
11.	"Sympathy"	Koenig; Rechtshaid	Rechtshaid; Koenig	3:46
12.	"Sunflower" (featuring Steve Lacy)	Koenig	Rechtshaid; Koenig	2:17
13.	"Flower Moon" (featuring Steve Lacy)	Koenig; Rechtshaid; Sam Gendel	Rechtshaid; Koenig; Lacy^{[a]}	3:57
14.	"2021"	Haruomi Hosono; Koenig	Rechtshaid; Koenig	1:38
15.	"We Belong Together" (featuring Danielle Haim)	Koenig; Batmanglij	Batmanglij	3:10
16.	"Stranger"	Koenig	Rechtshaid; Koenig	4:08
17.	"Spring Snow"	Koenig; BloodPop; Gendel	Rechtshaid; Koenig; BloodPop; Ross^{[a]}	2:40
18.	"Jerusalem, New York, Berlin"	Koenig	Rechtshaid; Koenig; BloodPop^{[a]}; Ross^{[a]}	2:54
Total length:				57:50

Japanese and deluxe bonus tracks
No.	Title	Writer(s)	Producer(s)	Length
19.	"Houston Dubai"	Koenig	Rechtshaid; Koenig	2:19
20.	"I Don't Think Much About Her No More"	Mickey Newbury	Rechtshaid; DJ Dahi	2:49
21.	"Lord Ullin's Daughter" (featuring Jude Law)	Koenig (music); Thomas Campbell (text)	Rechtshaid; DJ Dahi	3:38
Total length:				66:36

Notes

- ^{^[a]} signifies an additional producer

Samples

- "Hold You Now" contains a sample of "God Yu Tekem Laef Blong Mi", composed by Hans Zimmer, from the film The Thin Red Line.
- "How Long?" contains elements of "And the Beat Goes On", written by William Shelby, Stephen Shockley and Leon F. Silvers III.
- "Rich Man" contains a sample of "Please Go Easy With Me", written and performed by S. E. Rogie.
- "2021" contains a sample of "Talking", written by Haruomi Hosono.

== Personnel ==
Adapted from the album's liner notes and Tidal.

=== Musicians ===
According to the album's liner notes. (Note: No official list of musicians has been released, and thus the following list is not comprehensive.)

- Ezra Koenig – lead vocals, guitars
- Rostam Batmanglij – 12-string acoustic guitar (15)
- Matt Chamberlain – drums (15)
- Sam Gendel – saxophone (10)
- Danielle Haim – lead vocals (1, 9, 15), backing vocals (2, 4, 11, 13, 16, 18, 20)
- Tommy King – piano (2, 9)
- Steve Lacy – lead vocals (12, 13), backing vocals (10), acoustic guitar (10)
- Jude Law – lead vocals (21)
- Greg Leisz – electric guitar (2, 16), pedal steel guitar (2, 16)
- Jenny Lewis – vocal sample (14)
- David Longstreth – backing vocals (2), guitar (2)
- Jake Longstreth – guitar (4)
- Serena McKinney – violins (7, 8)
- John Nixon – guitar (16)
- Ariel Rechtshaid – guitar (16)
- Buddy Ross – synthesizers (2, 7, 10, 17, 18), Wurlitzer (2, 7), piano (10, 17, 18), strings (10), backing vocals (10, 17)

=== Technical ===
- Ariel Rechtshaid – engineering (1–14, 16–21), mixing (1, 3, 5–14, 16–21)
- Chris Kasych – engineering (1–14, 16–19)
- John DeBold – engineering (1–14, 16–21)
- Hiroya Takayama – engineering (1–14, 16–19)
- Takemasa Kosaka – engineering (1–14, 16–19)
- Dave Schiffman – engineering (2, 8, 9, 12, 19)
- P-Thugg (Patrick Gemayel) – engineering (4)
- Michael Harris – engineering (9, 13, 15, 16)
- Buddy Ross – engineering (10), mixing (10)
- Shawn Everett – engineering (11), mixing (1, 16)
- Rostam Batmanglij – engineering (15), mixing (15)
- Dalton Ricks – engineering (15)
- Nick Rowe – engineering (15)
- Jude Law – engineering (21)
- Manny Marroquin – mixing (2, 4)
- Chris Galland – mix engineering (2, 4)
  - Robin Florent – assistance (2, 4)
  - Scott Desmarais – assistance (2, 4)
- Ezra Koenig – mixing (14, 19–21)
- Emily Lazar – mastering
  - Chris Allgood – assistance

=== Artwork ===
- Nick Harwood – art direction
- Primo Kahn – cover design
- Public-Library – cover design
- Brendan Ratzlaff – illustration

== Charts ==
=== Weekly charts ===
Chart (2019)	Peak position
Australian Albums (ARIA)	8
Austrian Albums (Ö3 Austria)	13
Belgian Albums (Ultratop Flanders)	8
Belgian Albums (Ultratop Wallonia)	24
Canadian Albums (Billboard)	6
Dutch Albums (Album Top 100)	11
French Albums (SNEP)	38
German Albums (Offizielle Top 100)	21
Irish Albums (Official Charts)	5
Italian Albums (FIMI)	77
Japan Hot Albums (Billboard Japan)	58
Japanese Albums (Oricon)	30
New Zealand Albums (RMNZ)	24
Norwegian Albums (VG-lista)	14
Portuguese Albums (AFP)	3
Scottish Albums (Official Charts)	2
Spanish Albums (Promusicae)	34
Swedish Albums (Sverigetopplistan)	31
Swiss Albums (Schweizer Hitparade)	15
UK Albums (Official Charts)	2
US Billboard 200	1
US Top Rock Albums (Billboard)	1

=== Year-end charts ===
Chart (2019)	Position
US Billboard 200	200
US Alternative Albums	20
US Rock Albums	36

== Certifications ==
Region	Certification	Certified units/sales
United Kingdom (BPI)	Silver	60,000^{‡}
United States (RIAA)	Gold	500,000^{‡}
^{‡} Sales+streaming figures based on certification alone.

== Release history ==
Region	Date	Label	Format	Catalog
Various	May 3, 2019	Spring Snow; Columbia	Digital download; streaming	
Various	May 3, 2019	Spring Snow; Columbia	CD	19075930132 (US)
Various	May 3, 2019	Spring Snow; Columbia	LP	19075930141 (US)
Various	May 3, 2019	Spring Snow; Columbia	Cassette	19075946164 (US)
Japan	May 15, 2019	Sony Records International	CD	SICP-6117
