= Diane Young =

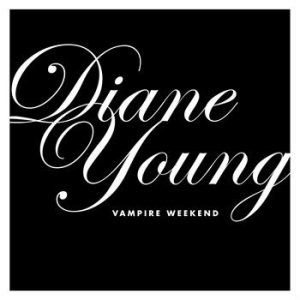

Single by Vampire Weekend

from the album Modern Vampires of the City
- A-side: "Step"
- Released: March 19, 2013
- Genre: Indie rock
- Length: 2:40
- Label: XL Recordings
- Composers: Rostam Batmanglij; Ezra Koenig
- Lyricist: Ezra Koenig
- Producers: Rostam Batmanglij; Ariel Rechtshaid

Vampire Weekend singles chronology
"Run" (2010)	"Diane Young" / "Step" (2013)	"Ya Hey" (2013)

Music video
- "Diane Young" on YouTube

"Diane Young" is a song by American indie rock band Vampire Weekend, taken from their third studio album Modern Vampires of the City. It was released as the lead single from the album on March 19, 2013. A promotional video of the single, which features two Saab 900s burning throughout the duration of the song, was uploaded to Vevo and YouTube on March 18, 2013. The official video to the single was uploaded on June 3, 2013.

== Background ==
The band has since stated that the song title and concept is a play on the phrase "Dying young".

== Commercial performance ==
"Diane Young" peaked at #11 on the Billboard Alternative Songs chart. It also reached number 17 on the Billboard Hot Rock Songs chart and number 50 on UK Singles Chart.

== Music videos ==
The promotional video for "Diane Young", dubbed the "official stream", was released on March 18, 2013. Throughout the duration of the video, two 900-series Saabs are shown burning in slow motion. The opening lyric for the song, "You torched a Saab like a pile of leaves", served as the inspiration for the video. According to an interview with Vancouver's The Peak radio station, the video for "Diane Young" was made with only five seconds of footage from a Phantom Cam which films at 1000 frames per second. The video concept came from Vampire Weekend member Rostam Batmanglij's friend Borna Sammak, and was filmed while the band was performing at SXSW. There were allegations that the cars had been purchased under false pretenses and that the original owners had not been informed their cars would be destroyed. Vampire Weekend stated publicly that they were "stunned by the accusation", and denied any deliberate deceit in the purchase of the cars.

The official video for "Diane Young" premiered on June 3, 2013. The video was directed by Primo Kahn and features cameos from Santigold, Chromeo, Sky Ferreira, Despot, Dave Longstreth from Dirty Projectors and Hamilton Leithauser from The Walkmen. The video parodies Leonardo da Vinci's The Last Supper, depicting a dinner party that becomes progressively chaotic, attended by members of the band and other guests. An unidentified and disinterested man wearing a balaclava, analogous to Jesus in The Last Supper, is at the party (and video's) center.

== Personnel ==
Vampire Weekend

- Chris Baio – bass
- Rostam Batmanglij – piano, guitars, banjo, vocal harmonies and backing vocals, drum and synth programming, keyboards, shaker
- Ezra Koenig – lead vocals
- Chris Tomson – drums

Additional musicians

- Adam Schatz – saxophone
- Jeff Curtin – additional drums
- Ariel Rechtshaid – additional drum and synth programming

Technical

- Rich Costey – mixing
- Chris Kasych – mix assistance, Pro Tools engineering
- Eric Isip – assistance
- Emily Lazar – mastering
- Joe LaPorta – mastering

== Charts ==
=== Weekly charts ===
Chart (2013)	Peak position
Canada Rock (Billboard)	29
Japan Hot 100 (Billboard)	37
Mexico Ingles Airplay (Billboard)	28
UK Singles (OCC)	50
US Bubbling Under Hot 100 (Billboard)	19
US Hot Rock & Alternative Songs (Billboard)	17
US Rock & Alternative Airplay (Billboard)	20
US Alternative Airplay (Billboard)	11

=== Year-end charts ===
Chart (2013)	Position
US Hot Rock Songs (Billboard)	43
US Alternative Songs (Billboard)	31

== Certifications ==
Region	Certification	Certified units/sales
Canada (Music Canada)	Gold	40,000^{‡}
United States (RIAA)	Gold	500,000^{‡}
^{‡} Sales+streaming figures based on certification alone.
