= LP (Discovery album) =

Studio album by Discovery
- Released: July 7, 2009
- Recorded: July 2005 – January 2009
- Genre: Electropop
- Length: 29:54
- Label: XL
- Producers: Rostam Batmanglij, Wes Miles, Ezra Koenig

LP is the debut and only album by the band Discovery, released July 7, 2009 on vinyl on July 14, 2009 on CD via XL Recordings.

== Reception ==
Professional ratings
Review scores
Source	Rating
Allmusic	4/5 stars
The A.V. Club	A−
Drowned in Sound	4/10
The New York Times	Favorable
NME	7/10
Pitchfork Media	6.8/10
Planet Sound	4/10
Rolling Stone	3/5 stars
Robert Christgau	(choice cut)

Initial critical response to LP was generally favorable.

== Track listing ==
No.	Title	Writer(s)	Length
1.	"Orange Shirt"	Rostam Batmanglij, Wes Miles	3:31
2.	"Osaka Loop Line"	Batmanglij, Miles, Ezra Koenig	4:02
3.	"Can You Discover?"	Batmanglij, Miles	2:22
4.	"I Wanna Be Your Boyfriend" (featuring Angel Deradoorian)	Batmanglij, Miles	2:40
5.	"So Insane"	Batmanglij, Miles	3:13
6.	"Swing Tree"	Batmanglij, Miles	2:38
7.	"Carby" (featuring Ezra Koenig)	Batmanglij, Miles, Koenig	3:07
8.	"I Want You Back"	Batmanglij, Miles, The Corporation	3:26
9.	"It's Not My Fault (It's My Fault)"	Batmanglij, Miles	2:34
10.	"Slang Tang"	Batmanglij, Miles	2:28

iTunes Store bonus track
No.	Title	Length
11.	"Orange Shirt (Rock Remix) [Bonus Track]"	3:32

== Personnel ==
- Rostam Batmanglij – vocals, drum and synth programming and playing
- Wes Miles – vocals, drum and synth programming and playing
