= The Orchard (Ra Ra Riot album) =

Studio album by Ra Ra Riot
- Released: August 24, 2010
- Genre: Indie rock; indie pop; baroque pop
- Length: 39:06
- Label: Barsuk
- Producer: Ra Ra Riot, Andrew Maury

Ra Ra Riot chronology
The Rhumb Line (2008)	The Orchard (2010)	Beta Love (2013)

Professional ratings
Aggregate scores
Source	Rating
Metacritic	70/100
Review scores
Source	Rating
Allmusic	3/5 stars
Lost In The Sound	7.0
Pitchfork Media	(5.7/10)
Pop Matters	9/10 stars
Slant	4/5 stars
Spin	6/10 stars
The Tune	3.2/5
Rockfeedback	4/5 stars

The Orchard is the second studio album of the American indie rock band Ra Ra Riot. On October 26, 2010, the song "Boy" was made available for 69 cents in iTunes Store and garnered some interest reaching a peak of no. 152 on the iTunes popularity chart while also charting at No. 34 on the Billboard Rock Digital chart.

== Track listing ==
All tracks are written by Ra Ra Riot (Wes Miles, Mathieu Santos, Milo Bonacci, Alexandra Lawn, Rebecca Zeller).

No.	Title	Length
1.	"The Orchard"	3:29
2.	"Boy"	3:10
3.	"Too Dramatic"	3:04
4.	"Foolish"	4:01
5.	"Massachusetts"	5:38
6.	"You and I Know"	4:34
7.	"Shadowcasting"	3:40
8.	"Do You Remember"	3:31
9.	"Kansai"	4:13
10.	"Keep It Quiet"	3:46

== Japanese Track listing ==
No.	Title	Length
11.	"Too Dramatic (Original Demo)"	1:46
12.	"You And I Know (Penn Yan Demo)"	5:45
13.	"Kansai (Chuck Brody Remix)"	3:52
14.	"Saccharin And The War (Sparks Cover)"	3.52

=== Videos ===
- "Boy": Directed by Adam Levite
- "Too Dramatic": Directed by Andrew Thomas Huang

== Personnel ==
=== Ra Ra Riot ===
- Milo Bonacci - Guitar, Keyboards
- Alexandra Lawn - Cello, Vocals
- Wes Miles - Vocals, Keyboards
- Mathieu Santos - Bass
- Rebecca Zeller - Violin
- Gabe Duquette - Drums

=== Additional personnel ===
- Andrew Maury - Co-producer, Engineer
- Chris Walla - Mixer (Tracks 1–7, 9–10)
- Rostam Batmanglij - Mixer (Track 8)
- Greg Calbi - Mastering Engineer
