= I Had a Dream That You Were Mine =

Studio album by Hamilton Leithauser and Rostam
- Released: September 23, 2016
- Recorded: July 2014–February 2016
- Genre: Indie rock
- Length: 40:34
- Label: Glassnote
- Producer: Rostam

Hamilton Leithauser chronology
Dear God (2015)	I Had a Dream That You Were Mine (2016)	The Loves of Your Life (2020)

Rostam chronology
I Had a Dream That You Were Mine (2016)	Half-Light (2017)

Singles from I Had a Dream That You Were Mine
- 1. "A 1000 Times" Released: July 22, 2016; 2. "In a Black Out" Released: August 5, 2016; 3. "When the Truth Is..." Released: August 26, 2016

I Had a Dream That You Were Mine is a collaborative studio album by Hamilton Leithauser, the former frontman of The Walkmen, and Rostam, the multi-instrumentalist and former producer of Vampire Weekend. It was released on September 23, 2016 on Glassnote Records, and preceded by the singles "A 1000 Times", "In a Black Out" and "When the Truth Is..."

After first meeting in 2008 while performing at the same show, the pair collaborated on two tracks for Leithauser's debut solo album, Black Hours (2014), before deciding to work together on a full-length. It was recorded between February 2014 and July 2016 at Rostam Batmanglij's home studio in Los Angeles, and released under both artists' names as a tribute to the collaborative albums between David Byrne and Brian Eno.

The album cover uses Bill Brandt's photograph titled "Portrait of a Young Girl, Eaton Place" from 1955.

== Background ==
Leithauser and Batmanglij met in 2008, when Vampire Weekend supported The Walkmen at a show. Both originally hailing from Washington D.C., they would meet up while visiting their respective families during the holiday season: "Two years in a row at Thanksgiving and Christmas we would be up in Rostam's high school bedroom. The first time we were out there, I was just wailing away and singing so loud, and then you heard this voice from the bottom of the stairs, and it’s Rostam's dad. He's yelling from downstairs, like, 'Rostam, are you OK?' It was like we were teenagers up there."

Prior to working together on I Had a Dream That You Were Mine, Leithauser and Batmanglij collaborated on the tracks, "Alexandra" and "I Retired", from Leithauser's debut solo album, Black Hours, released in 2014: "When we did those two songs that ended up on Black Hours, we both had this mutual feeling like there was some music that we’d always wanted to make and that when we were working together we were able to make that music." Before working on these songs, the duo had begun writing "1959", which would subsequently appear as the closing track on I Had a Dream That You Were Mine.

== Recording ==
I Had a Dream That You Were Mine was recorded between July 2014 and February 2016, with Leithauser staying with Batmanglij in Los Angeles for the recording sessions: "We’d do these week stretches of working together where Hamilton would come stay with me in LA, and we’d go into the studio and have these marathon work sessions." Already a fan of Leithauser's work with The Walkmen, Batmanglij found the recording sessions to be smooth as a result of his familiarity: "I'm a little wary of getting in the studio with people whose music I don’t know very well, because I feel it’s my duty as the producer to be familiar with pretty much everything they’ve put out. I think we found a sound pretty quickly that we could expand on."

Batmanglij's production blended contemporary recording techniques with previously established musical genres: "There’s a lot of synth and sub-bass, and we have drums that almost sound intentionally programmed in parts. And that shooby doo wop is something that Rostam added in — it’s like taking old elements and making new sounds out of it." The album's drum tracks were recorded by White Rabbits' Stephen Patterson in a separate studio. The use of saxophone on "Rough Going (I Won't Let Up)" was inspired by a dream Batmanglij had ten years previously: "I feel like when I was in college I was listening to The Walkmen a lot and I actually have a memory of having a dream and in the dream I saw The Walkmen perform with saxes. [...] So putting sax on the song, with Hamilton singing, was something I wanted to do for 10 years."

== Composition ==
The album features a variety of musical styles and vintage production influences, with Leithauser noting, "We both listen to tonnes of different stuff, but it seemed like we had this mutual interest in trying to capture a lot of sounds from the late 1950s and the early 1960s, like country music, doo-wop music, soul music and early rock n' roll music. It seemed like that was the sound pretty early, that that was becoming our sound." Many of the album's songs were written and recorded simultaneously while in the studio, with several first takes appearing on the finished recordings: "Right when we had the idea, we’d try it and record it right then. That’s why the songs have unusual structures, because you’d put the things together right then, and for some reason that allowed us to not come up with the traditional verse-chorus-verse-chorus songs. It seemed to take an unusual turn." The track '1000 Times' is based on the folk song 500 Miles.

An early version of "In a Blackout" was written by Leithauser for The Walkmen's seventh and final studio album, Heaven (2012): "I could never get the part sounding good where I was playing. It sort of didn’t make much sense in The Walkmen anyhow." Regarding the album's lyrical content, Leithauser noted that he often tried not to rewrite or overthink his words: "We tried to keep a lot of original takes and a lot of original moments, so it did feel like naturally it did have sort of a narrative, and it was almost like there was a character in it that went all the way through the record. [...] It did seem like there was a consistent voice that went through the whole thing, that’s inspired by the music." Batmanglij likened his lyrical contributions to the album to that of an editor: "I would contribute lyrics, but I think a lot of what I brought was sort of focusing a narrative and trying to make sure that there was always a picture being painted."

== Critical reception ==
Professional ratings
Aggregate scores
Source	Rating
AnyDecentMusic?	7.9/10
Metacritic	82/100
Review scores
Source	Rating
AllMusic	4/5 stars
Exclaim!	8/10
The Guardian	4/5 stars
Mojo	4/5 stars
NME	4/5
The Observer	3/5 stars
Pitchfork	8.3/10
Q	4/5 stars
Record Collector	4/5 stars
Uncut	8/10

I Had a Dream That You Were Mine received universal acclaim from music critics, receiving a score of 82 out of 100 on the review aggregator website Metacritic.

=== Accolades ===
Publication	Accolade	Year	Rank	Ref.
American Songwriter	Top 50 Albums of 2016	2016	37	
The A.V. Club	The A.V. Club's Top 50 Albums of 2016	2016	20	
Paste	The 50 Best Albums of 2016	2016	46	
Pitchfork	The 20 Best Rock Albums of 2016	2016	—N/a	
Pitchfork	The 50 Best Albums of 2016	2016	35	

== Track listing ==
All tracks are written by Hamilton Leithauser and Rostam Batmanglij.

No.	Title	Length
1.	"A 1000 Times"	4:08
2.	"Sick as a Dog"	4:33
3.	"Rough Going (I Won't Let Up)"	4:15
4.	"In a Black Out"	3:16
5.	"Peaceful Morning"	4:03
6.	"When the Truth Is..."	4:16
7.	"You Ain't That Young Kid"	5:04
8.	"The Bride's Dad"	2:23
9.	"The Morning Stars"	3:44
10.	"1959" (featuring Angel Deradoorian)	4:52
Total length:		40:34

== Personnel ==
- Rostam Batmanglij - Art Direction, Backwards Vocals, Banjo, Bass (Electric), Bass Programming, Celeste, Composer, Drum Programming, Drums, Engineer, Guitar (Acoustic), Guitar (Electric), Handwriting, Harpsichord, Horn Arrangements, Inside Photo, Mixing, Organ, Organ (Hammond), Piano, Producer, Programming, Sampling, Slide Guitar, String Arrangements, Synthesizer, Synthesizer Strings, Toms, Vocals, Vocals (Background)
- Zal Batmanglij - Back Cover Photo, Inside Photo
- Hamilton Berry - Cello
- Bill Brandt - Cover Packaging
- Jonathan Chu - Violin
- John Debold - Engineer
- Angel Deradoorian - Featured Artist, Vocals
- Kevin Farzad - Drums
- Justin Gerrish - Engineer
- Michael Harris - Engineer
- Greg Leisz - Pedal Steel
- Georgiana Leithauser - Inside Photo
- Hamilton Leithauser - Art Direction, Bass (Electric), Composer, Engineer, Guitar (Acoustic), Guitar (Electric), Guitar (Nylon String), Guitar (Steel), Horn Arrangements, Inside Photo, Primary Artist, Slide Guitar, Toms, Vocals, Vocals (Background)
- Joe Santa Maria - Saxophone
- Wes Miles - Vocals (Background)
- Steve Patterson - Drums
- Nick Rowe - Engineer
- Anna Stumpf - Inside Photo
- Max Wang - Inside Photo

== Charts ==
Chart (2016)	Peak position
US Billboard 200	141
