= Half-Light (album) =

Studio album by Rostam
- Released: September 15, 2017
- Genres: Art pop; indie rock; indietronica
- Length: 52:08
- Label: Nonesuch
- Producers: Rostam Batmanglij; Ariel Rechtshaid; Francis Farewell Starlite

Rostam chronology
I Had a Dream That You Were Mine (2016)	Half-Light (2017)	Changephobia (2021)

Singles from Half-Light
- 1. "Wood" Released: September 27, 2011; 2. "Don't Let It Get to You" Released: November 1, 2011; 3. "EOS" Released: January 14, 2016; 4. "Gwan" Released: April 26, 2017; 5. "Bike Dream" Released: June 14, 2017; 6. "Half-Light" Released: September 8, 2017

Professional ratings
Aggregate scores
Source	Rating
AnyDecentMusic?	7.3/10
Metacritic	77/100
Review scores
Source	Rating
AllMusic	4/5 stars
The A.V. Club	B+
Consequence of Sound	B+
Exclaim!	7/10
NME	3/5 stars
Paste	7.4/10
Pitchfork	7.2/10
Q	4/5 stars
Rolling Stone	4/5 stars
Uncut	6/10

Half-Light is the debut solo studio album by American musician Rostam, released on September 15, 2017. The album peaked at #6 on the Billboard Heatseekers chart, and received generally favorable reviews.

== Background ==
Half-Light was released a year after his departure from his acclaimed indie-pop band, Vampire Weekend, and his successful collaboration with the former The Walkmen singer, Hamilton Leithauser, I Had a Dream That You Were Mine. The album contains several tracks that were written many years before the release of Half-Light, with one song being written ten years prior to the album's release.

== Track listing ==
All tracks written and produced by Rostam Batmanglij, except where noted.

Half-Light
No.	Title	Writer(s)	Additional production	Length
1.	"Sumer"		Ariel Rechtshaid	3:36
2.	"Bike Dream"		Rechtshaid	3:22
3.	"Half-Light" (featuring Kelly Zutrau)	Batmanglij; Ramesh Srivastava; Kelly Zutrau		3:31
4.	"Thatch Snow"			3:04
5.	"Wood"			5:42
6.	"Never Going to Catch Me"			3:10
7.	"Don't Let It Get to You"			5:18
8.	"I Will See You Again"			1:16
9.	"Hold You" (featuring Angel Deradoorian)	Batmanglij; Andrew Wyatt; Angel Deradoorian	Francis Farewell Starlite	2:34
10.	"When"		Rechtshaid	3:26
11.	"Rudy"		Rechtshaid	3:53
12.	"Warning Intruders"		Rechtshaid	3:31
13.	"EOS"			3:08
14.	"Gwan"	Batmanglij; Srivastava^{[a]}		4:46
15.	"Don't Let It Get to You" (Reprise)	Batmanglij; Paul Simon		2:01
Total length:				52:08

Vinyl edition (bonus tracks)
No.	Title	Length
16.	"Welcoming the Betrayers"	2:35
17.	"Another Room"	3:28
18.	"Oh You've Got To"	3:07
19.	"Arc"	1:20
Total length:		62:38

Notes

- ^{^[a]} signifies a lyricist.

Sample credits

- "Sumer" contains samples from "Sumer Is Icumen In" performed by The Revels Chorus.
- "Never Going To Catch Me" contains an interpolation of "Ndini Baba" by Dumisani Maraire.
- "Don't Let It Get To You" contains a sample from "The Obvious Child" as performed by Paul Simon.
- "When" contains excerpts from "You Are All I See" by Active Child.

== Personnel ==
Musicians

- Rostam Batmanglij – vocals (all tracks), drum programming (tracks 1, 2, 5–13), piano (tracks 2–4, 6, 8, 9, 11, 12, 14, 15), synth (tracks 4, 6–10, 12, 13, 15), sampler (tracks 1, 5–7, 9, 10, 15), drums (tracks 1, 3–5, 11), acoustic guitar (tracks 1, 3, 8, 14), string arrangement (tracks 2, 5, 6, 14), electric guitar (tracks 2, 3, 11), bass (tracks 3, 11, 14), harpsichord (track 1), glasser (track 1), shaker (track 3), 12-string guitar (track 5), hand drums (track 5), double bass (track 6), harmonizer (track 9), horn arrangement (track 11), slide guitar (track 14)
- Cameron Mesirow – backup vocals (track 1)
- Garrett Ray – drums (track 2)
- Hamilton Berry – cello (tracks 2, 5, 6, 14)
- Tony Flynt – double bass (track 2)
- Kelly Zutrau – vocals (track 3)
- Nick Rowe – hand claps (track 4), lap slaps (track 4)
- Jonathan Chu – violin (track 5)
- Max Wang – double bass (track 6)
- Andrew Bulbrook – violin (track 6)
- Angel Deradoorian – vocals (track 9), choir vocals (track 12)
- Abhiman Kaushal – tabla (track 10)
- Binki Shaprio – background vocals (track 11)
- Adam Schatz – saxophone (track 11)
- Joe Santa Maria – saxophone (track 11)

Production

- Rostam Batmanglij – production, mixing (tracks 1, 3–13, 15), engineering (tracks 2, 5–7, 10, 11, 13, 14); design and layout, front cover Polaroid digital pixelation
- Ariel Rechtshaid – additional production (tracks 1, 2, 10–12), engineering (tracks 1, 2, 5, 6, 10)
- Francis Farewell Starlite – additional production (track 9)
- Dave Fridmann – mixing (track 2)
- Rob Orton – mixing (track 4)
- Emily Lazar – mastering
- Chris Allgood – mastering assistance
- Nick Rowe – engineering (tracks 1–4, 6, 8, 9, 12, 14)
- Shane Stoneback – engineering (tracks 1–4, 6, 9–14)
- Chris Rakestraw – engineering (track 1)
- Justin Gerrish – engineering (track 1)
- Michael Harris – engineering (tracks 2, 10, 11)
- John DeBold – engineering (track 9)
- Chris Kasych – engineering (track 10)
- Logan Patrick – engineering (track 11)
- Dave Schiffman – engineering (track 14)
- Ben Tousley – design and layout
- Ezra Koenig – front cover Polaroid
- Jake Longstreth – back cover painting

== Charts ==
Chart (2017)	Peak position
US Heatseekers Albums (Billboard)	6
