= Ya Hey =

Single by Vampire Weekend

from the album Modern Vampires of the City
- Released: May 3, 2013
- Genre: Indie pop
- Length: 5:12
- Label: XL
- Composers: Rostam Batmanglij; Ezra Koenig; Ariel Rechtshaid (bass line of bridge section)
- Lyricist: Ezra Koenig
- Producers: Rostam Batmanglij; Ariel Rechtshaid

Vampire Weekend singles chronology
"Diane Young" / "Step" (2013)	"Ya Hey" (2013)	"Unbelievers" (2013)

Lyric video
- "Ya Hey" on YouTube

"Ya Hey" is a song by American indie pop band Vampire Weekend, taken from their third studio album Modern Vampires of the City. It was released as the second single from the album on May 3, 2013 through XL Recordings. An official music video of the single, featuring the lyrics, was uploaded on May 3, 2013.

== Critical reception ==
"Ya Hey" received very positive reviews from critics. Ian Cohen of Pitchfork described the song as "a staggering duality of childish innocence and poetic confidence" and an "impossibly catchy song that skips along while carrying the weight of the universe" and awarded it Best New Track. Robert Leedham of Drowned in Sound praised the new directness of the lyrics compared to Vampire Weekend's earlier songs, saying, "Rather than dropping oblique reference points at every turn, Koenig adopts a magnificently blasphemous posture from start to finish." Musically, Leedham described the song as a "euphoric cocktail" and praised its "righteous swirl of drums, bass, plaintive piano, shrill vocoder and gospel chanting." Pretty Much Amazing also compared the song favorably to the band's earlier work, arguing that, "unlike the absurdly catchy, frivolous 'ay ay ay's of "A-Punk", the 'ya-heys' of 'Ya Hey' are filled with meaning," and called the song "a brilliant stomp-along anthem." The A.V. Club called "Ya Hey" "not the album's strongest song, but the one probably most destined to be talked about...In a way, "Ya Hey" feels like a bridge for whatever might be coming next for Vampire Weekend."

== Personnel ==
Vampire Weekend

- Chris Baio – bass
- Rostam Batmanglij – piano, guitars, banjo, vocal harmonies and backing vocals, drum and synth programming, keyboards, shaker
- Ezra Koenig – lead vocals
- Chris Tomson – drums

Technical

- Rich Costey – mixing
- Chris Kasych – mix assistance, Pro Tools engineering
- Eric Isip – assistance
- Emily Lazar – mastering
- Joe LaPorta – mastering

== Charts ==
Chart performance for "Ya Hey"
Chart (2013)	Peak position
Mexico Ingles Airplay (Billboard)	34
