= Step (Vampire Weekend song) =

Single by Vampire Weekend

from the album Modern Vampires of the City
- A-side: "Diane Young"
- Released: March 19, 2013
- Genre: Indie pop; baroque pop
- Length: 4:11
- Label: XL
- Composers: Rostam Batmanglij; Ezra Koenig (Note: Contains elements from "Aubrey" by David Gates and interpolates YZ's "Who's That Girl" in its hook, "every time I see you in the world you always step to my girl".)
- Lyricist: Ezra Koenig
- Producers: Rostam Batmanglij; Ariel Rechtshaid

Vampire Weekend singles chronology
"Run" (2010)	"Diane Young" / "Step" (2013)	"Ya Hey" (2013)

Lyric video
- "Step" on YouTube

"Step" is a song by American indie rock band Vampire Weekend. Written and composed by band members Ezra Koenig and Rostam Batmanglij and produced by Ariel Rechtshaid and Batmanglij, the song was released as the fourth and final single from the band's third studio album Modern Vampires of the City. The song was inspired by American hip hop group Souls of Mischief's song "Step to My Girl".

== Composition ==
The lyrics and other elements of "Step" were inspired by the song "Step to My Girl" which was recorded as a demo by the Oakland-based hip-hop group Souls of Mischief. The hip-hop group was contacted by Vampire Weekend's legal team to sample and use one of the lines from "Step to My Girl". One of the members of Vampire Weekend also spoke directly to Souls of Mischief about the song's sample.

When Souls of Mischief member Tajai finally heard "Step" after it was completed, he expressed his approval stating that "it was so good; I was just happy we were able to be part of that."

The Souls of Mischief song "Step to My Girl" samples Grover Washington Jr.'s saxophone cover of Bread's 1973 single "Aubrey", therefore David Gates, founder of Bread and songwriter of "Aubrey", is credited as a songwriter of "Step". The song also contains lyrical references to the musician Jandek and the band Modest Mouse.

== Release ==
"Step" was initially released as a double A-side single with "Diane Young" on March 18, 2013, with both songs being promoted as the lead singles taken from the band's third studio album Modern Vampires of the City. "Step" premiered with "Diane Young" on Zane Lowe's BBC Radio 1 show in the UK.

== Remix ==
Vampire Weekend composed a remix of "Step", featuring guest verses from American rappers Danny Brown, Heems and Despot. The remix was released December 31, 2013.

== Commercial performance ==
"Step" peaked at number 35 on the Billboard Alternative Songs chart. The single also reached number 170 in France. It also peaked at number 54 on the Ultratip charts in the Flanders region of Belgium.

== Critical reception ==
"Step" is widely regarded as one of the band's best songs. Paste and Far Out ranked the song number four and number eight, respectively, on their lists of the greatest Vampire Weekend songs.

== Music video ==
The lyric video to "Step" was uploaded on March 18, 2013 on YouTube and VEVO. The background of the video shows various shots of New York City with the lyrics being shown over the top.

== Personnel ==
Vampire Weekend

- Chris Baio – bass
- Rostam Batmanglij – piano, guitars, banjo, vocal harmonies and backing vocals, drum and synth programming, keyboards, shaker
- Ezra Koenig – lead vocals
- Chris Tomson – drums

Technical

- Rich Costey – mixing
- Chris Kasych – mix assistance, Pro Tools engineering
- Eric Isip – assistance
- Emily Lazar – mastering
- Joe LaPorta – mastering

== Charts ==
Chart (2013–2014)	Peak position
Belgium (Ultratip Bubbling Under Flanders)	4
France (SNEP)	170
Mexico Ingles Airplay (Billboard)	45
US Alternative Airplay (Billboard)	35

== Certifications ==
Region	Certification	Certified units/sales
Canada (Music Canada)	Gold	40,000^{‡}
^{‡} Sales+streaming figures based on certification alone.
