= I Don't Need Anyone =

I Don't Need Anyone may refer to:

- "I Don't Need Anyone", song by Hamilton Leithauser from Black Hours
- "I Don’t Need Anyone", song by soulDecision from No One Does It Better
- "I Don't Need Anyone", song by Kylie Minogue from Impossible Princess
