= Unbelievers (song) =

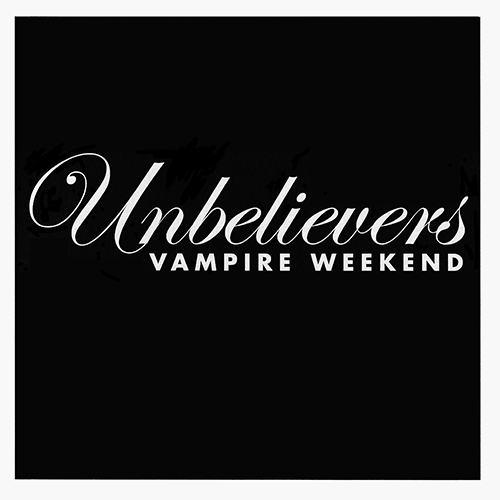

Single by Vampire Weekend

from the album Modern Vampires of the City
- Released: August 12, 2013
- Length: 3:22
- Label: XL
- Composers: Rostam Batmanglij; Ezra Koenig
- Lyricist: Ezra Koenig
- Producers: Rostam Batmanglij; Ariel Rechtshaid

Vampire Weekend singles chronology
"Ya Hey" (2013)	"Unbelievers" (2013)	"Harmony Hall" / "2021" (2019)

Audio video
- "Unbelievers" on YouTube

"Unbelievers" is a song by American indie pop band Vampire Weekend. Written by the band's lead singer Ezra Koenig and multi-instrumentalist Rostam Batmanglij, and produced by Ariel Rechtshaid and Batmanglij, the song was released as the third single from their third studio album Modern Vampires of the City in August 2013. The band initially premiered "Unbelievers" in a live performance on Jimmy Kimmel Live on October 31, 2012. They also performed the song live on an episode of Saturday Night Live prior to it being released as a single.

== Commercial performance ==
The song peaked at number seven on the Billboard Alternative Songs chart, becoming the band's first top ten hit on the chart, and has also peaked at number 24 on the Billboard Hot Rock Songs chart and number 158 on the UK Singles Chart.

== Personnel ==
Vampire Weekend

- Chris Baio – bass
- Rostam Batmanglij – piano, guitars, banjo, vocal harmonies and backing vocals, drum and synth programming, keyboards, shaker
- Ezra Koenig – lead vocals, piano
- Chris Tomson – drums

Additional musicians

- Johnny Bravo – flistle
- Brendan Ryan – accordion
- Elizabeth Lea – trombone
- Danny T. Levin – trumpet
- Seth Shafer – tuba
- Ariel Rechtshaid – additional drum and synth programming

Technical

- Scott Jacoby – mixing
- Emily Lazar – mixing, mastering
- Joe LaPorta – mastering

== Charts ==
=== Weekly charts ===
Chart (2013–14)	Peak position
Belgium (Ultratip Bubbling Under Flanders)	20
Canada Rock (Billboard)	21
Mexico Ingles Airplay (Billboard)	19
UK Singles (Official Charts Company)	158
US Hot Rock & Alternative Songs (Billboard)	24
US Rock & Alternative Airplay (Billboard)	7
US Adult Alternative Airplay (Billboard)	6
US Alternative Airplay (Billboard)	7

=== Year-end charts ===
Chart (2013)	Position
US Adult Alternative Songs (Billboard)	30

Chart (2014)	Position
US Hot Rock Songs (Billboard)	51
US Rock Airplay (Billboard)	28
US Alternative Songs (Billboard)	27

== Certifications ==
Region	Certification	Certified units/sales
Canada (Music Canada)	Gold	40,000^{‡}
^{‡} Sales+streaming figures based on certification alone.
