= Discovery (band) =

American indie electronic recording project

- Origin: New York City, New York, U.S.
- Genres: Indietronica; futurepop; indie rock; indie pop; synth-pop; electro-funk; funk rock
- Years active: 2005–2009
- Label: XL Recordings
- Members: Rostam Batmanglij; Wesley Miles
- Website: dscvry.net

Discovery is an American indie electronic recording project of Rostam Batmanglij and Wesley Miles, friends who began recording together in the summer of 2005.

== History ==
Before Batmanglij and Miles found success in the indie rock scene with Vampire Weekend and Ra Ra Riot, respectively, they recorded as the synth-pop duo Discovery in 2005. Their music drew from the sounds of synth-pop and auto-tuned R&B. As Discovery, Batmanglij and Miles began recording an album together in 2006, but the project was left unfinished as Vampire Weekend and Ra Ra Riot began to find chart success. After the release of the debut albums for both Vampire Weekend and Ra Ra Riot, Batmanglij and Miles returned to the studio to complete Discovery's debut album, LP, released in 2009.

== Members ==
- Rostam Batmanglij
- Wes Miles

== Discography ==
- LP (July 7, 2009)
