= Changephobia =

- Cover to the standard edition; the deluxe edition replace the black bars with yellow

Studio album by Rostam Batmanglij
- Released: June 4, 2021
- Studios: Electro-Vox Studio, Los Angeles, California, US; Matsor Projects, Los Angeles, California, US
- Length: 38:10
- Label: Matsor Projects
- Producer: Rostam Batmanglij

Rostam Batmanglij chronology
| Half-Light (2017) | Changephobia (2021) | The Persian Version (2023) |

"I definitely wanted to shed the skin of some of those hallmarks that I had come to be known for over the years. I got to the point where I could no longer make any more music that relied on classical music as an inspiration. That may change in the future, but I got to a point where I just said, 'The next thing has to come from a different place'."

— Rostam Batmanglij on changing his songwriting process for Changephobia

Changephobia is the second full-length solo album by American indie rock musician Rostam Batmanglij. The album has received positive reception from critics and appeared on several best-of lists for the year. It was followed by two volumes of remixes later in the year.

== Reception ==
Editors at AnyDecentMusic? scored this album a 7.3 out of 10, based on 15 reviews. According to the review aggregator Metacritic, Changephobia received "generally favorable reviews" based on a weighted average score of 76 out of 100 from 14 critic scores.

Professional ratings
Aggregate scores
| Source | Rating |
|---|---|
| Metacritic | 76/100 |
Review scores
| Source | Rating |
| AnyDecentMusic? | 7.3/10 |
| The A.V. Club | B+ |
| AllMusic | 4/5 |
| DIY | 4/5 |
| Dork | 3/5 |
| Exclaim! | 8/10 |
| Mojo | 4/5 |
| Pitchfork | 7.2/10 |

At The A.V. Club, Tatiana Tenreyro scored this album a B+, calling it "a fitting record for sunny summer days, leaning into a stripped-down sound that combines pop with jazz". Editors at AllMusic rated this album 4 out of 5 stars, with critic Heather Phares writing "on Changephobia, [Batmanglij's] approach is a little more concise and considered" than 2017's Half-Light "but just as evocative", continuing that his music is "more artful and heartfelt than ever". DIY's Sean Kerwick scored Changephobia 4 out of 5 stars, characterizing it as "beautifully constructed, surprising and brimming with invention". Writing for Dork, Jamie Macmillan gave this album 3 out of 5 stars, writing that "though there are delightful moments popping up every now and then, everything feels just a little too light and struggles to really take hold in your memory, it's relentless insistence on skipping onto the next thing making everything feel just that bit too fleeting". In Exclaim!, Ian Gormedy rated this release 8 out of 10, summing up, "it's the most coherent vision—lyrically and sonically—of Rostam as a solo artist so far".

Oliver Kuscher of The Line of Best Fit gave this album an 8 out of 10, stating that "the record has a beautifully cohesive groove, the many disparate parts seamlessly fitting together in typical Rostam fashion". In Loud and Quiet, Rosie Ramsden rated Changephobia a 7 out of 10, stating that the album's strength lies in cohesion between different-sounding songs, summing up that "they are tied together by a melodic thread that inspires a change of pace that encourages us to pause and take stock of our lives and beliefs and relationships". Tom Doyle of Mojo rated this release 4 out of 5 stars for being "a quiet beauty" with vocals reminiscent of Paul Simon. Simone Fraser scored Changephobia 3 out of 5 stars, critiquing that "the multi-talented musician's downfall is sometimes that he wraps melodies in so many layers that it barely has a chance to breathe", while praising the album as "cohesive despite an experimental and genre-defying sound".

Max Freedman of Paste gave Changephobia a 6.8 out of 10, summing it up as Batmanglij's "most compact work yet, which is alternately a boon and a crutch". A 7.2 out of 10 came from Will Gottsegen of Pitchfork Media, who compared it to Haim's Women in Music Pt. III and praised "songs that locate their intoxicating highs in the restless spontaneity he writes about so frequently". Colin McGuire of PopMatters rated this album 7 out of 10 for being "an album that's as concise as it is provoking and as pleasant as it is interesting". A brief review in Rolling Stone praised the production on this album for making "pleasantly ornate pop with classical flourishes" and rated it 3 out of 5 stars. Writing for Slant Magazine, Eric Mason gave this release 3.5 out of 5 stars, ending "while Batmanglij has reduced the vast variety of sounds and distortion of his debut, the warmth of his vision remains". Uncut's Bud Scoppa wrote that in this music, "Rostam juxtaposes elements of the postmodern sonic recipe he helped dream up for Vampire Weekend with novel touches, forming the flexible framework for deeply personal emotions" and scored it 7 out of 10.

In a mid-year wrap-up of the 25 best albums of 2021, The A.V. Club's Gabrielle Sanchez stated that Batmanglij "steps firmly out of his former band's [Vampire Weekend] shadow... with a lush, romantic sophomore solo album". Mikael Wood of Los Angeles Times rated this the third best album of the year, comparing the sounds to Chet Baker and Charlie Parker. Sean Maunier also rated it number three for 2021, calling it as "ambitious and multifaceted as its creator" and "asks what it means to live in a world that is constantly turning itself upside down, and more pressingly, the joys and connections we manage to find with each other in the constant flux". Critic Lindsay Zoladz of The New York Times considered Changephobia a runner-up for the shortlist of the best albums of the year. A Pitchfork Media ranking of the 100 best songs of 2021 included "4Runner" at 80 and Peyton Thomas wrote that this "twelve-string tribute to the open road would make anyone swoon".

== Track listing ==
1. "These Kids We Knew" (Rostam Batmanglij) – 2:28
2. "From the Back of a Cab" (Batmanglij) – 2:47
3. "Unfold You" (Batmanglij, Nick Hakim, Wes Miles, and Cassia O'Reilly) – 3:54
4. "4Runner" (Batmanglij and Brad Oberhofer) – 3:49
5. "Changephobia" (Batmanglij) – 3:50
6. "Kinney" (Batmanglij) – 3:19
7. "Bio18" (Batmanglij and Ramesh Srivastava) – 4:01
8. "(Interlude)" (Batmanglij and Henry Solomon) – 1:59
9. "To Communicate" (Batmanglij) – 3:27
10. "Next Thing" (Batmanglij) – 4:30
11. "Starlight" (Batmanglij) – 4:06

Bonus tracks on the expanded edition

12. "Train in Vain (Stand by Me) (Mick Jones and Joe Strummer) – 3:28
13. "Fruits of My Labor" (Lucinda Williams) – 4:35

"Unfold You" contains a sample of "Papas Fritas" by Nick Hakim and "4Runner" contains a sample spoken word by Tess Brown-Lavoie.

== Personnel ==
- Rostam Batmanglij – 12-string guitar, acoustic guitar, electric guitar, piano, Hammond B3, Wurlitzer, Mellotron, Moog synthesizer, bass guitar, harmonica, drums, congas, shaker, tambourine, percussion, snapping, vocals, backing vocals, saxophone arrangement, drum programming, synthesizer programming, sampling, engineering, mixing, production
- Chris Allgood – mastering assistance
- Olivia Bee – photography
- Michael Blasky – tenor saxophone on "Kinney"
- Rich Costey – mixing on "4Runner"
- Tom Elmhirst – mixing on "These Kids We Knew", "From the Back of a Cab", "Unfold You", "Changephobia", "Kinney", "Bio18", and "Starlight"
- Dave Fridmann – mixing on "To Communicate"
- Danielle Haim – drums on "These Kids We Knew",
- Jack Hallenbeck – synthesizer on "These Kids We Knew", engineering on "These Kids We Knew" and "4Runner"
- Michael Harris – engineering on "Unfold You", "Changephobia", "Bio18", "To Communicate", "Next Thing", and "Starlight"
- Nate Head – congas on "Bio18", drums on "Next Thing"
- Christine Im – layout
- Emily Lazar – mastering at The Loft, New York City, New York, United States
- Julian McClanahan – backing vocals on "Changephobia"
- Joey Messina-Doerning – drums on "Changephobia", engineering
- Henry Solomon – baritone saxophone on "Unfold You", "Changephobia", "Kinney", "Bio18", "(Interlude)", "Next Thing", and "Starlight"; saxophone arrangement
- Shane Stoneback – engineering
- Gabriel Strum – synthesizer on "Starlight"

== See also ==
- 2021 in American music
- List of 2021 albums
