= This Side of the Island =

Studio album by Hamilton Leithauser
- Released: March 7, 2025
- Genre: Pop
- Length: 29:59
- Label: Glassnote
- Producer: Leithauser; Aaron Dessner; Anna Stumpf

Hamilton Leithauser chronology
| The Loves of Your Life (2020) | This Side of the Island (2025) |

Singles from This Side of the Island
- 1. "This Side of the Island" Released: December 10, 2024; 2. "Knockin’ Heart" Released: January 8, 2025

This Side of the Island is the fifth studio album by American musician Hamilton Leithauser. It was released on March 7, 2025, by Glassnote Records.

== Background ==
Leithauser's fourth solo album and his first since The Loves of Your Life in 2020, This Side of the Island consists of nine songs. Reflective of a beach side theme, the album centers on Leithauser's remembrance of a past relationship when he was younger, with the album title referring to Manhattan and Lower East Side. It was produced by Leithauser, Aaron Dessner and Leithauser's wife, Anna Stumpf. In December 2024, Leithauser published a post on Instagram about the title track, "This Side of the Island", noting it was the last song he wrote in eight years and describing its themes as disillusionment, acceptance, and resolve. The album's first and second singles, "This Side of the Island" and "Knockin’ Heart", were released on December 10, 2024, and January 8, 2025, respectively.

== Reception ==
Professional ratings
Review scores
| Source | Rating |
|---|---|
| AllMusic | 4.5/5 stars |
| Pitchfork | 7.3/10 |
| PopMatters | 8/10 |
| Under the Radar | 5.5/10 stars |
| MusicOMH | 3.5/5 stars |

Heather Phares of AllMusic wrote in her review of the album, "Hearing him revisit the louder side of his music on This Side of the Island is a real thrill, especially when he navigates it as skillfully as he does on the title track." Pitchfork's Zach Schonfeld gave it a rating of 7.3 out of 10, stating "The Walkmen frontman’s third solo album is scattershot and charming, full of beachside vignettes about doomed lovers and aimless wanderers." PopMatters rated the album eight out of ten and described it as capturing "sounds that Leithauser had not yet put to tape, combinations that arguably nobody has. All the hallmarks of the artist’s songcraft are there, including his striking vocals, catchy melodies, and powerful rhythmic cadence." Under the Radar wrote that "While the album’s shortcomings are undeniable, it’s not a complete misfire. This Side of the Island ‘s strength lies in its louder, faster moments," giving it a rating of 5.5 out of 10. The New York Times called the album "more frenetic and urgent" compared to Leithauser's previous albums. MusicOMH stated that "it is an album that, admittedly, feels a bit front-loaded at times: the sparkle and energy of the first few tracks aren’t present in songs like I Was Right for example." The A.V. Club noted the album as being "brighter and more pop-forward than anything he's done in the past."

== Track listing ==
| No. | Title | Length |
|---|---|---|
| 1. | "Fist of Flowers" | 3:13 |
| 2. | "Burn the Boats" | 3:28 |
| 3. | "Ocean Roar" | 3:36 |
| 4. | "Knockin' Heart" | 3:22 |
| 5. | "What Do I Think?" | 3:12 |
| 6. | "Off the Beach" | 2:45 |
| 7. | "I Was Right" | 3:19 |
| 8. | "Happy Lights" | 3:18 |
| 9. | "This Side of the Island" | 3:46 |
| Total length: | | 29:59 |
