= Beta Love =

Studio album by Ra Ra Riot
- Released: January 22, 2013
- Genres: Indie rock, indie pop, electronica, synth-pop
- Length: 30:15
- Label: Barsuk
- Producer: Dennis Herring

Ra Ra Riot chronology
The Orchard (2010)	Beta Love (2013)	Need Your Light (2016)

Beta Love is the third studio album of the Syracuse-based indie rock band Ra Ra Riot. It is the first album since the departure of founding member/cellist, Alexandra Lawn, who left the band in 2012. Band members have stated that the album is directly influenced by sci-fi author William Gibson and inventor-futurist Ray Kurzweil.

Professional ratings
Aggregate scores
Source	Rating
Metacritic	59/100
Review scores
Source	Rating
AllMusic	4.5/5 stars
Pitchfork	(5.2/10)
Sputnikmusic	(2.3/5)
The A.V. Club	C−

== Track listing ==
All tracks are written by Ra Ra Riot (Wes Miles, Mathieu Santos, Milo Bonacci, Rebecca Zeller).

No.	Title	Length
1.	"Dance with Me"	2:24
2.	"Binary Mind"	3:13
3.	"Beta Love"	2:56
4.	"Is It Too Much"	2:40
5.	"For Once"	2:29
6.	"Angel, Please"	2:46
7.	"What I Do for U"	1:44
8.	"When I Dream"	3:06
9.	"That Much"	2:42
10.	"Wilderness"	3:09
11.	"I Shut Off"	3:10

=== Videos ===
- "Beta Love": Directed and Edited by David Dean Burkhart
- "Dance With Me": Directed by Christopher Mills
- "Binary Mind": Directed by Cole Hannan

== Personnel ==
=== Ra Ra Riot ===
- Wes Miles - vocals, keyboards
- Mathieu Santos - bass
- Milo Bonacci - guitar, keyboards
- Rebecca Zeller - violin

=== Additional personnel ===
- Will Cole - engineering
- Dennis Herring - mixing, production
- Drew Vandenberg - engineering, mixing
- Howie Weinberg - mastering engineer
