= The Rhumb Line =

Studio album by Ra Ra Riot
- Released: August 19, 2008
- Recorded: Bear Creek Studio, Seattle (December, 2007)
- Genre: Indie rock, indie pop
- Length: 36:58
- Label: Barsuk
- Producer: Ryan Hadlock

Ra Ra Riot chronology
Ra Ra Riot (2007)	The Rhumb Line (2008)	The Orchard (2010)

Professional ratings
Aggregate scores
Source	Rating
Metacritic	75/100
Review scores
Source	Rating
Allmusic	4/5 stars
Drowned In Sound	(8/10)
Entertainment Weekly	(A−)
musicOMH	4.5/5 stars
Pitchfork Media	(7.5/10)
Rolling Stone	4/5 stars

The Rhumb Line is the debut LP for the Syracuse-based indie rock band Ra Ra Riot. Recorded in late 2007 with Ryan Hadlock in Woodinville, WA, the band released their debut album on August 19, 2008, through Seattle-based indie label Barsuk Records. The album peaked at #109 on the Billboard 200. This album was ranked as the 38th best album of 2008 by Rolling Stone.

== Songs ==
The track listing includes the Kate Bush cover "Suspended in Gaffa". Other songs, "Ghost Under Rocks", "Each Year", "Dying Is Fine", and "Can You Tell", previously appeared on the band's 2007 self-titled EP. Also, during a WOXY.com Lounge Act session (January 30, 2008), the band showcased "Too Too Too Fast", "Oh, La", and "Run My Mouth". Several of the songs contained in the album are literary references such as "Each Year" which appears to be written about Harper Lee's To Kill a Mockingbird and "Dying Is Fine" using the poem by E. E. Cummings. "St. Peter's Day Festival" commemorates the loss of bandmate John Pike, who went missing in June 2007 but was later found dead in Buzzard's Bay. The album was named after The Rhumb Line, a bar in Gloucester, Massachusetts that is referenced in the lyrics of "St. Peter's Day Festival".

== Track listing ==
All tracks written by Ra Ra Riot (Wes Miles, Mathieu Santos, Milo Bonacci, Alexandra Lawn, Rebecca Zeller), except where noted.

1. "Ghost Under Rocks" (John Pike, Ra Ra Riot) – 4:26
2. "Each Year" (John Pike, Ra Ra Riot) – 3:16
3. "St. Peter's Day Festival" (John Pike, Wes Miles) – 3:34
4. "Winter '05" – 2:57
5. "Dying Is Fine" (John Pike, Wes Miles, E. E. Cummings) – 3:52
6. "Can You Tell" – 2:42
7. "Too Too Too Fast" (John Pike, Ra Ra Riot) – 3:46
8. "Oh, La" – 4:42
9. "Suspended in Gaffa" (Kate Bush) – 3:48
10. "Run My Mouth" – 3:58.

=== Videos ===
- "Dying Is Fine" on YouTube: Directed by Albert Birney, Nicholas Gurewitch, and Jon Moses.
- "Ghost Under Rocks": Directed by Brian Savelson.
- "Can You Tell": Directed by Taryn Gould and Emily Kowalczyk.

== Personnel ==
- Wes Miles – vocals, keyboards
- Mathieu Santos – bass guitar
- Milo Bonacci – guitar
- Rebecca Zeller – violin
- Alexandra Lawn – cello
- Cameron Wisch – drums
