= Modern Vampires of the City =

Studio album by Vampire Weekend
- Released: May 14, 2013
- Recorded: 2012–2013
- Studios: Rostam Batmanglij's apartment; Downtown (New York); Slow Death (Burbank); Vox; Echo Park Back House (Los Angeles)
- Genres: Indie rock; art pop; chamber pop
- Length: 42:54
- Label: XL
- Producers: Rostam Batmanglij; Ariel Rechtshaid

Vampire Weekend chronology
Contra (2010)	Modern Vampires of the City (2013)	Father of the Bride (2019)

Singles from Modern Vampires of the City
- 1. "Diane Young" / "Step" Released: March 19, 2013; 2. "Ya Hey" Released: May 3, 2013; 3. "Unbelievers" Released: August 12, 2013

Modern Vampires of the City is the third studio album by American indie rock band Vampire Weekend, released on May 14, 2013, by XL Recordings. The group began to write songs for the album during soundchecks on the supporting concert tour for their previous album, 2010's Contra. After a period in which each member explored individual musical projects, they regrouped and continued working on Modern Vampires of the City in 2011. With no deadline in mind, the band brought in an outside record producer for the first time, Ariel Rechtshaid, to record the album.

With Modern Vampires of the City, Vampire Weekend attempted to depart from the African-influenced indie pop style of their previous records. Broadly experimental, the album's sound was the result of a variety of unconventional recording assets, including pitch shifting. Subjects explored on the record include characters with adult responsibilities, reflections on growing old, mortality, and religious faith. Vampire Weekend titled the album after a lyric in the 1990 Junior Reid song "One Blood" and chose a Neal Boenzi photograph of the 1966 New York City smog event as the album cover, citing the haunting qualities of both the title and photograph as the reason for using them.

Modern Vampires of the City debuted at number one on the Billboard 200, becoming Vampire Weekend's second consecutive number-one album in the United States. By December 2014, the album had sold 505,000 copies in the US. It was also a widespread critical success and was ranked by several publications as 2013's best album, while finishing second in the annual Pazz & Jop critics poll. It has since been ranked on many lists of the best albums from the 2010s. In 2020, the album was ranked at number 328 on Rolling Stone's list of the "500 Greatest Albums of All Time", keeping this position on the 2023 update of the list.

== Background ==
The success of Vampire Weekend's second album, Contra (2010), established the group as "one of the past decade's great indie-rock success stories." By the time their world tour for Contra ended, the band realized they had not taken a break in nearly five years. During the break, each member pursued individual projects: Baio performed DJ sets and scored the Bob Byington film Somebody Up There Likes Me, Batmanglij recorded solo material and produced tracks for Das Racist and spent time traveling India with three friends, and Koenig collaborated with Major Lazer. Koenig had broken up with his girlfriend shortly before the release of Contra and subsequently moved out of their shared apartment in New York. Feeling "weird and aimless", Koenig attempted to stay in Los Angeles but he returned to New York after four months.

== Writing and recording ==
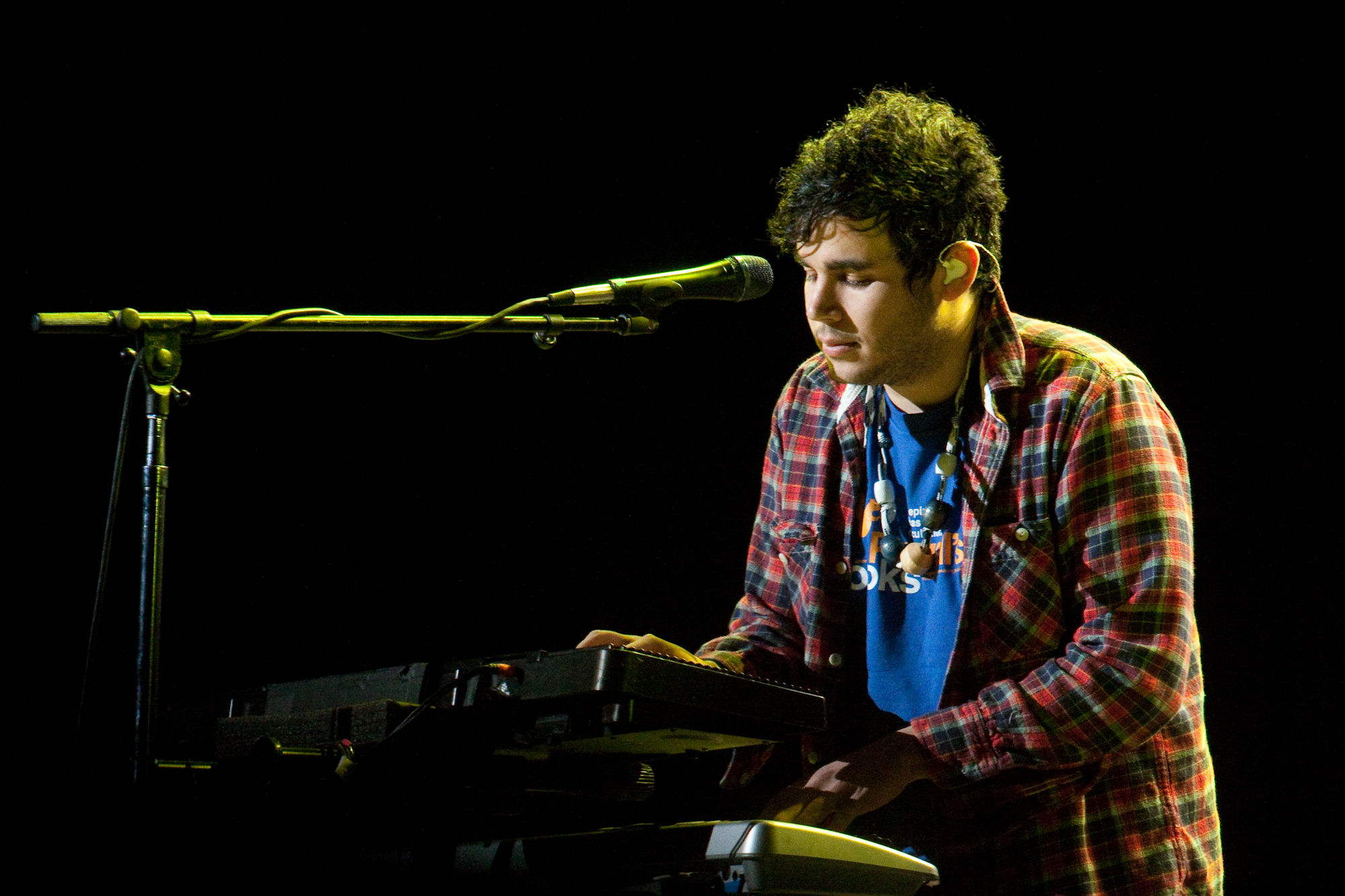
Rostam Batmanglij, the band's multi-instrumentalist and producer

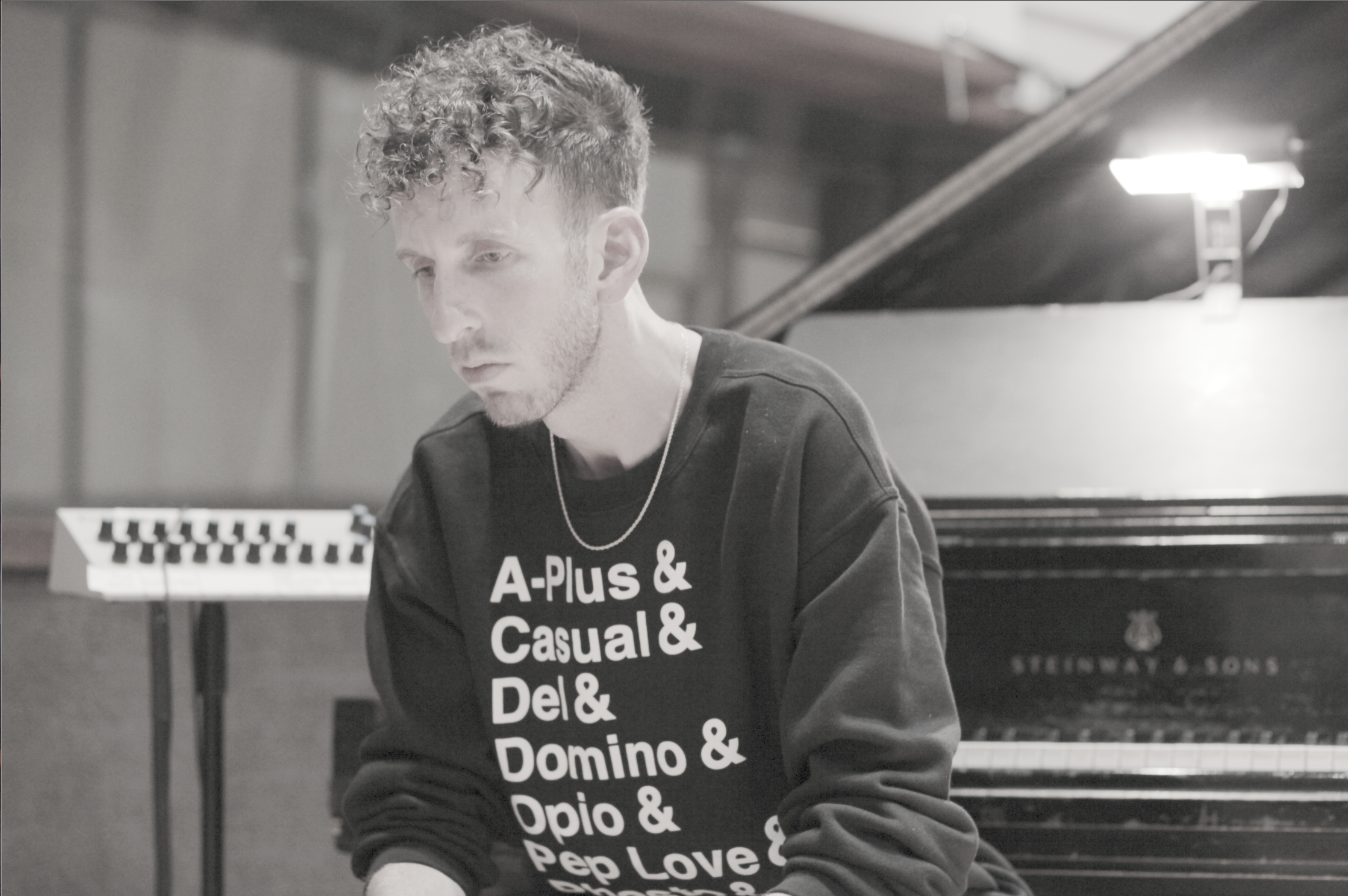
Ariel Rechtshaid, the album's co-producer

Batmanglij and Koenig wrote most of the songs in Batmanglij's apartment, a former factory building in Brooklyn. By the time Vampire Weekend eventually regrouped in 2011, the band members had amassed plenty of written material and made sure to take their time making a new record. Koenig and Batmanglij met several times a week to write songs, some of which they'd later scrap. The pair also took a "writing retreat" to Martha's Vineyard, where they bore down and composed several new tracks at a rented cottage. Working with no deadline in mind, the group began recording Modern Vampires of the City.

The songs for Modern Vampires of the City were recorded at several locations, including Downtown Studios in New York City, Echo Park Back House and Vox Studios in Los Angeles, Slow Death Studios in Burbank, and the apartment of Rostam Batmanglij, Vampire Weekend's multi-instrumentalist and producer. Early drafts of the tracks "Obvious Bicycle" and "Worship You" were produced at OK Go frontman, Damian Kulash's old house in Chicago, before being taken to an official studio to work on. Batmanglij and Ariel Rechtshaid, the album's co-producer, used a pair of mirrored solid state MacBooks with UAD-2 Satellite Firewire Cards so they could take their recordings anywhere and work on them from separate locations with maximum ease.

Modern Vampires of the City was an attempt by Vampire Weekend to distance themselves from the sounds featured on their debut record and Contra. "Whenever we came up with something familiar sounding, it was rejected", said Rechtshaid. The band credits Vox Studios with the defining special quality of the recordings, especially the use of their vintage analog tape machines, with Batmanglij remarking, "Much of the overall sound and approach to the album was being able to record the drums to tape on an old Ampex machine." The group wanted a unique drum sound, and so they recorded in a room with high ceilings and had engineer David Schiffman use a "pretty non-conventional drum miking setup" in which a pair of Neumann U 47s were used as over head mics with RCA 77dx ribbon mics between the Neumanns and the drum kit for added texture. Tape recordings of the drums were then heavily treated and manipulated with Ableton Live plug-ins. Lastly, the band layered samples onto select portions of the drum recordings to accent or shape the finished tone.

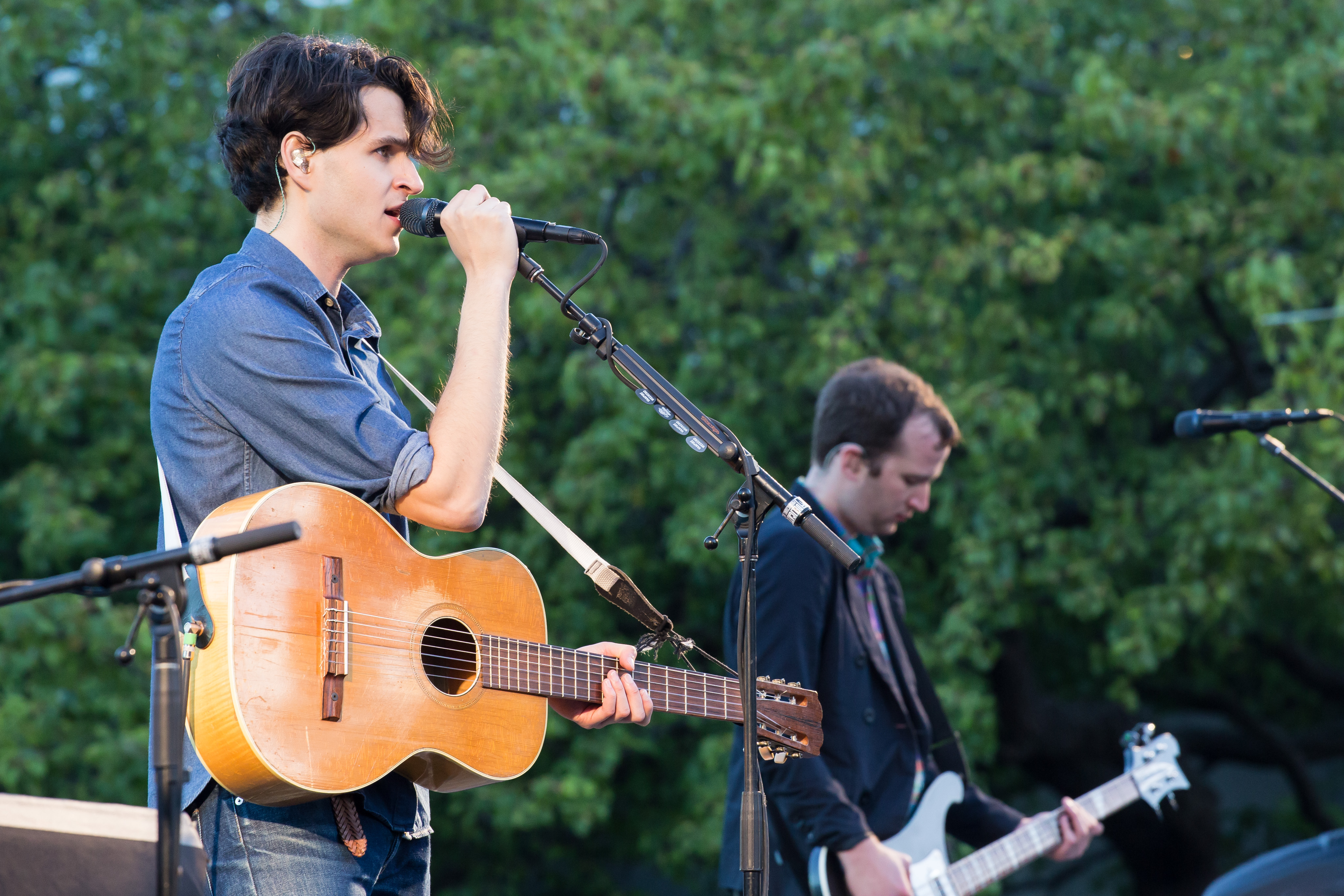
Lead vocalist-guitarist Ezra Koenig and bassist Chris Baio

Pitch shifting proved a major component of recording the album. For tracks such as "Step", drums were recorded on a Varispeed Tape deck set to a lower speed so that they would play back faster and more high pitched. Drummer Chris Tomson would then re-record the drums playing to the sped-up recording to get an uptempo live take. This second recording was then slowed back down to original speed to create an "underwater" effect. The effect is featured prominently on vocals as well. Ezra Koenig's vocals were run through Eventide H949 and 910 on tracks such as "Diane Young", with both the pitch and formant shifted changed to manipulate the sound of recorded vocals. Bass guitar was also recorded straight to tape "with a fairly ambient miking approach where the mic was three feet away from the cabinet". Vocals were recorded with Soundelux U99 Microphones, in combination with 1176 Classic limiter plug-in, Fairchild 670 Compressor and Elektro-Mess-Technik 140 Plate Reverb, giving the vocals a quality Batmanglij described as "buttery". For guitar sounds, Batmanglij chose not to mic his guitar and instead plugged his Gibson Les Paul direct-in to Pro Tools through a SansAmp Amp Emulation Pedal, a technique used by Jimmy Page.

Vampire Weekend concentrated their efforts on giving each recording "warmth", feeling that modern digital recordings lacked the sound quality of older records. In an attempt to make the tracks sound less harsh, the band and their recording engineers used a spectrum analyzer, Sonnox SuprEsser and heavily automated EQs to edit out harsher, colder frequencies and soften the mix. Vampire Weekend painstakingly listened to the record several separate times using technology from standard commercial iPod earbuds to professional equipment to ensure the record sounded nice regardless of equipment the listener owned. Desiring to "check the relative warmth levels", the engineers would "go in and perform surgery and automate EQs" in order to make the mixes listenable. The band felt the finished product was something of a third chapter and a continuation of material explored in their previous two efforts. "We thought these three albums should look like they belong together on a bookshelf", said Batmanglij. "We realized that there are things connecting the songs across three albums, like an invisible hand was guiding us. It does feel like we've been able to create three distinct worlds for each album, and yet have them be interconnected."

== Music and lyrics ==
Modern Vampires of the City is indeed a deeply God-haunted work ... Koenig doesn't give any indication he himself is a believer (more often just the opposite), but there is a recurring sense of engagement with God throughout the album, a sense of wrestling with the implications and impossibilities of faith. By accident or, more likely, by design, this builds and builds until Koenig puts everything on the table and addresses God directly.

— Barry Lenser, PopMatters

Modern Vampires of the City is a departure from the percussive, African-influenced indie pop of Contra. Batmanglij said that the album has a recurring tension that distinguishes it from the band's previous albums: "Even if the songs are mostly in a major key, there's something that's hanging out there that's a little bit dark. And I think that's reflective of the world." According to Heather Phares of AllMusic, the album abandoned the eclectic influences of Contra in favor of "a less audacious production style and smaller instrumental palette: guitar, organ, harpsichord, and the occasional sample combine into a rarefied sound that suggests a more insular version of their debut". She pointed to how the album is bookended by the stylistically narrow chamber pop on the songs "Obvious Bicycle" and "Young Lion".

"Step" was inspired by a lyric from Souls of Mischief's 1993 song "Step to My Girl", which sampled Grover Washington, Jr.'s cover of Bread's "Aubrey". The vocal melody of the chorus interprets the melody of "Aubrey" so close that the band had to clear it as a sample. The chorus vocals were recorded in Ableton Live using the onboard microphone in Batmanglij's MacBook Pro. Alexis Petridis viewed that some songs echo lesser known "musical tropes" from the group's previous albums—a mock Irish folk influence is heard on "Unbelievers", while "Step" features "Left Banke-inspired baroque pop". More generally, Steven Edelstone of Paste magazine regarded the music as a mix of "chamber pop and world-weariness". According to Brice Ezell from PopMatters, this album is "very much an indie rock record" because of Koenig's voice and diction, which reveals "the youth that he and his bandmates so often strive to shrug off." Ezell asserts that, on songs such as "Unbelievers", the "reckless abandon" expressed by the lyrics reveals "the group's grasp on the genuine rebellion that indie rock ought to strive for."

In comparison to the band's previous music, the lyrics explore more mature, world-weary themes such as growing old and disillusionment with American foreign policy. The album abandons the theme of privileged youth from their first two albums in favor of characters faced with adult responsibilities and reflections on the passage of time. Faith and mortality are recurring themes on songs such as "Unbelievers", "Worship You", and "Everlasting Arms". Koenig discussed Modern Vampires of the City in the context of the band's first three albums, which he compared to Brideshead Revisited: "The naïve joyous school days in the beginning. Then the expansion of the world, travel, seeing other places, learning a little bit more about how people live. And then the end is a little bit of growing up, starting to think more seriously about your life and your faith. If people could look at our three albums as a bildungsroman, I'd be O.K. with that."

== Title and packaging ==
The title was taken from a lyric in Junior Reid's 1990 song "One Blood". Koenig, a fan of the song, found the phrase "Modern Vampires of the City" humorous but also "haunting" as a title for their album. The album's title was revealed in the "Notices & Lost and Found" column of the classifieds section in The New York Times on February 4, 2013; vaguely defined, curlicued letters spelling the title were printed alongside the release date.

Koenig, Batmanglij, and art directors Matt de Jong and Asher Sarlin were credited with designing the album's packaging. For the cover art, the band chose an image taken by New York Times photographer Neal Boenzi, depicting a smog-shrouded, dystopian-looking New York City. Boenzi took the photo atop the Empire State Building in November 1966, when the city was plagued by a smog problem. Because of the subsequent rise in global air pollution, the band chose the photo believing it may have rendered "some kind of future".

== Marketing and sales ==
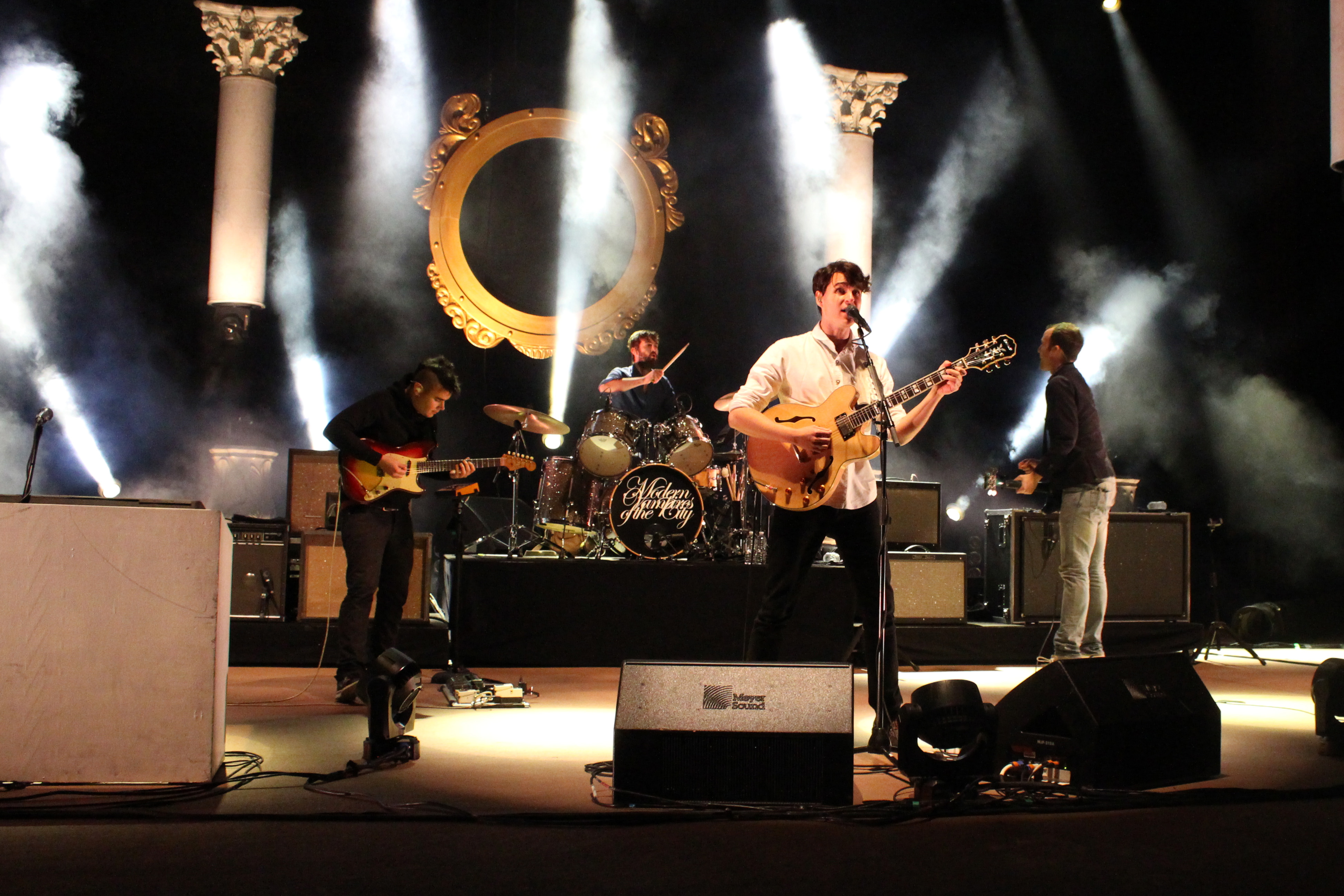
The band playing Colorado's Red Rocks Amphitheatre in 2013

To promote the album, XL Recordings released "Diane Young" and "Step" as a double A-sided single on March 19, 2013. Modern Vampires of the City was released by XL on May 14, and Vampire Weekend played several concerts and music festivals shortly after, eventually embarking on a larger supporting tour throughout late 2013, beginning with a show at the Mann Center for the Performing Arts in Philadelphia on September 19. John Gentile of Rolling Stone reported that the band headlined "some of their largest venues to date" on the tour.

In the album's first week of release, it debuted number one on the Billboard 200 and sold 134,000 copies in the United States. It was Vampire Weekend's second consecutive number-one record on the chart, as well as the nineteenth independently distributed album to top the Billboard 200 in the Nielsen SoundScan era (1991–present). The record entered the UK Albums Chart at number three with first-week sales of 27,805 copies, becoming the group's third consecutive top-twenty album in the United Kingdom. By December 2014, it had been certified gold by the Recording Industry Association of America and sold 505,000 copies in the US. In 2014, it was awarded a diamond certification from the Independent Music Companies Association, which indicated sales of at least 200,000 copies throughout Europe.

== Critical reception ==
Professional ratings
Aggregate scores
Source	Rating
AnyDecentMusic?	8.2/10
Metacritic	84/100
Review scores
Source	Rating
AllMusic	5/5 stars
Entertainment Weekly	A−
The Guardian	4/5 stars
The Independent	4/5 stars
MSN Music (Expert Witness)	A+
NME	7/10
Pitchfork	9.3/10
Rolling Stone	4.5/5 stars
Spin	8/10
The Times	4/5 stars

Modern Vampires of the City was met with widespread critical acclaim. At Metacritic, which assigns a normalized rating out of 100 to reviews from mainstream publications, the album received an average score of 84, based on 51 reviews. Aggregator AnyDecentMusic? gave it 8.2 out of 10, based on their assessment of the critical consensus.

Reviewing the album in The Independent, Simon Price called it Vampire Weekend's "most cohesive and convincing effort yet" featuring their most accessible compositions. Ryan Dombal from Pitchfork said the singing suited the music fluidly on songs that sounded more natural and dynamic than the band's previous work. Alexis Petridis, lead critic for The Guardian, believed Vampire Weekend successfully avoided the gimmicky sounds of their previous albums and wrote more genuine lyrics dealing with mortality rather than "arch depictions of moneyed young Wasp lives". Slant Magazine's Jesse Cataldo said the songs may sound dense and wordy, but they would be "immediately potent on a purely visceral level" for listeners, "striking a perfect balance that makes for what's perhaps the best album of the year". Nathan Brackett of Rolling Stone said the album featured a particular spirit and songcraft evocative of urban life, while Robert Christgau appreciated how many twists the coming of age themes revealed. In his review for MSN Music, Christgau found the record similar to the Beatles' Sgt. Pepper's Lonely Hearts Club Band (1967) because of how each lyric and musical element was "pleasurable in itself and aptly situated in the sturdy songs and tracks, so that the whole signifies without a hint of concept".

Other reviewers expressed some reservations. In the Chicago Tribune, Greg Kot wrote that Vampire Weekend occasionally blundered in an attempt at ingenuity with the songs "Ya Hey" and "Finger Back" while finding the album "darker, slower and weirder" than their previous records. NME journalist John Calvert believed the band had sacrificed "the sonic smarts that made them" on what was an otherwise "gorgeous album".

=== Accolades ===
By the end of 2013, Modern Vampires of the City had been named the year's best album in a number of polls. AllMusic named it one of the year's 50 best records, and it was voted the second best album of 2013 in the Pazz & Jop, an annual poll of American critics nationwide, published by The Village Voice. Christgau, the poll's creator, ranked it first in his own list for The Barnes & Noble Review, writing in an accompanying essay that Vampire Weekend had made an art pop record that "simulates predigital warmth by tinkering with a dizzying panoply of studio stratagems and divides the most emotional songs of the band's career into distinct parts impossible to enumerate due to how often the arrangements change up gorgeous drum tracks, but I dare you to dance to them". At the 2014 Grammy Awards, Modern Vampires of the City won in the category of Best Alternative Music Album. In 2020, Rolling Stone placed it at number 328 on the magazine's revision to the 500 Greatest Albums of All Time list.

Publication	Rank	List
American Songwriter	12	Top 50 Albums of 2013
The A.V. Club	5	The 23 Best Albums of 2013
Billboard	12	15 Best Albums of 2013
Billboard	11	20 Best Albums of the 2010s So Far (2010–14)
Clash	9	Top Albums of 2013
Complex	47	The 50 Best Albums of 2013
Consequence of Sound	2	Top 50 Albums of 2013
Drowned in Sound	6	Favourite Albums of 2013
Exclaim!	4	Top 20 Pop & Rock Albums
The Fly	32	Albums of the Year
The Guardian	4	The best albums of 2013
GQ	17	21 Best Albums of the 21st Century (2000–14)
Magnet	19	Top 25 Albums of 2013
Mojo	7	Top 50 Albums of 2013
musicOMH	6	Top 100 Albums of 2013
The New York Times	3	Top Ten Year-End List
NME	14	50 Best Albums of 2013
NME	19	50 Best Albums of the Decade So Far (2010–14)
Paste	7	The 50 Best Albums of 2013
Pitchfork	1	The Top 50 Albums of 2013
Pitchfork	6	The 100 Best Albums of the Decade So Far (2010–14)
Pitchfork	7	The 200 Best Albums of the 2010s
PopMatters	1	The 75 Best Albums of 2013
Q	2	50 Albums of the Year
Rolling Stone	1	50 Best Albums of 2013
Rolling Stone	328	500 Greatest Albums of All Time (2020)
Slant Magazine	1	The 25 Best Albums of 2013
Spin	3	50 Best Albums of 2013
Spin	60	300 Best Albums of the Past 30 Years (1985–2014)
Sputnikmusic	17	Top 50 Albums of 2013
Stereogum	3	The 50 Best Albums of 2013
Time	2	Top 10 Albums of 2013
Time Out	26	50 Best Albums of 2013
Uncut	20	Top 50 Albums of 2013
Under the Radar	1	Top 125 Albums of 2013
The Village Voice	2	Pazz and Jop

== Track listing ==
All lyrics are written by Ezra Koenig, except where noted; all music is composed by Rostam Batmanglij and Koenig, except where noted.

No.	Title	Lyrics	Music	Length
1.	"Obvious Bicycle"			4:11
2.	"Unbelievers"			3:22
3.	"Step"	Koenig, David Gates	Batmanglij, Koenig, Gates	4:11
4.	"Diane Young"			2:40
5.	"Don't Lie"	Koenig, Batmanglij		3:33
6.	"Hannah Hunt"			3:57
7.	"Everlasting Arms"			3:03
8.	"Finger Back"			3:25
9.	"Worship You"			3:21
10.	"Ya Hey"		Batmanglij, Koenig, Ariel Rechtshaid	5:12
11.	"Hudson"		Batmanglij, Koenig, Chris Tomson	4:14
12.	"Young Lion"	Batmanglij	Batmanglij	1:45
Total length:				42:54

Japanese edition bonus tracks
No.	Title	Length
13.	"Ya Hey" (Paranoid Styles Mix)	3:51
14.	"Unbelievers" (Seeburg Drum Machine Mix)	3:24
Total length:		49:09

=== Notes ===
- "Obvious Bicycle" contains a sample of "Keep Cool Babylon" by Ras Michael and The Sons of Negus.
- "Step" contains elements from "Aubrey" by David Gates and YZ's "Who's That Girl" in its hook.

== Personnel ==
Credits adapted from the album's liner notes.

Vampire Weekend

- Chris Baio – bass
- Rostam Batmanglij – piano, guitars, banjo, vocal harmonies and backing vocals, drum and synth programming, keyboards, shaker, lead vocals (track 12)
- Ezra Koenig – lead vocals, guitars, piano (track 2)
- Chris Tomson – drums

Production

- Rostam Batmanglij – production, mixing (except tracks 2–4 and 10), string and brass arrangements, engineering
- Ariel Rechtshaid – production, mixing (except tracks 2–4 and 10), engineering
- Scott Jacoby – mixing (track 2)
- Emily Lazar – mixing (track 2), mastering
- Rich Costey – mixing (tracks 3, 4 and 10)
- Chris Kasych – mix assistance and Pro Tools engineering (tracks 3, 4 and 10)
- Eric Isip – assistance (tracks 3, 4 and 10)
- Joe LaPorta – mastering
- Shruta Kumar – score copying
- Dave Schiffman – engineering
- Michael Harris – engineering
- Nick Rowe – engineering
- Juan Pieczanski – additional engineering (track 4)
- Jeff Curtin – additional engineering (track 4)
- Justin Gerrish – Pro Tools operation, additional mix engineering
- Fernando Lodero – Pro Tools operation
- Angelo Vasquex – Pro Tools operation
- Rich Rich – Pro Tools operation
- Hans Crump – Pro Tools operation

Additional musicians

- Fanny Franklin – backing vocals (track 8)
- Angel Deradoorian – backing vocals (tracks 1, 9 and 12), additional vocal arrangement
- Adam Schatz – saxophone (track 4)
- Jeff Curtin – additional drums (track 4)
- Johnny Cuomo – flistle (track 2)
- Brendan Ryan – accordion (track 2)
- Elizabeth Lea – trombone (tracks 2 and 11)
- Danny T. Levin – trumpet (tracks 2 and 11)
- Seth Shafer – tuba (tracks 2 and 11)
- Ariel Rechtshaid – additional drum and synth programming (tracks 1, 2, 4 and 11), additional bass (track 7)

Artwork

- Rostam Batmanglij – album cover design, compact disc design, art direction
- Ezra Koenig – album cover design, art direction
- Alex John Beck – band photo
- Asher Sarlin – compact disc design
- Matt de Jong – packaging layout, booklet design

== Charts ==
=== Weekly charts ===
Weekly chart performance for Modern Vampires of the City
Chart (2013)	Peak position
Australian Albums (ARIA)	7
Austrian Albums (Ö3 Austria)	24
Belgian Albums (Ultratop Flanders)	5
Belgian Albums (Ultratop Wallonia)	29
Canadian Albums (Billboard)	2
Danish Albums (Hitlisten)	31
Dutch Albums (Album Top 100)	20
Finnish Albums (Suomen virallinen lista)	34
French Albums (SNEP)	18
German Albums (Offizielle Top 100)	21
Greek Albums (IFPI)	47
Irish Albums (IRMA)	2
Irish Independent Albums (IRMA)	1
Italian Albums (FIMI)	55
Japanese Albums (Oricon)	13
New Zealand Albums (RMNZ)	19
Norwegian Albums (VG-lista)	2
Portuguese Albums (AFP)	4
Scottish Albums (Official Charts)	3
Spanish Albums (Promusicae)	13
Swedish Albums (Sverigetopplistan)	17
Swiss Albums (Schweizer Hitparade)	18
UK Albums (Official Charts)	3
UK Independent Albums (Official Charts)	1
US Billboard 200	1
US Independent Albums (Billboard)	1
US Top Alternative Albums (Billboard)	1
US Top Rock Albums (Billboard)	1

=== Year-end charts ===
2013 year-end chart performance for Modern Vampires of the City
Chart (2013)	Position
Belgian Albums (Ultratop Flanders)	81
UK Albums (OCC)	94
US Billboard 200	74
US Independent Albums (Billboard)	6
US Top Alternative Albums (Billboard)	11
US Top Rock Albums (Billboard)	15

2014 year-end chart performance for Modern Vampires of the City
Chart (2014)	Position
US Billboard 200	167
US Independent Albums (Billboard)	13
US Top Alternative Albums (Billboard)	35
US Top Rock Albums (Billboard)	39

== Certifications ==
Region	Certification	Certified units/sales
Canada (Music Canada)	Gold	40,000^{^}
Portugal (AFP)	Platinum	15,000^{^}
United Kingdom (BPI)	Gold	139,695
United States (RIAA)	Gold	500,000^{^}
^{^} Shipments figures based on certification alone.

== See also ==
- List of number-one albums of 2013 (U.S.)
- List of number-one independent albums (U.S.)
