= Dying Is Fine =

Single by Ra Ra Riot

from the album The Rhumb Line
- Released: 2007
- Genre: Indie rock
- Length: 3:51
- Label: Barsuk Records, The Rebel Group, V2 Records
- Songwriter(s): E. E. Cummings, Ra Ra Riot, John Pike

Ra Ra Riot singles chronology
"Each Year" (2007)	"Dying Is Fine" (2007)	"Can't Even Tell" (2008)

"Dying Is Fine" was one of the first songs written by Ra Ra Riot. It was released several times, and was reworked for their first full album, The Rhumb Line, in 2008. The song was inspired by the E. E. Cummings poem, dying is fine)but death

== History and release ==
"Dying Is Fine" was written in January 2006. Ra Ra Riot recorded "Dying Is Fine" on a Daytrotter Session on October 15, 2007.

It was reworked and re-recorded several times; as a single for V2 Records, on the 2007 EP Ra Ra Riot, and on the first album release, The Rhumb Line, on Barsuk Records.

"Dying Is Fine" was chosen as the Free MP3 of the Day on music blog Spinner on July 17, 2008.
