= Ra Ra Riot (EP) =

EP by Ra Ra Riot
- Released: July 10, 2007
- Recorded: January 2007
- Genre: Indie rock
- Length: 22:14
- Label: The Rebel Group
- Producer: Self-produced

Ra Ra Riot chronology
Ra Ra Riot (2007)	The Rhumb Line (2008)

Professional ratings
Review scores
Source	Rating
Prefix Magazine	(7.0/10)

Ra Ra Riot is the self-titled EP and debut release of the Syracuse-based indie rock band Ra Ra Riot. Recorded in Brooklyn, New York in January 2007, the six-song EP was originally self-released before the band signed with The Rebel Group for distribution.

== Track listing ==
1. "Each Year" – 3:48
2. "Everest" – 2:26
3. "Dying Is Fine" – 6:09
4. "Can You Tell" – 2:31
5. "A Manner to Act" – 2:51
6. "Ghost Under Rocks" – 4:29

=== Videos ===
- "Dying Is Fine": Directed by Albert Birney, Nicholas Gurewitch, and Jon Moses.

== Personnel ==
- Milo Bonacci: guitar
- Alexandra Lawn: cello
- Wesley Miles: keyboards / vocals
- John Pike: drums
- Mathieu Santos: bass guitar
- Rebecca Zeller: violin
