= The Loves of Your Life =

Studio album by Hamilton Leithauser
- Released: April 10, 2020
- Studio: The Struggle Hut
- Genre: Indie rock
- Length: 42:27
- Label: Glassnote

Hamilton Leithauser chronology
I Had a Dream That You Were Mine (2016)	The Loves of Your Life (2020)	This Side of the Island (2025)

Singles from The Loves of Your Life
- 1. "Here They Come"; 2. "Isabella"; 3. "Don't Check the Score"

Professional ratings
Aggregate scores
Source	Rating
Metacritic	80/100
Review scores
Source	Rating
AllMusic	4/5 stars
Beats Per Minute	70%
Clash	8/10
The Line of Best Fit	9/10
Mojo	4/5 stars
MusicOMH	4/5 stars
No Ripcord	6/10
Paste	8.2/10
Pitchfork	7.6/10
Q	4/5 stars

The Loves of Your Life is a studio album by Hamilton Leithauser, the former frontman of the Walkmen. It was released on April 10, 2020, on Glassnote Records, and preceded by the singles "Here They Come", "Isabella", and "Don't Check the Score".

== Track listing ==
The Loves of Your Life track listing
No.	Title	Length
1.	"The Garbage Men"	3:18
2.	"Isabella"	4:09
3.	"Here They Come"	3:14
4.	"Cross-Sound Ferry (Walk-on Ticket)"	4:17
5.	"Don't Check the Score"	4:55
6.	"Til Your Ship Comes In"	3:41
7.	"The Stars of Tomorrow"	3:18
8.	"Wack Jack"	3:24
9.	"Stars & Rats"	3:36
10.	"The Other Half"	4:30
11.	"The Old King"	4:05
Total length:		42:27
