= Need Your Light =

Studio album by Ra Ra Riot
- Released: February 19, 2016
- Genre: Indie rock, indie pop
- Length: 35:48
- Label: Barsuk
- Producer: Rostam Batmanglij; Ryan Hadlock

Ra Ra Riot chronology
Beta Love (2013)	Need Your Light (2016)	Superbloom (2019)

Singles from Need Your Light
- 1. "Water" Released: November 16, 2015; 2. "Absolutely" Released: January 1, 2016

Professional ratings
Aggregate scores
Source	Rating
Metacritic	69/100
Review scores
Source	Rating
The A.V. Club	B
Consequence of Sound	C
DIY	2/5 stars
Exclaim!	6/10
Pitchfork Media	6.8/10
PopMatters	5/10 stars
Under the Radar	4.5/10 stars

Need Your Light is the fourth studio album by American indie rock band Ra Ra Riot, released on February 19, 2016. The album was produced by Ryan Hadlock, except for "Water" & "I Need Your Light" produced by Rostam Batmanglij.

== Track listing ==
No.	Title	Length
1.	"Water" (featuring Rostam)	4:40
2.	"Absolutely"	3:46
3.	"Foreign Lovers"	2:10
4.	"I Need Your Light" (featuring Rostam)	4:24
5.	"Bad Times"	3:35
6.	"Call Me Out"	3:35
7.	"Instant Breakup"	3:26
8.	"Every Time I'm Ready to Hug"	2:53
9.	"Bouncy Castle"	3:02
10.	"Suckers"	4:17
Total length:		35:48
