= Ra Ra Riot =

American indie rock band

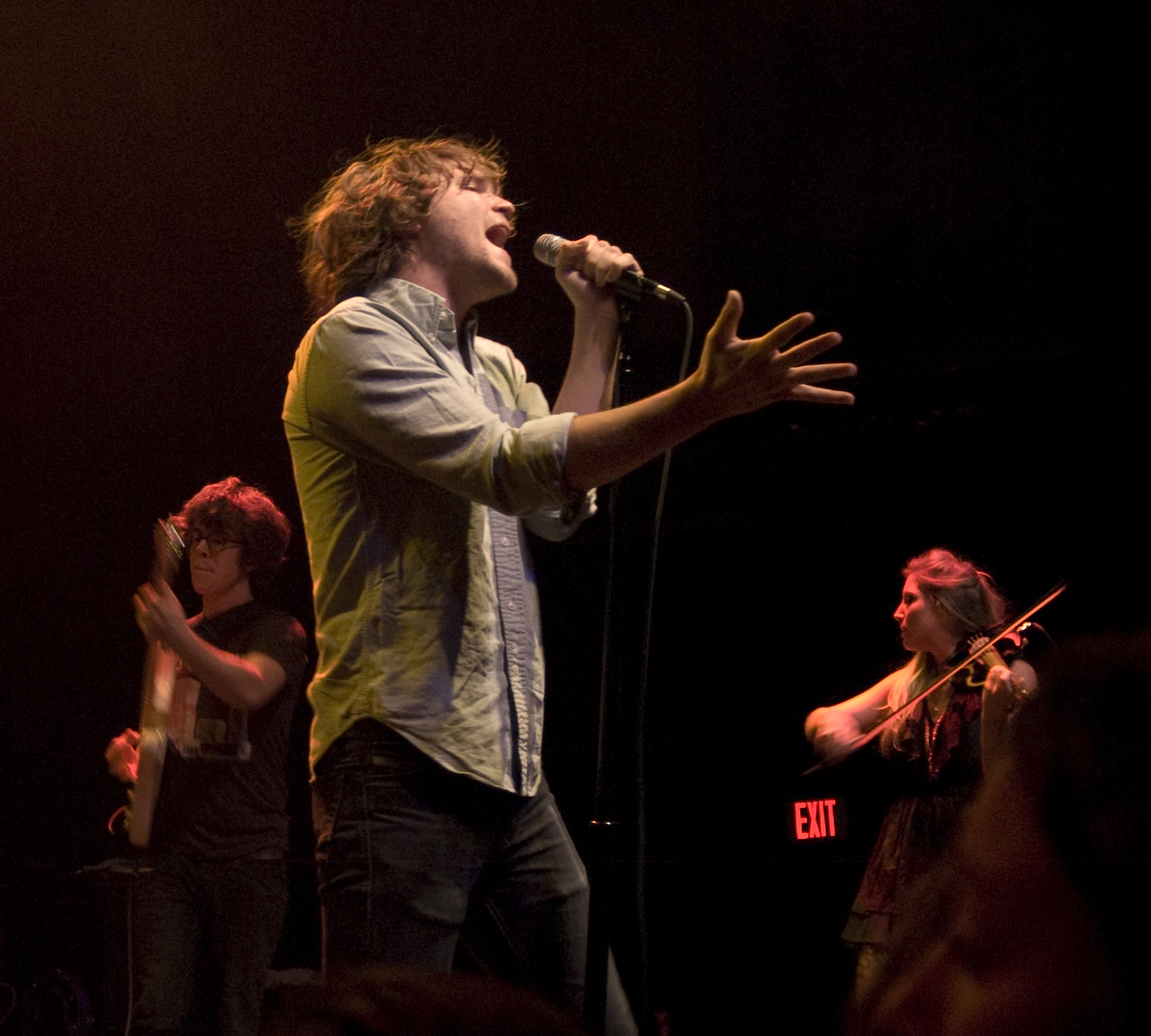
- Ra Ra Riot playing at the 9:30 Club in Washington, D.C.

Background information
- Origin: Syracuse, New York, U.S.
- Genres: Indie rock, baroque pop
- Years active: 2006–present
- Labels: Rebel Group; V2; Barsuk; Arts & Crafts México; Only in Dreams
- Members: Wes Miles; Mathieu Santos; Milo Bonacci; Rebecca Zeller; Kenny Bernard
- Past members: John Ryan Pike; Shaw Flick; Cameron Wisch; Michael Ashley; Gabriel Duquette; Alexandra Lawn
- Website: www.rarariot.com

Ra Ra Riot is an American indie rock band consisting of Wes Miles (vocals); Mathieu Santos (bass); Milo Bonacci (guitar); Rebecca Zeller (violin); and Kenny Bernard (drums).

== History ==
Ra Ra Riot formed in January 2006, playing at houses and venues around the Syracuse University campus. They recorded a demo in February 2006. The band started to attract attention due to their energetic live shows, enough to gain an appearance at the CMJ Music Marathon, fewer than six months after their formation. Following this appearance, their live show received the first of several favorable reviews from Spin, who called them "one of the best young bands we've heard in a really long time". They went on to open for Art Brut and Bow Wow Wow in New York City, toured the UK twice on their own, then returned, opening for the Editors (footage of which can be found on Crackle); they also toured North America supporting Tokyo Police Club. Their first solo headlining tour of the U.S. was completed in 2007, and in early 2008, they embarked on a second. The band was also invited to play the Iceland Airwaves Festival in Reykjavík, Iceland. They recorded three sessions on the national online radio station WOXY and three for the acclaimed Daytrotter sessions at Futureappletree Studio 1 in Rock Island, Illinois.

In 2007, they made their first appearance at South by Southwest and headlined a show at the Seaport Music Festival in New York City. The band returned to appear again at the South by Southwest Music Conference in March 2008.

On June 2, 2007, at 3 a.m., the band's original drummer, John Ryan Pike of Hamilton, Massachusetts, went missing under suspicious circumstances at a party at Wilbur's Point in Fairhaven, Massachusetts, after a show in Providence, Rhode Island. A search party discovered his cellphone on the beach at Buzzards Bay. His body was discovered June 3, 2007, at 4:10 p.m. in Buzzards Bay; Pike was believed to have drowned. No foul play was suspected. Ra Ra Riot issued a statement a few weeks after Pike's funeral that they would continue as a band.

In July 2007, an eponymous six-song EP was released on the Rebel Group label. In the winter of 2007, the band signed to major label V2 Records. To celebrate their new label deal, Ra Ra Riot released "Dying Is Fine" and "Each Year (RAC Mix)" on 7" vinyl as an A/B single. In December 2007, the band announced that they had finished recording songs for their debut studio album.

On May 19, 2008, the band announced that they had signed to Barsuk Records. They released their debut album, The Rhumb Line, on August 19, 2008, in North America, and on September 22, 2008, in Europe via V2/Cooperative Music. The music video for "Can You Tell" won Best Music Video at the 2009 Finger Lakes Film Festival on November 7, 2009.

In the spring of 2009, Barsuk released the Can You Tell EP, featuring remixes, early demos and live recordings. The band released their second studio album, The Orchard, on August 24, 2010. It was produced by Ra Ra Riot and Andrew Maury. Nine of the 10 tracks were mixed by Death Cab for Cutie's Chris Walla, while one was mixed by Vampire Weekend's Rostam Batmanglij.

In January 2011, Ra Ra Riot were nominated for the 10th annual Independent Music Awards in the Pop/Rock Album category for The Orchard. Also in 2011, their song "Boy" was featured in a Honda Civic commercial and used in an episode ("A History of Violins") of the TV show Royal Pains as well as in an episode of Shameless. On February 10, 2012, cellist Alexandra Lawn announced that she was leaving the band.

The band's third studio album, Beta Love, was released on January 22, 2013, coinciding with a live worldwide Internet broadcast of the band's concert that night at Music Hall of Williamsburg in Brooklyn, New York. The album was the band's first full-length since the departure of Lawn and marked a shift in their musical style away from their earlier baroque pop and more towards synthpop. A video was produced for the song "Dance With Me".

On February 19, 2016, Ra Ra Riot released their fourth studio album, Need Your Light. The album was produced by Ryan Hadlock (Lumineers, Vance Joy) with additional production by Batmanglij, who produced and co-wrote the title track as well as the popular single "Water."

On May 17, 2019, the band shared a new song, “Flowers”, along with the announcement of their fifth studio album, Superbloom. The album, released on August 9, saw the band collaborate with Rostam once again.

On February 20, 2024, the band announced the RA RA RIOT: REDIVIVUS Tour, in celebration of the fifteenth anniversary of The Rhumb Line, partially supporting Vampire Weekend.

On May 1, 2024, Ra Ra Riot released their first new song in five years, "The Wish", co-written and produced by Rostam Batmanglij.

== Members ==
=== Current members ===
- Wes Miles – lead vocals, keyboards, occasional acoustic guitar (2006–present)
- Mathieu Santos – bass guitar, backing vocals (2006–present)
- Milo Bonacci – guitar, keyboards (2006–present)
- Rebecca Zeller – violin, backing vocals (2006–present)
- Kenny Bernard – drums, programming (2011–present)
- Emily Brausa – cello, backing vocals (2012–2014, 2024–present)

=== Former members ===
- Shaw Flick – lead vocals (2006)
- John Pike – drums (2006–2007; died 2007)
- Alexandra Lawn – cello (2006–2012)
- Michael Ashley – drums (2007)
- Cameron Wisch – drums (2007–2009)
- Gabriel Duquette – drums (2009–2011)

== Discography ==
=== Studio albums ===
Title	Album details	Peak chart positions			
Title	Album details	US	US Alt.	US Indie	US Rock
The Rhumb Line	Released: August 19, 2008; Label: Barsuk	109	—	14	—
The Orchard	Released: August 24, 2010; Label: Barsuk	36	6	7	12
Beta Love	Released: January 22, 2013; Label: Barsuk	69	16	11	23
Need Your Light	Released: February 19, 2016; Label: Barsuk	—	20	15	29
Superbloom	Released: August 9, 2019; Label: Rob the Rich Recordings/Caroline	—	—	41	—
"—" denotes album that did not chart or was not released

=== EPs ===
- Ra Ra Riot EP (2007, Rebel Group)
- Can You Tell EP (2009, Barsuk)

=== Singles ===
Title	Year	Peak chart positions			Album
Title	Year	US Rock Digital	JPN	UK Indie	Album
"Each Year"	2007	—	—	29	The Rhumb Line
"Dying Is Fine"	2007	—	—	—	The Rhumb Line
"Ghost Under Rocks"	2008	—	—	—	The Rhumb Line
"Can You Tell"	2009	—	—	—	The Rhumb Line
"Boy"	2010	34	85	—	The Orchard
"Too Dramatic"	2011	—	—	—	The Orchard
"Beta Love"	2012	—	45	—	Beta Love
"Dance With Me"	2013	—	—	—	Beta Love
"Water"	2015	—	— (Note: "Water" did not enter the Oricon Singles chart, but charted at 53 on the Billboard Japan Radio Songs.)	—	Need Your Light
"Absolutely"	2016	—	—	—	Need Your Light
"This Time of Year"	2018	—	—	—	Superbloom
"Flowers"	2019	—	—	—	Superbloom
"Bad to Worse"	2019	—	—	—	Superbloom
"War and Famine"	2019	—	—	—	Superbloom
"Belladonna"	2019	—	—	—	Superbloom
"The Wish"	2024	—	—	—	non-album single
"Friendly Neighbor"	2024	—	—	—	non-album single
"—" denotes single that did not chart or was not released
