= Black Hours (album) =

Studio album by Hamilton Leithauser
- Released: June 3, 2014
- Recorded: Vox Studios, Los Angeles, CA
- Genres: Chamber pop, rock and roll
- Label: Ribbon Music
- Producers: Hamilton Leithauser, Paul Maroon, Rostam Batmanglij

Professional ratings
Aggregate scores
Source	Rating
Metacritic	74
Review scores
Source	Rating
AllMusic	3.5/5 stars
The A.V. Club	B+
Drowned in Sound	7/10 stars
Exclaim!	8/10 stars
Pitchfork Media	(7.4/10.0)
Rolling Stone	3/5 stars
Uncut	8/10 stars

Black Hours is the debut solo studio album by The Walkmen's singer Hamilton Leithauser. The album was released on June 3, 2014. It features collaborations with Rostam Batmanglij from Vampire Weekend, Amber Coffman from Dirty Projectors, Richard Swift from the Shins, Morgan Henderson from Fleet Foxes, and Paul Maroon from the Walkmen.

== Track listing ==
1. "5 AM"
2. "The Silent Orchestra"
3. "Alexandra"
4. "11 O’Clock Friday Night"
5. "St Mary's County"
6. "Self Pity"
7. "I Retired"
8. "I Don’t Need Anyone"
9. "Bless Your Heart"
10. "The Smallest Splinter"
11. "Waltz" [Deluxe edition]
12. "In Our Time (I'll Always Love You)" [Deluxe edition]
13. "Utrecht" [Deluxe edition]
14. "I’ll Never Love Again" [Deluxe edition]

== Personnel ==
- Hamilton Leithauser – vocals, guitar, bass, arrangements
- Michael Harris – bowed bass
- Morgan Henderson – upright bass, clarinet, bass, percussions, marimba
- Richard Swift – drums, background vocals
- Hugh McIntosh – drums
- Paul Maroon – piano, organ, guitar, arrangements, background vocals
- Amber Coffman – vocals
- Rostam Batmanglij – guitar, bass, harmonica, piano, harpsichord, tambourine, shaker, background vocals
- Anna Stumpf – vocals
