= Hamilton Leithauser =

American musician (born 1978)

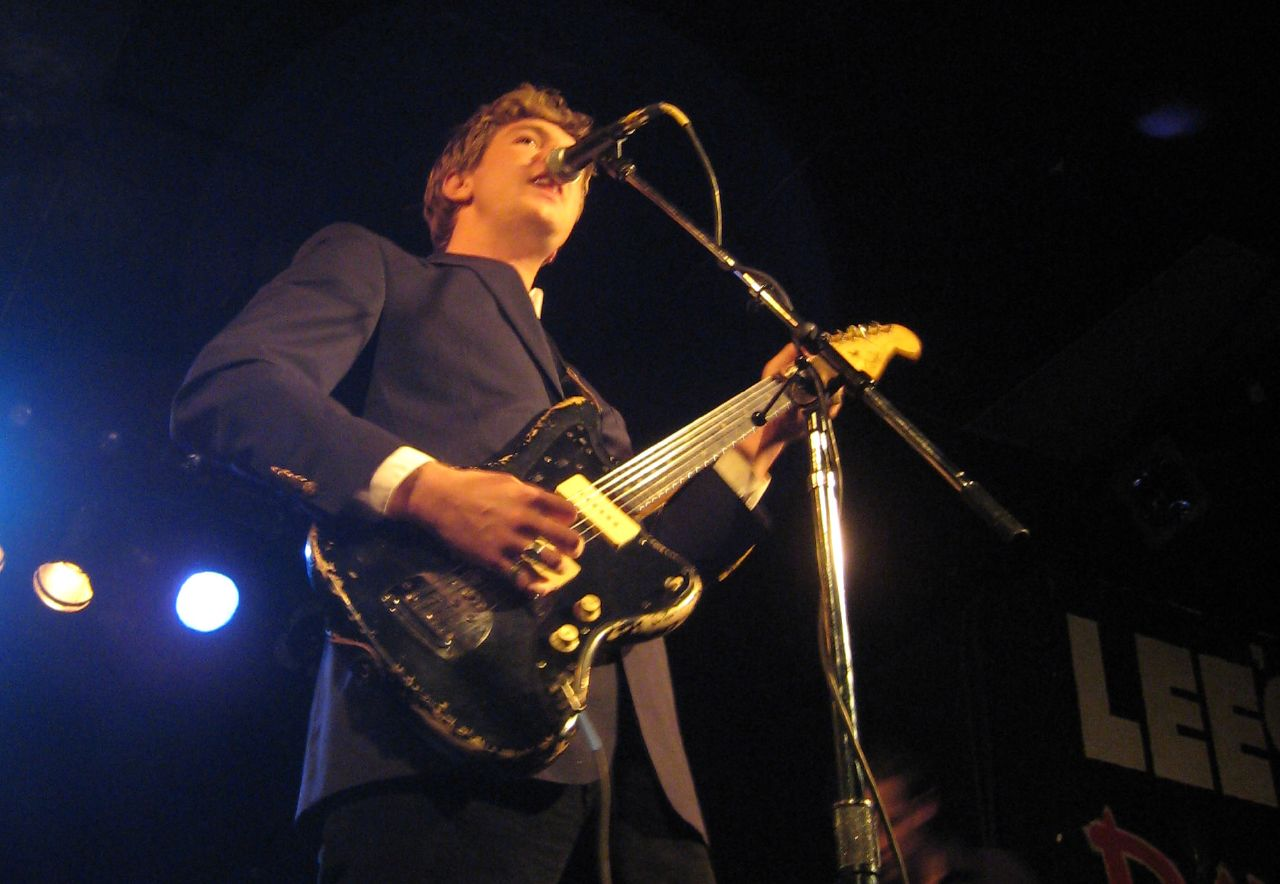
- Leithauser performing with the Walkmen in 2007

Background information
- Born: James Hamilton Leithauser; April 15, 1978 (age 48); Washington, D.C., U.S.
- Occupation: Musician
- Instruments: Guitar, vocals
- Years active: 1996–present
- Label: Glassnote
- Member of: The Walkmen
- Formerly of: The Recoys
- Website: hamiltonleithauser.com

James Hamilton Leithauser (born April 15, 1978) is an American singer, songwriter, and multi-instrumentalist. He is the lead vocalist of the American indie rock band The Walkmen, with whom he wrote and recorded seven studio albums from 2000 to 2014. Prior to The Walkmen's formation, Leithauser and bass guitarist and organist, Peter Matthew Bauer, were both members of The Recoys. Leithauser was born and raised in Washington, DC, and has lived in New York City since the 1990s.

Leithauser embarked upon a solo career in 2014, releasing his debut studio album, Black Hours, on June 3, written and recorded alongside his Walkmen bandmate Paul Maroon. In 2016, Leithauser collaborated with former Vampire Weekend multi-instrumentalist Rostam Batmanglij on the studio album I Had a Dream That You Were Mine, under both artists' names. It was released to widespread critical acclaim later that year. His most recent record, This Side of the Island, was released in 2025.

== Early life ==
Leithauser was born in Washington, D.C. to Mark Leithauser, an artist and former curator at the National Gallery of Art, and Mary Bryan. His sister Anna is also an artist. His paternal uncle is poet and novelist Brad Leithauser.

Leithauser attended St. Albans School where he was close friends with future bandmate Paul Maroon. As a teenager, he had a summer job at Inner Ear Studios in Arlington, Virginia where he helped engineer Fugazi's Red Medicine. He attended Boston University for two years, before transferring to New York University, where he graduated with a degree in philosophy.

== Career ==
=== The Recoys ===
The Recoys were an indie rock band from Boston, Massachusetts formed in 1996 by Hamilton Leithauser (vocals, guitar), Peter Bauer (guitar), Damon Hege (guitar), Mike Sheahan (bass) and Hugh McIntosh (drums). The band did release a three-song (now out-of-print) EP of material, The Recoys, while the band was still playing together. The post-breakup LP included the three songs from the EP as well as seven songs meant for a future LP and a tribute song performed by The Lil' Fighters. Three of the songs on The Rekoys, "That's the Punchline," "The Blizzard of '96," and "Look Out Your Window," were rerecorded by The Walkmen for various albums and EPs. Following The Recoys' breakup, Leithauser and Bauer formed The Walkmen, while Hugh McIntosh joined The French Kicks and the Child Ballads as the bands' drummer.

=== Solo and with Rostam ===
Following the hiatus of The Walkmen in late 2013, Leithauser began a solo career. His debut full-length, Black Hours, was released June 3, 2014.

In 2016, he formed Hamilton Leithauser + Rostam with Rostam Batmanglij, formerly of Vampire Weekend. They released the single "A 1000 Times" in July 2016, which they performed on The Late Show with Stephen Colbert on September 12, 2016. Their song "In a Blackout" was featured in the commercial for the Apple iPhone 7 and series Lucifer, in the episode "God Johnson" (2nd Season, 16th Episode). Their debut album, I Had a Dream That You Were Mine, was released on September 23, 2016.

His second solo album The Loves of Your Life was released on April 10, 2020. On September 4, 2020, he released the live album Live! at Café Carlyle, collecting 10 recordings made during his residency at the New York City Cafe Carlyle. It includes covers of Lana Del Rey's "The Greatest", Big Thief's "Not", and Randy Newman's "Miami".

On January 8, 2025, he released "Knockin' Heart", the first single from his third solo album This Side of the Island. Produced by Leithauser, his wife Anna Stumpf, and Aaron Dessner, the album was released on March 7, 2025, by Glassnote Records.

== Personal life ==
Leithauser is married and has two children. Over the years, Leithauser has performed and recorded with many members from his extended family: his wife, Anna Stumpf, who occasionally performs live with him and has contributed to records by Leithauser and The Walkmen; brothers-in-law Nick Stumpf, a producer and keyboardist, and Hugh McIntosh, a drummer and former bandmate in The Recoys; his father Mark who plays harmonica; as well as his children and nieces. Of note, The Walkmen bandmate Walter Martin is his elder cousin.

== Solo discography ==
=== Albums ===
- Black Hours (2014)
- Dear God (2015) (with Paul Maroon)
- I Had a Dream That You Were Mine (2016) (with Rostam)
- The Loves of Your Life (2020)
- This Side of the Island (2025)

=== EPs ===
- I Could Have Sworn (2015) (with Paul Maroon)

=== Live albums ===
- I Won't Let Up: Live At Music Hall Of Williamsburg (2017) (with Rostam)
- Live! at Café Carlyle (2020)

=== Film and TV scores ===
- The Last Movie Stars (2022)
- Long Time Sun (2024)
- Bunny (2025)
- Your Friends & Neighbors (2025; Theme only)
- Mouse (2026)

=== Singles ===
- "Room for Forgiveness" (2014, Ribbon Music)
- "Alexandra" (2014, Ribbon Music)
- "I Don't Need Anyone" (2014, Ribbon Music)
- Hamilton Leithauser + Paul Maroon – "My Reward" (2016, Leithauser & Leithauser)
- Hamilton Leithauser + Rostam – "A 1000 Times" (2016, Glassnote)
- "Heartstruck (Wild Hunger)" feat. Angel Olsen (2016, Glassnote)
- "Here They Come" (2020, Glassnote)
- "Isabella" (2020, Glassnote)
- "Check the Score" (2020, Glassnote)
- "Virginia Beach" with Kevin Morby (2021, Dead Oceans)
- "Knockin' Heart" No. 14 Adult Alternative Airplay,

No. 42 Rock and Alternative Airplay

=== Music videos ===
- "Alexandra" (2014)
- "I Don't Need Anyone" (2014)
- "11 O'Clock Friday Night" (2014)
- "Heartstruck" (2016)
- "A 1000 Times" (2016)
