= Rostam Batmanglij =

American musician

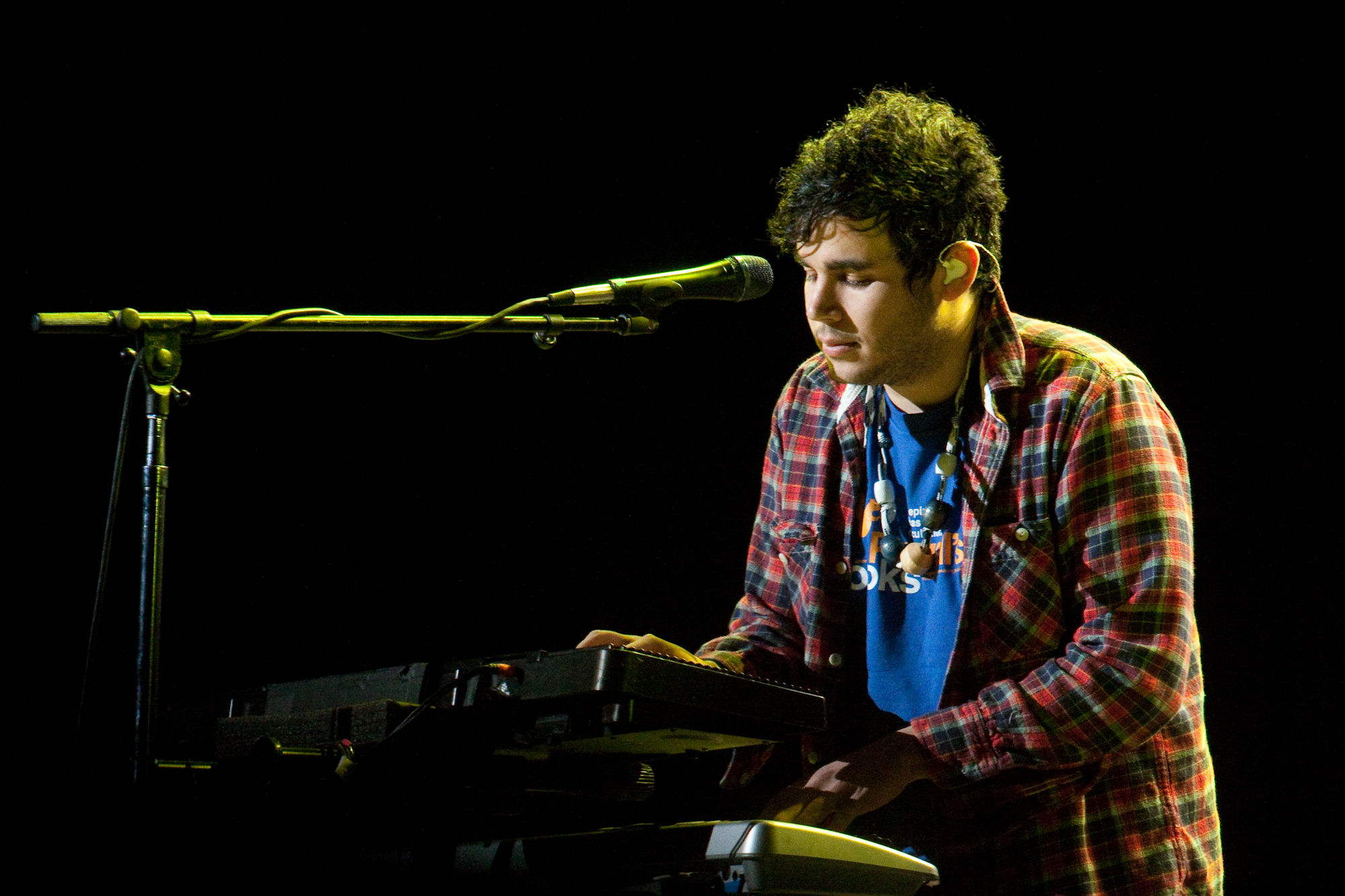
- Batmanglij performing in 2009

Background information
- Born: Washington, D.C., U.S.
- Genres: Art pop; indie rock; indie electronic
- Occupations: Record producer; musician; songwriter
- Instruments: Keyboards; vocals; guitar; bass; percussion
- Label: XL
- Formerly of: Vampire Weekend; Discovery
- Website: officialrostam.com

Rostam Batmanglij (Persian: رستم باتمانقلیج, IPA: [rosˈtæm bɒːtmɒːŋɢeˈliːdʒ]) also known mononymously as Rostam, is an American musician, record producer, and songwriter. He was a founding member of the band Vampire Weekend, whose first three albums he produced. Rostam also works as a solo artist and is a member of electro-soul group Discovery. He produced his first number-one album, Vampire Weekend's Contra, when he was 26 years old.

Batmanglij has been nominated for three Grammy Awards: twice for Best Alternative Music Album with Vampire Weekend (winning for Modern Vampires of the City) and once for Album of the Year as producer of Haim's Women in Music Pt. III.

== Early life and education ==
Rostam Batmanglij was born on November 28, 1983, to Iranian parents, and grew up in Washington, D.C. His mother is cookbook author Najmieh Batmanglij, while his father is a publisher. His parents arrived in D.C. in 1983. His brother is independent filmmaker Zal Batmanglij.

Batmanglij majored in music at Columbia University, where he joined the band Vampire Weekend in 2006. "At Columbia, I would study classical harmony in classes and I would study music on my own, and I would try to re-create songs that I love in recordings...that was really how I learned."

== Musical career ==
=== Vampire Weekend ===
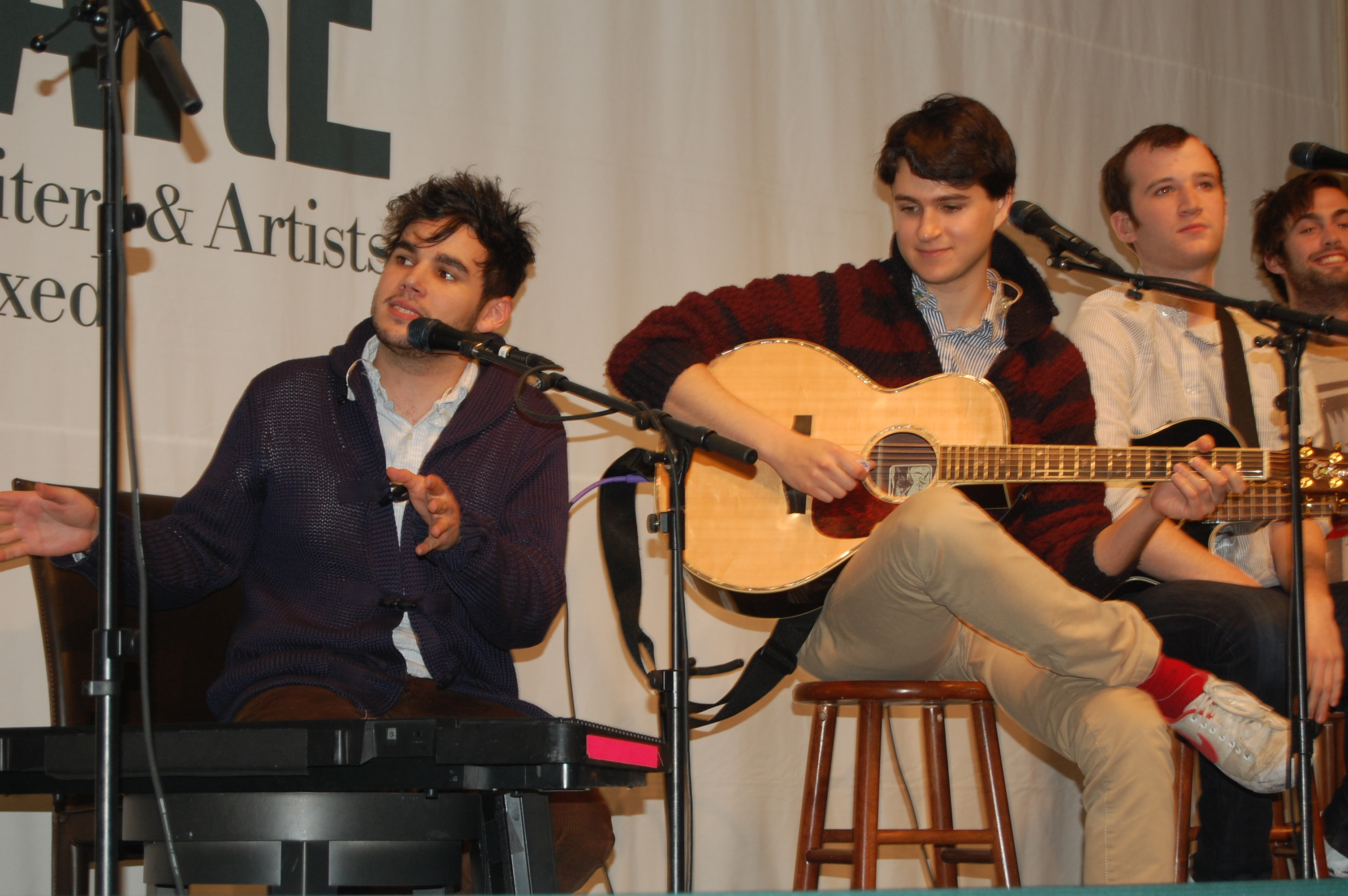
Batmanglij (left) with Ezra Koenig of Vampire Weekend in 2010

Batmanglij was a founding member of Vampire Weekend in 2006, and produced many of the group's albums. The name of the group comes from the movie of the same name that bandmate Ezra Koenig and his friends made over summer vacations. Batmanglij produced their self-titled debut album shortly after graduation while concurrently working multiple full-time jobs. He also produced the band's follow-up album, Contra, which sold 124,000 copies in its first week and landed atop the Billboard 200 charts. Batmanglij plays guitar and keyboard, and sings in the band, but also acts as a lyricist and songwriter, co-writing the song "Diplomat's Son" on Contra. Koenig has described himself and Batmanglij as "the two main songwriters in the band".

On March 18, 2013, Vampire Weekend released two songs from their album Modern Vampires of the City, "Diane Young" and "Step". Within two weeks each song had garnered more than 1 million views on YouTube. Music for both songs is credited to Batmanglij and Koenig, and lyrics are credited to Koenig. Modern Vampires of the City is the first Vampire Weekend album Batmanglij did not produce alone; for this record he collaborated with longtime friend Ariel Rechtshaid to co-produce the album together. It was released May 14, 2013.

On January 26, 2016, Batmanglij announced on Twitter that he had left Vampire Weekend to pursue solo projects, but that he would continue to collaborate with Koenig on future projects and Vampire Weekend songs.

=== Discovery ===
Batmanglij began recording with Ra Ra Riot vocalist Wes Miles on a project which was later to become Discovery. They released their debut album, LP, through XL Recordings on July 7, 2009. The album features guest vocal contributions from Koenig as well as Angel Deradoorian of Dirty Projectors.

In 2015, Batmanglij produced and contributed vocals on the song "Water" for Ra Ra Riot's fourth album, Need Your Light.

=== Solo work ===
In September 2011, Batmanglij released a solo track called "Wood". Time Out Chicago's Brent DiCrescenzo gave the song 4 out of 5 stars and wrote that "his voice pleasantly recalls a drowsy David Byrne". On November 1, 2011, Zane Lowe debuted another a solo song sung by Batmanglij called "Don't Let it Get to You" as the Hottest Record in the World on BBC Radio 1. The Fader referred to it as "a seismic event of a song". In January 2016, Batmanglij released the song "EOS" along with its music video which he had directed. On March 11, 2016, Batmanglij released the song "Gravity Don't Pull Me" along with its music video directed by himself and Josh Goleman. The video was filmed at The 1896 and features dancers Jack Grabow and Sam Asa Pratt.

On November 27, 2016, Rostam teased his new solo album, which was to be released in 2017. In the spring of 2017, Rostam released two songs from the album: "Gwan", released on April 26, and "Bike Dream", released on June 14. With the release of "Bike Dream", Rostam revealed that his debut solo album would be titled Half-Light and released on September 8, 2017.

On September 12, 2018, Rostam self-released a new single, "In a River". On October 15, 2020, Rostam self-released another new single, "Unfold You".

On February 2, 2021, Rostam self-released a single, "These Kids We Knew", and teased an upcoming album release. Exactly one month later, Batmanglij confirmed the release of his second solo album, titled Changephobia, on June 4, as well as releasing a single from the album called "4Runner".

His album American Stories released on May 15, 2026.

=== Collaborative work ===
Batmanglij has collaborated extensively with his brother, independent filmmaker Zal Batmanglij. They worked together on the film Sound of My Voice, which Rostam scored and which Zal directed and co-wrote. Rostam also composed an original piece for piano that was featured in Zal's film The East. in 2016, Rostam composed the music for both seasons of Zal's television series The OA.

In 2010, Converse released "All Summer", produced by Batmanglij and featuring Kid Cudi and Bethany Cosentino of Best Coast.

Batmanglij produced and co-wrote two songs for the Walkmen frontman Hamilton Leithauser's solo album, Black Hours, which was released in June 2014. Also in 2014, Batmanglij produced two songs for singer Charli XCX. The song "Need Ur Luv" appears on her album Sucker, and the song "Kingdom", featuring Simon Le Bon, appears on The Hunger Games: Mockingjay, Part 1 – Original Motion Picture Soundtrack. In December 2014, Batmanglij along with Diplo and Ed Droste remixed Ty Dolla Sign's "Stand For" into a new song titled "Long Way Home". Batmanglij also wrote original music for a play by Kenneth Lonergan called This Is Our Youth, starring Kieran Culkin, Michael Cera, and Tavi Gevinson, which premiered on Broadway in 2014.

In 2015, Batmanglij worked alongside Canadian singer Carly Rae Jepsen on her third studio album, Emotion. In an interview with Stereogum, Jepsen described working with Batmanglij as writing with a musician she admires, and said that together they had made "what's maybe one of [her] favorite songs" on the record. Batmanglij produced and co-wrote the fourth single, "Warm Blood", which was released on July 31, 2015. Emotion was released worldwide on August 21, 2015.

In 2016, he formed Hamilton Leithauser + Rostam with Hamilton Leithauser of the Walkmen. They released the single "1000 Times" in July 2016, which they performed on The Late Show with Stephen Colbert on September 12, 2016. Their song "In a Black Out" was featured in a commercial for the Apple iPhone 7. Their debut album, I Had a Dream That You Were Mine, was released on September 23, 2016.

Batmanglij produced and co-wrote the song "Listen to Your Friends" from English singer Declan McKenna's debut album, What Do You Think About the Car?, which was released in July 2017.

== Recognition ==
In 2018 he was described by Stereogum as one of the greatest pop and indie-rock producers of his generation.

== Personal life ==
Batmanglij is gay and talked about his sexual orientation in the magazine Out. In an Instagram post in 2015, he said that Ed Droste of the band Grizzly Bear influenced his decision to publicly come out.

== Discography ==
=== Solo work ===
==== Albums ====
- Half-Light (2017)
- Changephobia (2021)
- American Stories (2026)

==== Singles ====
Title	Year	Album
"Wood" (commercially reissued in 2016)	2011	Half-Light
"Don't Let It Get to You"	2011	Half-Light
"EOS"	2016	Half-Light
"Gravity Don't Pull Me"	2016	non-album single
"Gwan"	2017	Half-Light
"Bike Dream"	2017	Half-Light
"Half-Light" (featuring Kelly Zutrau)	2017	Half-Light
"In a River"	2018	non-album single
"Unfold You"	2020	Changephobia
"These Kids We Knew"	2021	Changephobia
"4Runner"	2021	Changephobia
"Changephobia"	2021	Changephobia
"From the Back of a Cab"	2021	Changephobia
"Like a Spark"	2026	American Stories
"Hardy" (featuring Clairo)	2026	American Stories

=== With Vampire Weekend ===
- Vampire Weekend (2008)
- Contra (2010)
- Modern Vampires of the City (2013)

=== As primary producer ===
Clairo

- Immunity (2019)

Discovery

- LP (2009)

Georgia

- Euphoric (2023)

Hamilton Leithauser and Rostam

- I Had a Dream That You Were Mine (2016)

Haim

- Women in Music Pt. III (2020)
- I Quit (2025)

Vagabon

- Sorry I Haven't Called (2023)

=== Other contributions ===
Title	Year	Lead artist	Album	Credit(s)							
Title	Year	Lead artist	Album	Writing	Production	Instrumentation	Vocals	Arrangement	Engineering	Mixing	Mastering
"Two Young Sheeps"	2006	Dirty Projectors	New Attitude			Flute, percussion					
"You and Your Heart (Boys Like Us Remix)"	2010	Jack Johnson	To the Sea		Remix						
"What To Say (Boys Like Us Remix)"	2010	Born Ruffians	Say It		Remix						
"Boots of Danger (Boys Like Us Remix)"	2010	Tokyo Police Club	Champ		Remix						
"White Knuckles (Boys Like Us Remix)"	2010	OK Go	Twelve Remixes of Four Songs		Remix						
"The Trick"	2011	Das Racist	Relax		Yes						
"Robin Egg Blue (Gun Drum Mix)"	2011	Cass McCombs	Humor Risk		Remix						
"Completely Not Me"	2014	Jenny Lewis	Girls, Volume 2: All Adventurous Women Do...	Yes							
"Alexandra"	2014	Hamilton Leithauser	Black Hours	Yes	Yes	Acoustic guitar, harmonica, piano, harpsichord, tambourine, shaker	Backing		Yes		
"I Retired"	2014	Hamilton Leithauser	Black Hours	Yes	Yes	Slide guitar, piano, electric bass, harpsichord, tambourine, shaker	Shoo-bi-do-waps		Yes		
"Wedding Day"	2014	Anand Wilder & Maxwell Kardon	Break Line				Backing	Additional			
"Kingdom" (featuring Simon Le Bon)	2014	Charli XCX	The Hunger Games: Mockingjay, Part 1 – Original Motion Picture Soundtrack	Yes	Yes						
"Need Ur Luv"	2014	Charli XCX	Sucker	Yes	Yes						
"Die Tonight"	2014	Charli XCX	Sucker	Yes							
"Warm Blood"	2015	Carly Rae Jepsen	Emotion	Yes	Yes	Drum and synth programming, keyboards, piano			Yes		
"Water"	2016	Ra Ra Riot	Need Your Light	Yes	Yes	Drum and synth programming, synthesizer, percussion, arrangement		Yes	Yes	Yes	
"I Need Your Light"	2016	Ra Ra Riot	Need Your Light	Yes	Yes	Drum and synth programming, hi-hat, bass, guitar			Yes	Yes	
"Big Boss Big Time Business"	2016	Santigold	99¢	Yes	Additional						
"Chasing Shadows"	2016	Santigold	99¢	Yes	Yes					Yes	
"Outside the War"	2016	Santigold	99¢	Yes		Keyboards					
"Run the Races"	2016	Santigold	99¢	Yes	Co						
"Who I Thought You Were"	2016	Santigold	99¢			Synthesizer, programming					
"Beating Myself Up"	2016	CuckooLander	non-album single	Yes	Yes	Guitar, drum and synth programming, keyboards, piano, tambourine		Yes	Yes	Yes	
"Ivy"	2016	Frank Ocean	Blonde		Yes			Yes			
"Seigfried"	2016	Frank Ocean	Blonde	Yes		Keyboards					
"Comeback"	2016	Francis and the Lights	Farewell, Starlite!	Yes	Yes						
"My City's Gone"	2016	Francis and the Lights	Farewell, Starlite!	Yes	Yes						
"Friends"	2016	Francis and the Lights	Farewell, Starlite!	Yes	Yes						
"My House"	2016	Tokyo Police Club	Melon Collie and the Infinite Radness: Part Two		Yes	Keyboards	Backing			Yes	
"F.U.B.U."	2016	Solange	A Seat at the Table		Additional horn	Piano, organ, shaker					
"Hand in the Fire" (featuring Charli XCX)	2016	Mr. Oizo	All Wet	Yes							
"Little of Your Love"	2017	Haim	Something to Tell You		Additional						
"Kept Me Crying"	2017	Haim	Something to Tell You	Yes	Yes	Synthesizer, piano			Yes		
"Found It in Silence"	2017	Haim	Something to Tell You		Additional	Synthesizer, acoustic guitar					
"Walking Away"	2017	Haim	Something to Tell You	Yes	Yes	Drum programming, synthesizer, organ	Backing		Yes		
"Water's Running Dry"	2017	Haim	Something to Tell You	Yes	Yes	Synthesizer, acoustic guitar, electric guitar, Moog bass		String			
"This Song" (featuring Rostam)	2017	RAC	EGO	Yes	Yes		Featured		Yes		
"Listen to Your Friends"	2017	Declan McKenna	What Do You Think About the Car?	Yes	Yes						
"Deadstream (Rostam version)" (featuring Charli XCX)	2017	Jim-E Stack	It's Jim-ee		Yes		Yes				
"Moments Noticed"	2017	Jim-E Stack	It's Jim-ee		Additional						
"Cane" (featuring Ibeyi)	2018	Everything is Recorded	Everything is Recorded by Richard Russell			Synthesizer					
"Hard Rain"	2018	Lykke Li	So Sad So Sexy	Yes	Yes	Piano, programming, synthesizer	Backing				
"Fallingwater"	2018	Maggie Rogers	Heard It in a Past Life	Yes	Yes	Piano, drums, programming, synthesizer, guitar, shaker	Backing		Yes		
"Do You Wanna Dance?"	2018	Cosha	R.I.P. Bonzai	Yes	Yes	Guitar, programming, synthesizer	Backing		Yes	Yes	
"LUV"	2018	Cosha	R.I.P. Bonzai	Yes	Yes	Guitar, programming, synthesizer	Backing		Yes	Yes	
"You're Not Wrong"	2018	Wet	Still Run		Yes	Synthesizer, piano, electric guitar, bass			Yes		
"This Woman Loves You"	2018	Wet	Still Run		Yes	Acoustic guitar, drums, electric guitar, Mandolin, slide guitar, synthesizer			Yes		
"Harmony Hall"	2019	Vampire Weekend	Father of the Bride		Additional						
"We Belong Together" (featuring Danielle Haim)	2019	Vampire Weekend	Father of the Bride	Yes	Yes				Yes	Yes	
"Queen" (featuring Mxmtoon)	2021	G Flip	non-album single	Yes	Yes						
"Run the Track"	2021	Cosha	Mt. Pleasant	Yes	Co						
"My House"	2021	Declan McKenna	non-album single				Backing				
"Concrete"	2021	Orion Sun	Getaway EP	Yes	Yes						
"25/8"	2022	Cautious Clay	Deadpan Love	Yes	Co						
"Time Flies"	2022	Raveena	Asha's Awakening	Yes	Yes	Electric guitar, synthesizers, synth bass, drum programming, electric sitar, mellotron, Wurlitzer, electric bass					Yes
"Never Ending"	2022	Benee	Lychee EP	Yes	Yes	Electric guitar, acoustic guitar, drum programming, electric bass			Yes		
"Fired"	2022	Remi Wolf	Juno	Yes							
"My Horror"	2022	Santigold	Spirituals	Yes	Co						
"Ushers of the New World"	2022	Santigold	Spirituals	Yes	Co						
"Fall First"	2022	Santigold	Spirituals	Yes							
"Western Wind"	2022	Carly Rae Jepsen	The Loneliest Time	Yes	Yes	Electric guitar, acoustic guitar, bass, drums, piano, organ, claps, shaker, tambourine, conga, synthesizer, programmer			Yes		
"Go Find Yourself or Whatever"	2022	Carly Rae Jepsen	The Loneliest Time	Yes	Yes	Electric guitar, acoustic guitar, bass, drum programming, piano, synthesizer, Hammond B3, mandolin, percussion, sitar					
"Mad At Me"	2023	Samia	Honey	Yes	Yes						
"Till We Meet Again"	2023	Danielle Haim	A Small Light (Songs from the Limited Series)		Co	Guitar, synthesizer					
"Home"	2023	HAIM	Barbie the Album	Yes	Yes	12-string electric guitar, synthesizer, bass synthesizer, drum programmer, piano		String	Yes		
"After Last Night"	2023	Carly Rae Jepsen	The Loveliest Time	Yes	Yes	Percussion, strings, synthesizer, drum machine, drum programmer			Yes		
"Shadow"	2023	Carly Rae Jepsen	The Loveliest Time	Yes	Yes	Percussion, synthesizer, bass synthesizer, drum programmer			Yes		
"Simple"	2025	Sung Holly	non-album single		Yes						

=== Compositions for film and theatre ===
- Sound of My Voice (2011) – film score
- The East (2013) – "Doc's Song" (original piano composition for the film)
- This Is Our Youth (Steppenwolf production on Broadway, fall 2014) – original score
- The OA (television series) (2016) – main theme and score
- The Persian Version (2023) – score
