= Evermore =

Studio album by Taylor Swift
- Released: December 11, 2020
- Recorded: 2020
- Studios: Kitty Committee (Los Angeles); Long Pond (Hudson Valley); Scarlet Pimpernel (Devon)
- Genres: Alt-pop; chamber rock; folk-pop; indie folk; indie rock
- Length: 60:38
- Label: Republic
- Producers: Aaron Dessner; Taylor Swift; Jack Antonoff; Bryce Dessner

Taylor Swift chronology
Folklore: The Long Pond Studio Sessions (2020)	Evermore (2020)	Fearless (Taylor's Version) (2021)

Singles from Evermore
- 1. "Willow" Released: December 11, 2020; 2. "No Body, No Crime" Released: January 11, 2021; 3. "Coney Island" Released: January 18, 2021

Evermore (stylized in all lowercase) is the ninth studio album by the American singer-songwriter Taylor Swift. It was surprise-released on December 11, 2020, through Republic Records. Swift conceived Evermore as a "sister record" to its predecessor, Folklore, which had been released in July. She recorded Evermore mainly with Aaron Dessner at his Long Pond Studio in the Hudson Valley.

Evermore expands on Folklore's escapist fantasy songwriting with fictional narratives and delves into the imaginary world Swift had ideated while self-isolating during the COVID-19 pandemic. The lyrics depict uneasy emotions like longing, grief, nostalgia, and regret, which stem from unhappy endings caused by complications like forbidden love, divorce, and infidelity. Evermore features an acoustic and atmospheric alternative pop, chamber rock, folk-pop, indie folk, and indie rock soundscape. Its spare arrangements and orchestrations consist of fingerpicked guitars, pianos, strings, subtle synths, and programmed drums. Haim, the National, and Bon Iver appear as featured artists.

Evermore was supported by three singles, each released to a different radio format in the United States. "Willow", released to contemporary hit radio, peaked atop the Billboard Hot 100 chart, while "No Body, No Crime" and "Coney Island" were released to country and alternative radio. Evermore reached number one and was certified multi-platinum in Australia, Canada, New Zealand, the United Kingdom, and the United States. In the lattermost, it was also the best-selling alternative album of 2021.

Music critics opined that Evermore was musically bold and experimental while expanding on the styles of Folklore. Many reviews lauded Swift's songwriting, deeming the character studies intricate and the narratives well-constructed. Some were more reserved in their praise and considered the album less groundbreaking than its predecessor. Evermore appeared in various publications' rankings of the best albums of 2020, and some listed it alongside Folklore. At the 64th Annual Grammy Awards in 2022, Evermore was nominated for Album of the Year.

== Background ==
Taylor Swift wrote and produced her eighth studio album, Folklore, while self-isolating during the COVID-19 lockdowns in 2020. It was released on July 24, 2020, via Republic Records. She worked on half of the album with Jack Antonoff, whom she had collaborated with since 2014, and the other half with Aaron Dessner of the National, a first-time collaborator. Swift had been fond of Dessner's works for the National and reached out to him to collaborate in April 2020, without requesting a specific sound. Dessner thought that the National's 2019 album I Am Easy to Find could have been a subconscious influence.

Other first-time collaborators were Dessner's brother Bryce Dessner, (Note: For consistency and clarity, this article hereafter refers to Aaron Dessner as "Dessner", and Bryce Dessner as "Bryce".) who orchestrated multiple tracks; Justin Vernon of the indie folk band Bon Iver, and Joe Alwyn (credited under the pseudonym William Bowery)—her boyfriend at the time—who co-wrote various songs. Due to lockdown restrictions, Swift recorded her vocals in her home studio in Los Angeles and sent audio files to Dessner and Antonoff, who operated from their studios on the United States East Coast. Folklore's indie folk and alternative rock sounds, and its fictional songwriting with imaginary characters and narratives, were new aspects of Swift's artistry. The critical acclaim that Folklore received encouraged Swift to continue experimenting with its styles.

In September 2020, Swift, Antonoff, and Dessner convened to film the documentary Folklore: The Long Pond Studio Sessions in person at Dessner's Long Pond Studios in the Hudson Valley, one of the recording locations of Folklore. After filming, the three continued writing songs spontaneously during their stay at Long Pond. Dessner described their collaboration as a "weird avalanche" and a natural extension of their work on Folklore, but with more room for experimentation, as the two did not subject themselves to limitations. He sent Swift instrumentals, and she wrote the lyrics to them and sent the songs back to him. After Swift, Alwyn, and Vernon had written the song "Evermore", Dessner concluded that they were working on a new album.

== Writing and recording ==
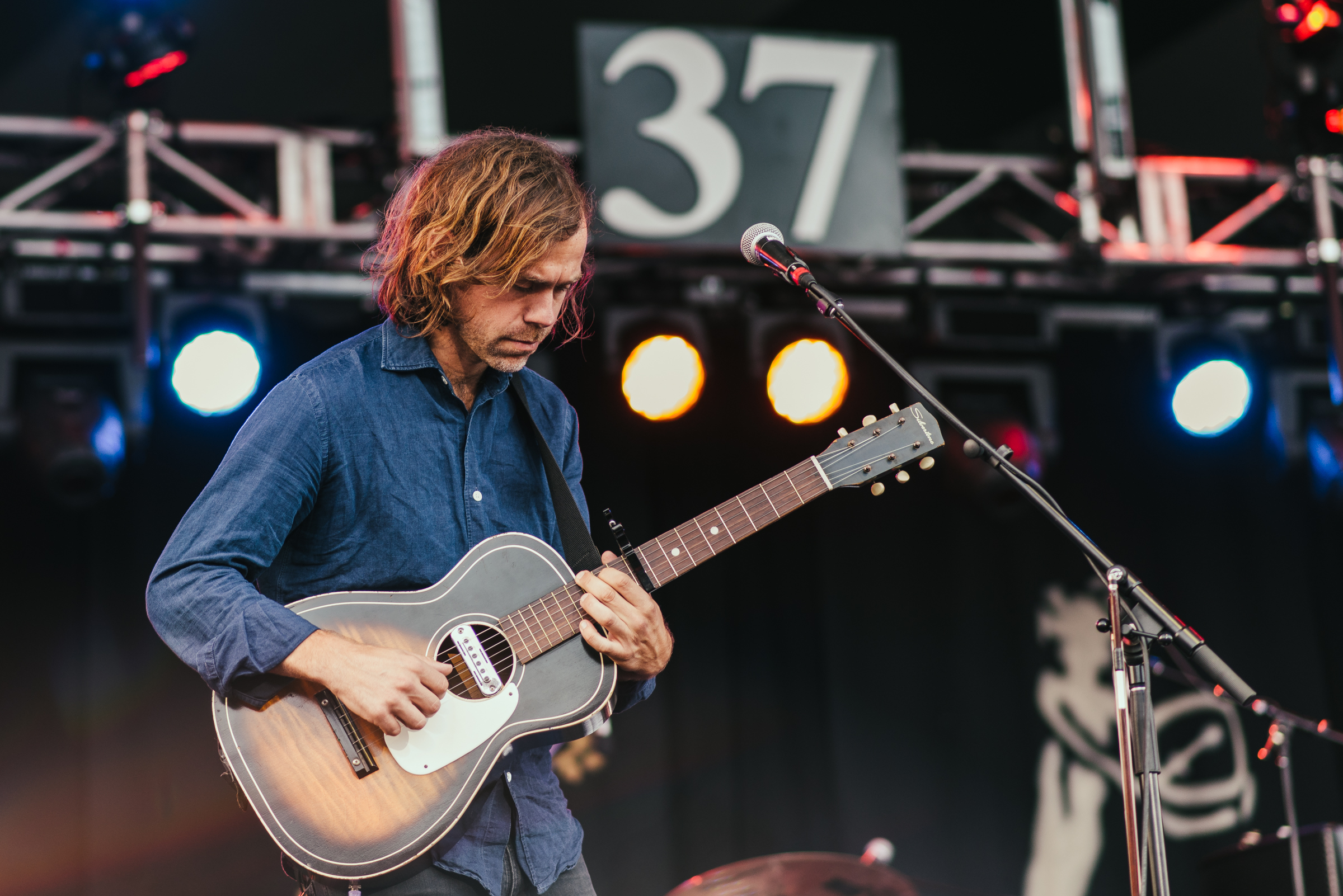
Swift recorded much of Evermore with Aaron Dessner (pictured in 2016) at his Long Pond Studio in the Hudson Valley.

On Evermore's standard edition, Dessner produced 14 tracks (including four co-produced with Swift and one with Bryce), and Antonoff co-produced one with Swift. According to Dessner, he was attuned to Swift's way of structuring a song with verses, refrains, and bridges, and thus did not edit her outputs much. While her vocals for Folklore were processed remotely, Swift recorded many of her vocals for Evermore in person at Long Pond, using Dessner's Telefunken microphone and Siemens preamplifiers. In late 2020, when COVID restrictions kept studios closed in England, Dessner arranged for her to quarantine and record an extended session at Scarlet Pimpernel Studios at Marcus Mumford's home in Devon. According to Swift, she recorded "five or six" songs during this stay. Other collaborators, such as Vernon and Bryce, collaborated virtually due to pandemic restrictions. Given Swift's international popularity, they recorded the album in secrecy, using passwords, data encryption, and specific communications when sharing mixes of the tracks. For songs that feature orchestration, Dessner sent Bryce chord charts, and Bryce orchestrated the songs from his studio in Biarritz, France, before sending them back to Dessner, who then coordinated other musicians to record instruments individually from their home studios.

Various Evermore tracks were created from scratch. Swift wrote two tracks, "Closure" and "Dorothea", for Dessner and Vernon's supergroup Big Red Machine; the songs were eventually recorded for Evermore. For "Closure", Vernon played a drum loop, and Dessner added piano, imagining it as a track in 5/4 time. Dessner pinpointed "Closure" as the track that opened up more possibilities for the album, in that Swift and the production team did not subject themselves to any limitations. Dessner composed "Westerly", an instrumental track named after the town of Westerly, where Swift's Rhode Island home is located. Swift subsequently spent an hour writing what became "Willow" on that instrumental. "No Body, No Crime" is the only Evermore track that Swift wrote without collaborators; she wrote it on a rubber-bridge guitar and sent Dessner a voice memo, which he produced. The track's feature artist, the pop rock band Haim, recorded their vocals at Ariel Rechtshaid's Los Angeles home and forwarded them to Swift and Dessner.

Other tracks were Dessner's works he had created for his own projects or Folklore. "'Tis the Damn Season" was a product of Swift's songwriting while she was drunk and Dessner's instrumental track, which he had written "a long time ago". "Coney Island" was based on a track that Dessner and Bryce had written for the National. Swift and Alwyn wrote the lyrics to it, and the National's lead singer, Matt Berninger, duetted with Swift while other members played instruments, including the drums, pocket piano, and bass. The bridge of "Marjorie" samples the drone from Folklore's "Peace"; Swift wrote "Marjorie" about her maternal grandmother, Marjorie Finlay, whose operatic vocals were also sampled. Dessner had started composing "Right Where You Left Me" and "Happiness" for Big Red Machine in 2019. Swift finished writing and recording the two songs as the last two for Evermore; "Happiness" was completed six days before the album was mastered. All 17 tracks were mixed by Jonathan Low at Long Pond.

== Composition ==
=== Music and production ===
"Willow"
Evermore expands on the folk sounds of Folklore, as demonstrated with "Willow", a folk song instrumented with picked guitars and orchestral accents.

Swift envisioned Evermore as a nostalgic fall and winter album, as opposed to Folklore as a spring and summer record. As with Folklore, Evermore explores atmospheric folk and indie rock styles that were different from Swift's previous country and synth-pop releases, showcased through the subdued and nuanced production and relaxed pacing over straightforward, arena-friendly hooks. The album incorporates acoustic and atmospheric alternative pop, chamber rock, folk-pop, indie folk, and indie rock styles, with chamber pop embellishments, bringing forth an introspective listening experience. The music critic Steven Hyden wrote in Uproxx that the album exuded "wintery-country vibes". Comparing Evermore to Folklore, Stereogum's Tom Breihan opined that the music of Evermore is straightforward "indie", while that of Folklore is "indie"–styled pop music.

Dessner's compositions are based on both acoustic and electronic instruments, largely characterized by programmed drum sounds using the iOS app FunkBox or analog drum generators such as the Vermona DRM1, the Roland TR-8 and TR-8s, and the Teenage Engineering OP-1; layered electric guitars; and piano-based arrangements using a Yamaha U1 upright piano. Bryce added orchestration to 13 songs.Evermore retains Folklore's minimal soundscape, spare arrangements, and ambiguous dynamic structures, but is less consistent and more experimental than the latter: Evermore has a more spacious ambience and its songs contain looser structures and textures and use varied instruments, namely fingerpicked or plucked guitars, glockenspiel, modular synthesizers, strings, and subtle layers of Mellotrons, French horns, and flutes.

Swift's vocals in Evermore are generally breathy and soft, accompanied by layered backing vocals, and deliver the songs in a conversational tone. In a profile for Sound on Sound, Tom Doyle wrote that Swift's voice "is very much front and centre and high in the mix, and generally sounds fairly dry". Dessner processed Swift's vocals such that they retained what he described as a "warmth" that he found lacking in "pop-oriented records" to sound "very bright and [...] cut really well on the radio". The final song mixes were often the unedited mixes, such as the case of "Willow": Dessner said that the production team "settled back almost to the point where it began". According to the music theory professor Alyssa Barna, both Swift's singing and the song's arrangements embrace flat dynamics with little shifts in tempo or volume, and a static timbre that remains consistent throughout each track: her timbre sounds "breathy and bright" when she sings in her upper register and "full and dark" in her lower.

=== Lyrics and themes ===
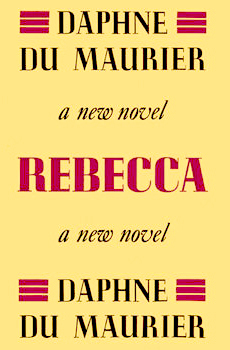
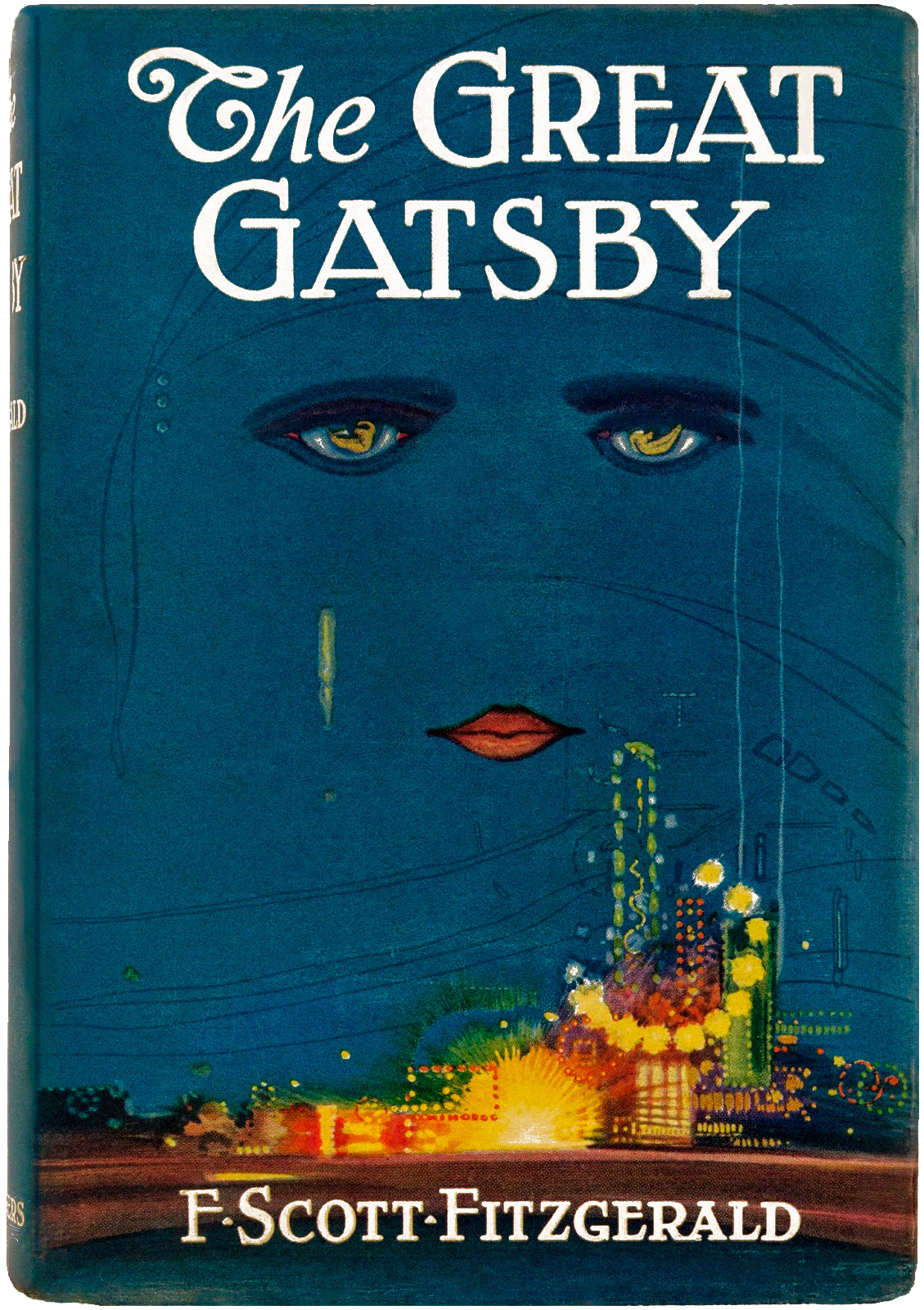
Evermore's literary influences include Daphne du Maurier's 1938 novel Rebecca on "Tolerate It", and F. Scott Fitzgerald's 1925 novel The Great Gatsby on "Happiness".

Evermore expanded on the imaginary world that Swift had ideated when creating Folklore: its songs incorporate fictional narratives and characters not based on Swift's personal experience—a deviation from the autobiographical songwriting that she had been known for. Evermore contains intertextual concepts, language, and imagery with Folklore, such as fragmented memories, cabin-like settings, and shifting scenes of nature, including seascapes, forests, cliffs, and cosmic phenomena. Also in the same vein as Folklore, Evermore was influenced by authors of modernist literature, such as the poets Robert Frost ("'Tis the Damn Season") and Emily Dickinson ("Ivy"), and the writer F. Scott Fitzgerald ("Happiness").

In an Apple Music interview with Zane Lowe in December 2020, Swift detailed the relationship between Folklore and Evermore, which she designated as "sister records": whereas Folklore deals with "conflict resolution" and reconciliations, Evermore explores "endings of all sorts, sizes and shapes" and the painful aftermath. It details multiple themes related to unfulfilled romance—forbidden love, neglect, divorce, and infidelity—in addition to other painful endings such as fallen friendships and unrealized self-actualization. Narrated from the perspectives of complicated women who construct their stories from distant or recent memories, the songs are set in winter, particularly events related to the Christmas and holiday season such as returning to one's hometown during a weekend, a Christmas dinner, and a wrenching December that leaves one "feeling unmoored", as depicted in the title track.

Slate's Carl Wilson dubbed Evermore an anthology without an integrated storyline, while Hyden and The A.V. Club's Annie Zaleski contended that the wintry settings established a coherent throughline. Compared to the restraint of Folklore, Evermore is more uninhibited and playful, demonstrated through tracks like "No Body, No Crime", "Long Story Short", and "Dorothea", although most of the songs' narratives do not have happy endings. The overall mood of Evermore, nonetheless, is hopeful and warm, amidst the wintry settings and bittersweet feelings. In the view of the English literature scholar Maria Juko, while the title Evermore suggests the lasting legacy of the tales that have become folklore, the album's content questions the concept of eternity.

Despite its escapist fantasy concept, Evermore not only includes purely fictional stories but also narratives informed by Swift's biographical influences—as demonstrated by the song "Marjorie". This type of narrative is autofiction—a combination of autobiography and fiction that presents perspectives of Swift's alter egos rather than her own self. Swift said that although there is an element of fiction to most of the songs, she still found herself in them. Commenting on Swift's framing of Evermore as a departure from her previous confessional, first-person songwriting, The New Yorker's Amanda Petrusich argued that every kind of writing is "an invention of sorts, honed and sharpened and shaped to fit a particular narrative".

=== Songs ===
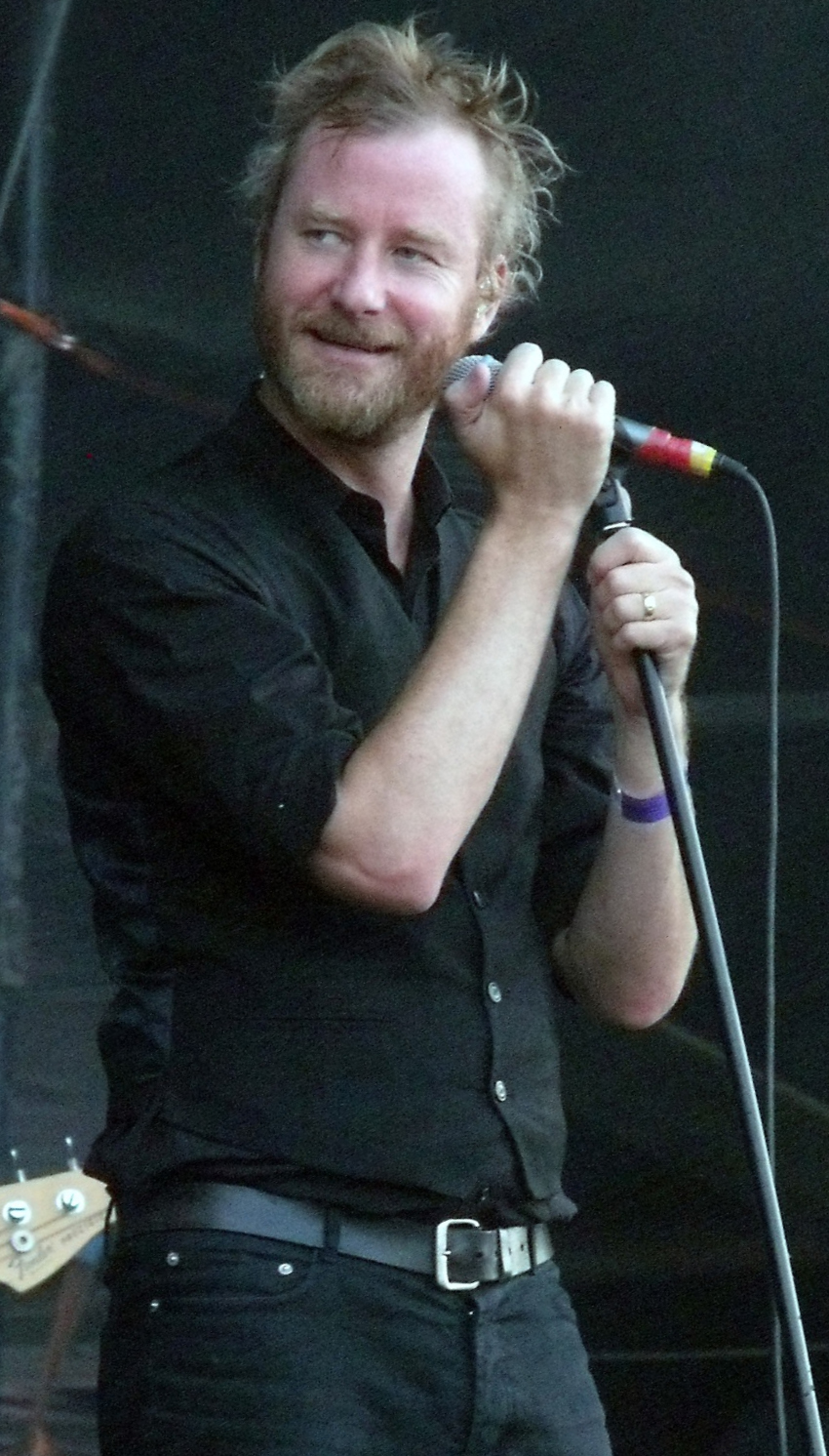
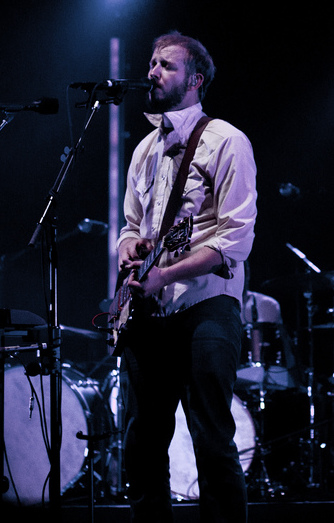
Matt Berninger (left, pictured in 2011) duets with Swift in "Coney Island", and Justin Vernon (right, 2011) in "Evermore".

"Willow" is an ambient folk ballad instrumented with picked guitars and orchestral accents, and its lyrics describe the unexplainable magic that happens when the narrator connects romantically with another person; Swift described the song as "witchy" and likened it to a spell that could make somebody fall in love. "Champagne Problems" is a mid-tempo piano ballad with a spacious arrangement, composed of oompah piano chords, a guitar arpeggio, and backing vocals singing "ah". In the song, the narrator is a woman who has turned down her boyfriend's marriage proposal: he was so confident that things would go well, he had told his family about his wedding plans, but she could not give a reason for turning him down and hopes that he will find someone else more compatible. "Gold Rush" is a chamber pop track with influences of 1980s synth-pop; it incorporates drums, horns, strings, and Mellotron over insistent, pulsing beats. The narrator in "Gold Rush" is infatuated with a subject so attractive that everyone else falls in love with them, and she is insecure about her own qualities, until she wakes from her daydream and concludes that it is best not to pursue this connection.

"'Tis the Damn Season" details a female character named Dorothea and her return to her hometown, Tupelo, during the Christmas holiday. Dorothea rekindles with a lover from her high school days and wonders whether leaving her hometown for an acting career in Los Angeles was the right move. The spare arrangement of "'Tis the Damn Season" combines a fingerpicked electric guitar riff and strings to evoke a nostalgic soundscape. Dessner and Bryce composed "Tolerate It" in 10/8, an odd time signature. The song is built on insistent programmed drum beats, an orchestration, and somber piano to depict the difficulties of loving someone "ambivalent", as described by Swift, inspired by Daphne du Maurier's 1938 novel Rebecca. The lyrics describe the young female narrator as yearning and in agony, and the male subject, who is much older, as aloof and unappreciative. "No Body, No Crime" combines Americana and roots music styles such as country, folk, and old-school rock and roll, featuring police sirens, a harmonica in the background, and a twang in Swift's vocals. Lyrically, it is a murder ballad that details a revenge plotted by a friend of a fictional character named Este, whom her husband murdered: this friend kills the husband and frames his mistress for the crime.

"Happiness" is a melancholic, ambient ballad that incorporates synths, guitars, pianos, and church organs, building from a soft drone to a soaring climax. The lyrics of "Happiness" tell the story of how a female narrator consoles herself and her ex-husband, navigating the aftermath of a divorce from their seven-year marriage; they draw parallels with the narrative of F. Scott Fitzgerald's 1925 novel The Great Gatsby and directly reference the novel through Swift's description of the female narrator as "a beautiful fool" and invocation of the "green light" on Daisy Buchanan's dock beckoning Jay Gatsby. An acoustic Americana and folk song, "Dorothea" is instrumented by a honky-tonk piano, tambourines, and guitars; it is narrated from the perspective of the male subject in "'Tis the Damn Season": he grew up with Dorothea in Tupelo and remains in their hometown but still longs for her and has observed her achievements from afar, wondering what it would be if they returned to the simple rural life before. "Coney Island" is an alternative rock and indie folk song featuring Swift singing with melodious vocals and duetting with Berninger, who uses his baritone. Lyrically, it is a couple's nostalgic recount of their past romance in Coney Island.

"Ivy"
The wintry soundscape of Evermore is portrayed through production choices like the faint sleigh bells in "Ivy", which also features lightweight guitar riffs, banjos, trumpet, and gentle vocal harmonies.

"Ivy" is a folk song with lightweight guitar riffs, faint sleigh bells, banjos, trumpet, and Vernon's gentle vocal harmonies. The lyrics of "Ivy" are about infidelity: a married person is in love with someone who is not their spouse, and their extramarital relationship develops from winter through spring, akin to ivy vines growing and winding around the narrator. By the end of the song, the marriage crumbles in a blazing battle due to the affair. In the melancholic track "Cowboy like Me", the narrator falls in love unexpectedly with a fellow con artist: even though both she and the subject had been scamming wealthy people by feigning love, their scheming on each other turned into real feelings, leaving the narrator anxious and heartbroken. Similar to "No Body, No Crime", "Cowboy like Me" evokes strong country music influences; it is instrumented by hushed guitars, harmonica, mandolin, piano, and backing vocals from Marcus Mumford. "Long Story Short" stands out musically from its preceding tracks thanks to its propulsive tempo, frantic drum machine beats, and strong pop influences. In the lyrics, the narrator reflects on her wrong romantic decisions due to low self-esteem, before announcing her present-day relief that she is finally in a healthy relationship.

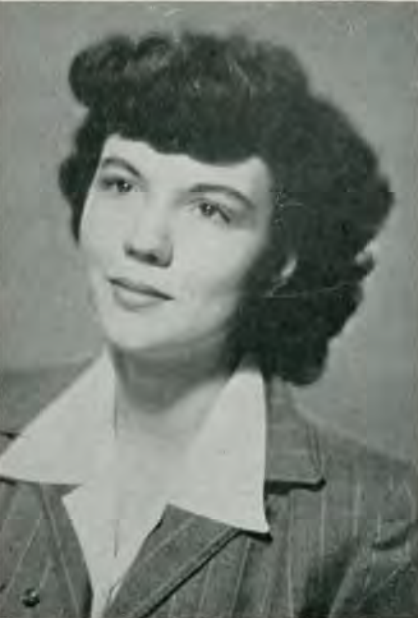
"Marjorie" is a tribute to Swift's maternal grandmother, Marjorie Finlay (pictured in 1949), who was an opera singer.

"Marjorie" is Swift's tribute to her maternal grandmother, Marjorie Finlay, an opera singer who died when Swift was 13. Its lyrics consist of Finlay's advice to her granddaughter, Swift's longing for her grandmother and yearning to keep her memory alive. Its gentle production incorporates rhythmic electronic synth pulses, warm piano, pizzicato strings, and samples Finlay's soprano vocals, taken from old records of her singing that Swift found. "Closure", described by various critics as the most experimental track on Evermore, is built in 5/4, an odd time signature. Its instrumentation incorporates clattering, industrial-sounding electro-rock drums and acoustic piano. The lyrics of "Closure" are directed at a pretentious ex-lover: the narrator finds their act of reaching out patronizing, telling the ex-lover that there is no need for them to act out of pretentious amity. The album's closing track for the standard edition, "Evermore", is a piano ballad that progresses into a dramatic bridge with a tempo shift, where Swift is joined midway by Vernon's multitracked falsetto in a call and response. In the lyrics, Swift's narrator struggles through the dark days of November and December and eventually realizes that all the pain and depression is not permanent; she was influenced by the tough times she went through in 2016 and the uncertainty surrounding the 2020 US elections. (Note: According to Swift, she "went through a lot of bad stuff in 2016, like July, November, all those times were just taking it day by day to get through".)

The two bonus tracks of Evermore, "Right Where You Left Me" and "It's Time To Go", expand on the indie folk sound. "Right Where You Left Me" is a folk-pop track with country influences, incorporating banjo, harmonica, harmonium, and twangy guitars that distort towards the conclusion. It depicts a female narrator's entrapment in heartbreak: she is still hurt over the moment that her ex-boyfriend left her in a restaurant years ago, comparing her own existence to that of a ghost, frozen in time, using imagery of dim lights, dropped hairpins, shattered glasses, and collected dust. In "It's Time to Go", the narrator details her decisions to leave an unhappy marriage in the first verse, to exit a toxic work environment in the second, and to stand up against a greedy person who had imprisoned her in the third. Musically, the track begins as an indie pop song set against insistent piano and one-note guitar sounds, before surging at the end with drums and slide guitar.

== Release and promotion ==
Swift announced Evermore, including the cover artwork and track listing, on December 10, 2020, as her second surprise album of 2020 after Folklore. The album title and its track titles are stylized in all lowercase; Juko commented that this stylization evokes the continuation of folk tales: the songs' narratives have no definite beginning and instead form a collection of fragmented stories.

The artwork shows Swift standing with her back to the camera, looking over a barren field with trees in the distance. She is wearing a French braid and a checked flannel coat from a collection by the English designer Stella McCartney, which sold out hours after the album's announcement. As with Folklore, Evermore embraces a cottagecore aesthetic that reflected the escapist fantasy content, which resonated with many listeners seeking comfort during the pandemic, and represented Swift's effort to reinvent her image. In the view of the English literature scholar Ryan Hibbett, the cover art shows Swift as a "fellow-spectator and thinker" rather than as an object of sexualization common to pop stars.

=== Distribution and singles ===
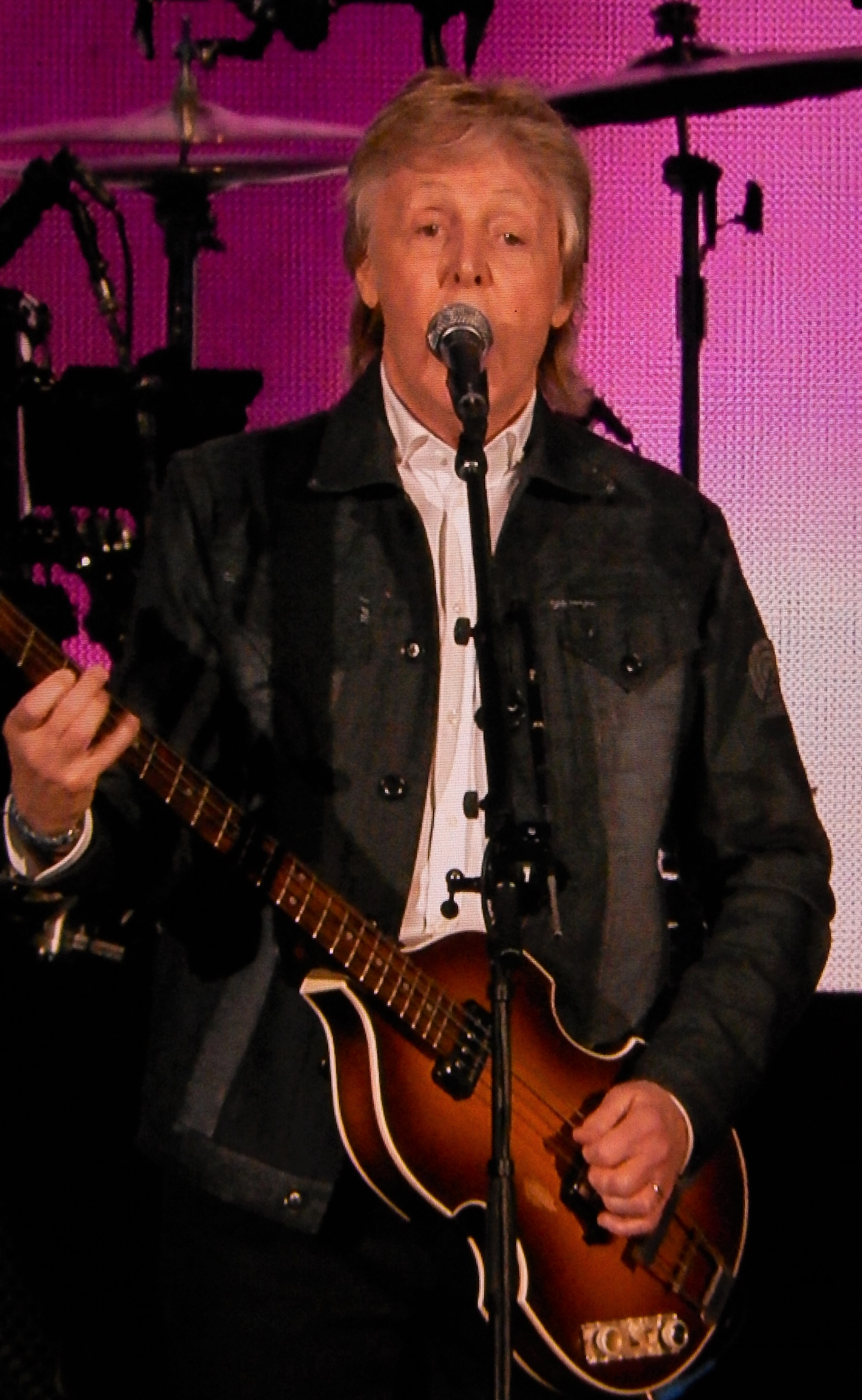
Paul McCartney (pictured in 2019) delayed the release of his album McCartney III by one week out of respect to Swift's release of Evermore.

The standard edition of Evermore was released on December 11, 2020, for download and on streaming platforms, through Republic Records. Due to the surprise release and the time it took to manufacture physical albums, Evermore had delayed releases on physical formats: the CD edition was released on December 18, 2020; followed by cassette on February 12, 2021; and vinyl LP on May 28, 2021. The deluxe edition, which contains the two bonus tracks previously relegated to physical releases, was made available for streaming on January 7, 2021. A limited number of autographed CDs were sold at select independent record stores. Swift released three streaming-exclusive playlists, each consisting of six tracks taken from Evermore and Folklore, and described them as "chapters" based on the songs' collective theme: Dropped Your Hand While Dancing, Forever Is the Sweetest Con, and Ladies Lunching.

Evermore was supported by three singles, each released to a different radio format in the United States—a strategy Swift had implemented for Folklore. "Willow" was released to adult contemporary and pop radio, and its music video was unveiled the same day as the album's release. It was accompanied by seven official remixes. "Willow" debuted at number one on the Billboard Hot 100 chart and peaked atop the Adult Pop Airplay chart in the United States, and it also debuted atop the Australian ARIA Singles Chart. "No Body, No Crime" was released to US country radio on January 11, via Republic in collaboration with MCA Nashville, and "Coney Island" to US adult album alternative radio on January 18, 2021, via Republic.

Swift appeared on Jimmy Kimmel Live! on December 14, 2020, to promote Evermore; she discussed the making of both Folklore and Evermore with the host Jimmy Kimmel. On a December 15, 2020, episode of Howard Stern's SiriusXM radio show, the English singer-songwriter Paul McCartney revealed that Swift had shared with him the planned release of Evermore on December 18 to respect McCartney's planned December 11 release of his album McCartney III. Upon learning this, McCartney decided to release his album on December 18 instead, so that Swift could move forward with her Evermore rollout as initially planned.

=== Theme park lawsuit ===
On February 2, 2021, the theme park Evermore Park in Pleasant Grove, Utah, sued Swift and her team for allegedly infringing its "Evermore" trademark. Seeking to prevent Swift's further use of the word, they demanded statutory damages of $2 million for each "counterfeit mark" on her albums or merchandise. The park sent a cease-and-desist letter to Swift on December 29, 2020, which the singer's team declined to comply with. According to the park, Swift's album title affected its searchability and confused its consumers. Swift's team described the suit as "baseless" and said the confusion between the park's products and Swift's music was "inconceivable".

On February 24, 2021, three weeks after the lawsuit, TAS Rights Management—Swift's copyrights company—countersued the park for allegedly infringing Swift's songs "Love Story", "You Belong with Me", and "Bad Blood" by regularly using them in their performances without a license. In March 2021, a spokesperson for Swift told the press that both parties had agreed to dismiss their respective suits without monetary settlement.

== Commercial performance ==
Republic Records reported that Evermore was Swift's eighth album to sell over a million copies in its first week worldwide. In the United States, it debuted at number one on the Billboard 200 chart dated December 26, 2020, becoming her eighth number-one album. The gap between the number-one debuts of Folklore and Evermore was 140 days, registering the shortest gap between two chart-topping albums by a woman. All the album's 15 tracks entered the Billboard Hot 100 simultaneously; with "Willow" at number one, this marked the second time Swift had both a number-one single and a number-one album the same week, after Folklore and "Cardigan" in 2020. All tracks also debuted on the Hot Rock & Alternative Songs chart, except "No Body, No Crime", which debuted on the Hot Country Songs chart.

Evermore spent four non-consecutive weeks at number one on the Billboard 200, aided by delayed physical releases such as autographed CDs and a record-breaking vinyl sales week: by selling 102,000 vinyl copies for the week ending June 3, 2021, the album jumped 74–1 on the chart and registered the highest single-week vinyl figure since MRC Data began tracking US album sales in 1991. Evermore also debuted atop the Alternative Albums chart, dethroning Folklore; it spent 16 weeks at number one. According to MRC Data, it was the tenth-best-selling album of 2020 in the United States and the sixth-best-selling of 2021. Evermore surpassed one million US album units as of April 2021 and was certified four-times platinum by the Recording Industry Association of America in September 2025.

Evermore also peaked at number one in Flanders, Canada, Greece, New Zealand, and Portugal. In Australia, the album earned a "Chart Double" when it debuted atop the ARIA Albums Chart and "Willow" atop the ARIA Singles Chart; topping the Australian chart 19 weeks after Folklore, it helped Swift register the shortest gap between two number-one albums, surpassing Ariana Grande's record of 25 weeks. In the United Kingdom, Evermore made Swift the female artist with the fastest duration to accumulate six number-one albums (2012–2020), surpassing Madonna (1997–2008); she also became the first female to score six chart toppers in the 21st century. Evermore was the best-selling Americana album of 2021 in the United Kingdom. The album has been certified quadruple platinum in Canada; triple platinum in Brazil and New Zealand; double platinum in Australia, Denmark, and the United Kingdom; and platinum in Austria and Poland.

== Critical reception ==
Professional ratings
Aggregate scores
Source	Rating
AnyDecentMusic?	8.0/10
Metacritic	85/100
Review scores
Source	Rating
AllMusic	4/5 stars
And It Don't Stop	A−
Clash	8/10
Entertainment Weekly	A
The Guardian	4/5 stars
The Independent	4/5 stars
NME	5/5 stars
Pitchfork	7.9/10
Rolling Stone	4.5/5 stars
The Sydney Morning Herald	5/5 stars

Evermore received critical acclaim upon release. On Metacritic, which assigns a normalized score out of 100 to ratings from publications, the album received a weighted mean score of 85 based on 29 reviews, indicating "universal acclaim".

Swift's songwriting received unanimous praise. Reviews from The Independent's Helen Brown, The Guardian's Alexis Petridis, Stereogum's Tom Breihan, and The Sydney Morning Herald's Lancaster Brodie lauded the character studies as intricate for depicting complex emotions with well-written stories, while those from Spin's Bobby Olivier and NME's Hannah Mylrea highlighted Swift's command of language, focusing on her wordplay and turn of phrase. Jon Pareles from The New York Times opined that the character studies of Evermore were more extensive than those in Folklore, and Patrick Ryan of USA Today thought that the imaginary world of Evermore was richer and "more spellbinding". Alan Light of Esquire considered Swift's songwriting mature and "even literary". A less enthusiastic review came from The Atlantic's Spencer Kornhaber, who wrote that there were imprecise and self-indulgent metaphors that could have been edited.

Reception of the production and sounds was not as uniformly positive. On the positive side, multiple critics regarded Evermore as musically riskier and more experimental than Folklore, such as Light, Breihan, and Mylrea. Some considered Evermore a better record than Folklore thanks to this greater musical reach, including Olivier, Zaleski, and Entertainment Weekly's Maura Johnston. There were compliments from Pareles and Rolling Stone's Claire Shaffer, who deemed the production choices nuanced and meticulous. Billboard's Jason Lipshutz and Pitchfork's Sam Sodomsky contended that the production choices complemented Swift's lyrics, while Clash's Shannon McDonagh wrote that Evermore built on what worked on Folklore to greater success. Sodomsky and Variety's critic Chris Willman also praised Swift's expressive and agile vocals; the latter opined that the impressionist narratives fully "come into focus on second or third listen".

Some critics were more reserved in their praise. Brown, Breihan, and Robert Christgau contended that it took time for the melodies to fully draw the listeners in. Multiple reviews regarded Evermore as a sequel to Folklore, and thus it was not as impactful as its predecessor, although they upheld the quality of the songcraft; these included Wilson, Hyden, and Neil McCormick of The Daily Telegraph. The Globe and Mail's Brad Wheeler contended that Evermore was not as tuneful as Folklore but was more "album-oriented" and had a timeless quality. Kitty Empire of The Observer opined that the muted production "smears Vaseline on [Swift's] otherwise keen lens". Mikael Wood of the Los Angeles Times felt that while there were "some incredible songs", many Evermore tracks sounded like leftovers of Folklore, with unfinished experiments both musically and lyrically. In a negative review, Chris Richards of The Washington Post criticized the "indie" label and argued that while Folklore was surprising, Evermore turned out lyrically subpar, with "Marjorie" as the exception.

=== Year-end lists ===
By the time Evermore was released, many publications had already issued their year-end rankings of the best albums of 2020. The album nonetheless managed to appear on multiple lists: it ranked first (shared with Folklore) on lists compiled by NJ.com, USA Today, and Chris Willman of Variety; and within the top 10 by Jon Bream of the Minnesota Star Tribune, The Philadelphia Inquirer, and the Tampa Bay Times. Evermore finished at number 19 on Metacritic's aggregated list of 2020 year-end rankings, based on placements in publications' year-end lists.

Select year-end rankings
Critic/Publication	List	Rank	Ref.
Chris Willman (Variety)	Best Albums of 2020	1 (Note: Shared with Folklore)	
Financial Times	Best 10 Albums of 2020	9	
Metro Times	Best New Music of 2020	2	
NJ.com	The 50 Albums That Saved Us From 2020	1	
Our Culture Mag	The 50 Best Albums of 2020	4	
Robert Christgau	71 Best Albums of 2020	20	
Rob Sheffield (Rolling Stone)	Top 20 Albums of 2020	5	
Slate	The Music Club, 2020 – 13 Best Albums	2	
Tampa Bay Times	The 10 Best Albums of 2020	5	
USA Today	The 10 Best Albums of 2020	1	

== Impact and commentary ==
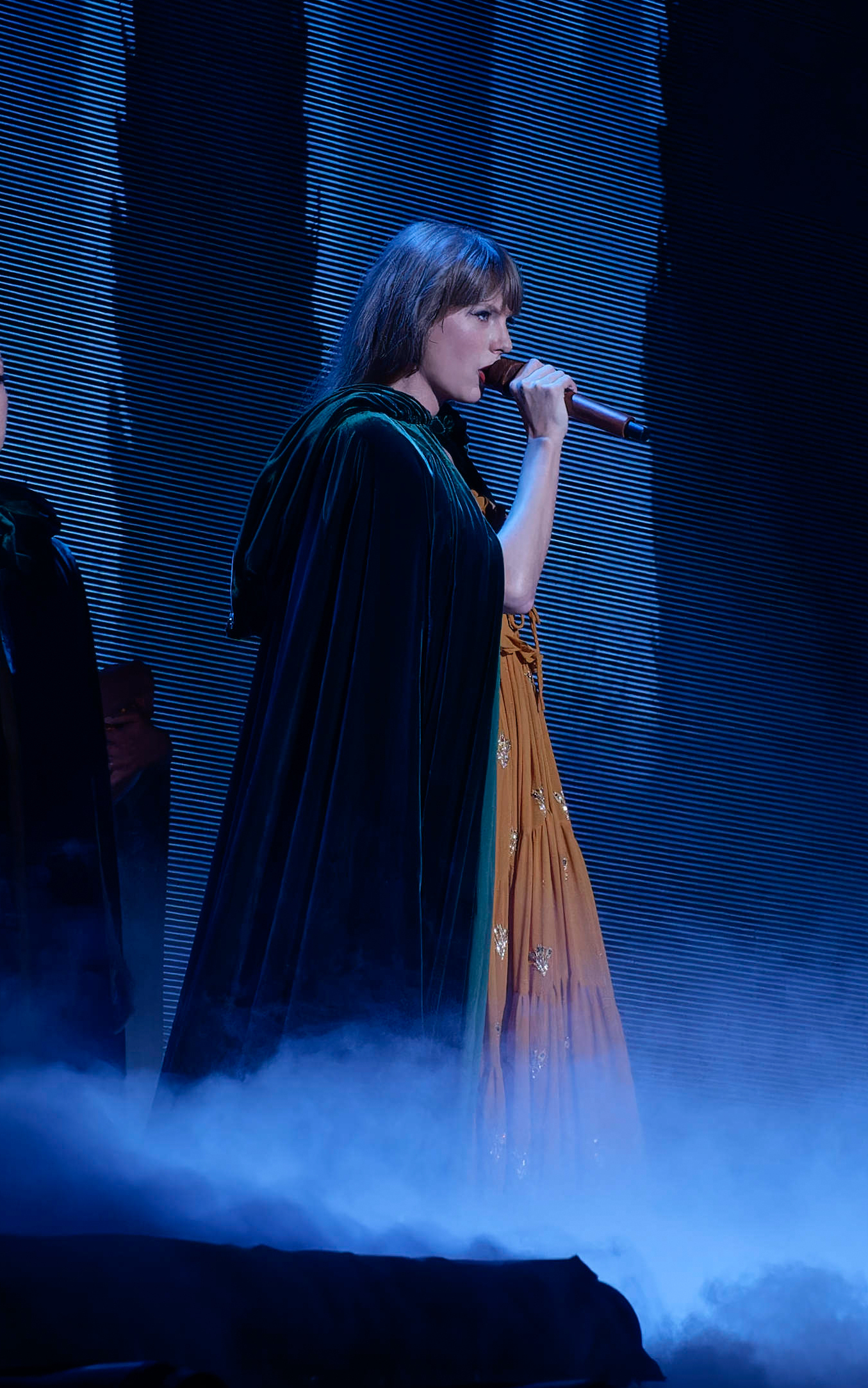
Swift performing "Willow" as part of the Evermore act of the Eras Tour in 2023

At the 2021 American Music Awards, Evermore won the American Music Award for Favorite Pop/Rock Album, marking Swift's record-breaking fourth win in the category. It also helped Swift win Best International Artist at the 2021 ARIA Music Awards in Australia. At the 64th Annual Grammy Awards, Evermore was nominated for Album of the Year, marking Swift's fifth nomination in the category, after Fearless (2008), Red (2012), 1989 (2014), and Folklore. The nomination resulted from the Recording Academy's last-minute decision to expand the number of nominees for Album of the Year from eight to 10, just 24 hours before the nominations were announced. The album was also nominated for International Album of the Year at the Juno Awards of 2021 in Canada.

The five-month gap between Folklore and Evermore received commentary in the press. Willman compared this short gap to the successes of the Beatles and U2 with Achtung Baby (1991) and Zooropa (1993), while Sheffield termed it a "hot streak" reminiscent of Prince in 1987, David Bowie in 1977, and Lil Wayne in 2007. Swift considered releasing Evermore a departure from her previous treatments of albums as "one-off eras" that required careful planning after each release cycle. In the view of Vulture's Justin Curto, by abandoning traditional album rollouts that involve extensive promotion and marketing, Evermore demonstrated Swift's embrace of artistic autonomy, which contributed to a broader discourse on album release strategies in the 2020s. Meanwhile, The Wall Street Journal's Neil Shah argued that the quick rollout was influenced by hip-hop and R&B artists who would release music spontaneously—a strategy that proved lucrative in the streaming era.

Swift included songs from Evermore on the Eras Tour, her sixth headlining concert tour, in 2023, after not touring since 2018's Reputation Stadium Tour due to the pandemic. Evermore, often analyzed together with Folklore, reinvented Swift's image from a pop star to an esteemed songwriter. According to Hibbett, the two albums aligned Swift with both the singer-songwriter tradition of the 1960s and 1970s and the contemporary indie rock scene. In doing so, they represented a paradox of "mainstream alternative" or "high-pop" binaries—contrasts between esteemed, poetic styles and accessible, "pop" styles—which Hibbett contended to have reached an unprecedented level due to Swift's "mega-stardom [that she] brings to the table". Evermore's embrace of the cottagecore aesthetic contributed to Swift's newfound popularity among liberal and queer audiences, who found solace in it to cope with the tumultuous times of American politics that entailed white supremacy, racism, and homophobia. Some critics, however, accused her of cultural appropriation and romanticizing the legacy of settler colonialism of white Americans in the United States.

Sales revenues from Evermore helped Swift become 2020's highest-paid solo musician in the world and highest-paid musician overall in the United States. Many publications attributed Evermore with Swift's status as one of the most prominent artists during the pandemic; Billboard named it as an example of how the pandemic fostered new creative directions for musicians. Artists who have cited Evermore as an influence include Mia Dimšić, who was inspired to write "Guilty Pleasure", her entry song representing Croatia at the Eurovision Song Contest 2022; Christina Perri, who said that it reignited her passion to create melancholic, heartfelt songs without confirming her to making "happy" music; and Noah Kahan, who credited it with providing a mainstream prominence for his "brand of alt-folk". The Independent ranked Evermore 14th on their 2024 list of the 20 most underrated albums; Roisin O'Connor argued that it was "arguably [...] her biggest creative flex".

== Track listing ==
Standard edition
No.	Title	Writer(s)	Producer(s)	Length
1.	"Willow"	Taylor Swift; Aaron Dessner	A. Dessner	3:34
2.	"Champagne Problems"	Swift; William Bowery	Swift; A. Dessner	4:04
3.	"Gold Rush"	Swift; Jack Antonoff	Swift; Antonoff	3:05
4.	"'Tis the Damn Season"	Swift; A. Dessner	A. Dessner	3:49
5.	"Tolerate It"	Swift; A. Dessner	A. Dessner	4:05
6.	"No Body, No Crime" (featuring Haim)	Swift	Swift; A. Dessner	3:35
7.	"Happiness"	Swift; A. Dessner	A. Dessner	5:15
8.	"Dorothea"	Swift; A. Dessner	A. Dessner	3:45
9.	"Coney Island" (featuring the National)	Swift; Bowery; A. Dessner; Bryce Dessner	A. Dessner; B. Dessner	4:35
10.	"Ivy"	Swift; A. Dessner; Antonoff	A. Dessner	4:20
11.	"Cowboy like Me"	Swift; A. Dessner	A. Dessner	4:35
12.	"Long Story Short"	Swift; A. Dessner	A. Dessner	3:35
13.	"Marjorie"	Swift; A. Dessner	A. Dessner	4:17
14.	"Closure"	Swift; A. Dessner	A. Dessner; BJ Burton^{[a]}; James McAlister^{[a]}	3:00
15.	"Evermore" (featuring Bon Iver)	Swift; Bowery; Justin Vernon	Swift; A. Dessner	5:04
Total length:				60:38

Deluxe edition
No.	Title	Writer(s)	Producer(s)	Length
16.	"Right Where You Left Me"	Swift; A. Dessner	A. Dessner	4:05
17.	"It's Time to Go"	Swift; A. Dessner	A. Dessner	4:15
Total length:				68:58

=== Notes ===
- ^{^[a]} signifies an additional producer.
- All track titles are stylized in all lowercase.
- The Japanese CD edition additionally includes the "Dancing Witch" and "Lonely Witch" remixes of "Willow".
- The Digitally Signed Fan edition additionally includes the "90s Trend" remix of "Willow.

== Credits and personnel ==
Adapted from the liner notes of Evermore

=== Musicians ===
- Taylor Swift – lead vocals, songwriting, production (2, 3, 6, 15)
- Aaron Dessner – production (1, 2, 4–17), songwriting (1, 4, 7–14, 16, 17), drum machine programming (1, 4–5, 7, 9–17), percussion (1, 10–12), keyboards (1, 5, 7, 11–12, 16–17), synthesizers (1–2, 4, 6–7, 9–12, 14–17), piano (1–2, 4–8, 11, 13–15, 17), electric guitar (1, 4, 6–12, 16–17), bass guitar (1, 4–10, 12, 14, 16–17), acoustic guitar (1–2, 4, 6–13, 16–17), synth bass (2, 10–13, 17), mandolin (6), field recording (6), tambourine (8), high-string guitar (9–10), drum kit (10), rubber bridge guitar (10), drone (13), banjo (16)
- Bryce Dessner – production (9), songwriting (9), orchestration (1, 4–5, 7, 9–17), piano (9, 14), pulse (9), electric guitar (12) (Note: This performer is also credited with recording their instrumentation.)
- James McAlister – synthesizers (1, 5, 10, 12, 14), drum machine programming (1, 5, 10, 12), percussion (5), keyboards (5, 10), Vermona pulse (13), drum kit (14, 16)
- Bryan Devendorf – percussion (1, 10, 13), drum machine programming (1, 5, 9–10, 13, 17), drum kit (9, 12)
- Yuki Numata Resnick – violin (1, 4–5, 7, 9–17)
- Clarice Jensen – cello (1, 4, 5, 9–13, 15, 17)
- Jason Treuting – glockenspiel (1), percussion (5, 9, 13), drum kit (9), crotales (12, 15), metal percussion (12), chord stick (13–14, 17)
- Alex Sopp – flute (1, 15)
- CJ Camerieri – French horn (1)
- Thomas Bartlett – keyboards (1, 4, 7, 8, 16–17), synthesizers (1, 4, 7, 8, 10, 17), piano (8, 16–17)
- William Bowery – songwriting (2, 9, 15), piano (15)
- Logan Coale – upright bass (2, 10–11, 14–15)
- Jack Antonoff – production (3), songwriting (3, 10), drums (3), percussion (3), bass (3), electric guitar (3), acoustic guitar (3), slide guitar (3), piano (3), Mellotron (3), backing vocals (3)
- Mikey Freedom Hart – DX7 (3), electric guitar (3), nylon guitar (3), Rhodes (3), celeste (3)
- Sean Hutchinson – drums (3)
- Michael Riddleberger – drums (3)
- Evan Smith – horns (3)
- Patrik Berger – OP-1 (3)
- Bobby Hawk – violin (3)
- Nick Lloyd – Hammond B3 Organ (4, 16)
- Josh Kaufman – harmonium (4, 16), lap steel (4, 6, 11), electric guitar (6, 8, 16), acoustic guitar (8), organ (6), harmonica (6, 11, 16), mandolin (11)
- Benjamin Lanz – trombone (4, 10), horn arrangement (4), modular synthesizer (8, 10)
- Danielle Haim – vocals (6)
- Este Haim – vocals (6)
- JT Bates – drum kit (6–8, 10, 17), percussion (8, 16–17)
- Ryan Olson – Allovers Hi-Hat Generator (7, 13, 17)
- Matt Berninger – vocals (9)
- Scott Devendorf – bass guitar (9), pocket piano (9)
- Justin Vernon – backing vocals (10, 13), triangle (10), drum kit (10–11, 14), banjo (10), electric guitar (10–11, 17), Prophet X (13), Messina (14), synthesizers (15), field recording (15), vocals (15), bass guitar (17), acoustic guitar (17)
- Kyle Resnick – trumpet (10, 12, 14, 17)
- Marcus Mumford – backing vocals (11)
- Marjorie Finlay – backing vocals (13)
- Trever Hagen – trumpet (14), no-input mixer (14)
- BJ Burton – additional production (14)
- James McAlister – additional production (14)
- Gabriel Cabezas – cello (14–15)
- Dave Nelson – trombone (14, 17)
- Stuart Bogie – alto clarinet (15), contrabass clarinet (15), flute (15)
- Jonathan Low – drum machine programming (16)

Additional instrument recording

- Kyle Resnick – violin (1, 4–5, 7, 9–17)
- Bobby Hawk – violin (3)
- Aaron Dessner – vermona pulse (13)
- Robin Baynton – piano (Bowery on 15)

=== Technical ===
- Taylor Swift – executive producer
- Jonathan Low – recording (1–2, 4–17), vocal recording (1–5; Swift on 6, 9; 10–14; Swift on 15; 17), mixing (all tracks)
- Aaron Dessner – recording (1–2, 4–17)
- Greg Calbi – mastering
- Steve Fallone – mastering
- Laura Sisk – recording (3), vocal recording (8)
- John Rooney – assistant engineering (3)
- Jon Sher – assistant engineering (3)
- Ariel Rechtshaid – vocal recording (Danielle and Este Haim on 6)
- Matt DiMona – vocal recording (Danielle and Este Haim on 6)
- Robin Baynton – vocal recording (7; Swift on 9; Mumford on 11; 16)
- Sean O'Brien – vocal recording (Berninger on 9)
- Justin Vernon – vocal recording (Bon Iver on 15)

=== Design ===
- Beth Garrabrant – photography

== Charts ==
=== Weekly charts ===
Weekly chart performance
Chart (2020–2022)	Peak position
Argentine Albums (CAPIF)	1
Australian Albums (ARIA)	1
Austrian Albums (Ö3 Austria)	2
Belgian Albums (Ultratop Flanders)	1
Belgian Albums (Ultratop Wallonia)	20
Canadian Albums (Billboard)	1
Croatian International Albums (HDU)	1
Czech Albums (ČNS IFPI)	8
Danish Albums (Hitlisten)	2
Dutch Albums (Album Top 100)	3
Finnish Albums (Suomen virallinen lista)	7
French Albums (SNEP)	51
German Albums (Offizielle Top 100)	5
Greek Albums (IFPI)	1
Hungarian Albums (MAHASZ)	20
Icelandic Albums (Plötutíðindi)	18
Irish Albums (Official Charts)	2
Italian Albums (FIMI)	26
Japan Hot Albums (Billboard Japan)	19
Japanese Albums (Oricon)	16
Lithuanian Albums (AGATA)	5
New Zealand Albums (RMNZ)	1
Norwegian Albums (VG-lista)	3
Polish Albums (ZPAV)	46
Portuguese Albums (AFP)	1
Scottish Albums (Official Charts)	3
Slovak Albums (ČNS IFPI)	20
Spanish Albums (PROMUSICAE)	11
Swedish Albums (Sverigetopplistan)	3
Swiss Albums (Schweizer Hitparade)	4
Swiss Albums (Romandie)	5
UK Albums (Official Charts)	1
UK Americana Albums (Official Charts)	1
US Billboard 200	1
US Top Alternative Albums (Billboard)	1
US Top Rock & Alternative Albums (Billboard)	3

=== Year-end charts ===
2020 year-end chart performance
Chart (2020)	Position
Australian Albums (ARIA)	47

2021 year-end chart performance
Chart (2021)	Position
Australian Albums (ARIA)	15
Belgian Albums (Ultratop Flanders)	23
Canadian Albums (Billboard)	9
Danish Albums (Hitlisten)	45
Dutch Albums (Album Top 100)	71
German Albums (Offizielle Top 100)	65
Irish Albums (IRMA)	21
New Zealand Albums (RMNZ)	24
Portuguese Albums (AFP)	62
Spanish Albums (PROMUSICAE)	55
Swiss Albums (Schweizer Hitparade)	56
UK Albums (OCC)	31
US Billboard 200	4
US Top Alternative Albums (Billboard)	1

2022 year-end chart performance
Chart (2022)	Position
Australian Albums (ARIA)	59
Belgian Albums (Ultratop Flanders)	99
UK Albums (OCC)	76
US Billboard 200	68
US Top Alternative Albums (Billboard)	6

2023 year-end chart performance
Chart (2023)	Position
Canadian Albums (Billboard)	46
Dutch Albums (Album Top 100)	96
UK Albums (OCC)	42
US Billboard 200	29
US Top Alternative Albums (Billboard)	2

2024 year-end chart performance
Chart (2024)	Position
Australian Albums (ARIA)	28
Belgian Albums (Ultratop Flanders)	46
Canadian Albums (Billboard)	41
Croatian International Albums (HDU)	20
Dutch Albums (Album Top 100)	98
Portuguese Albums (AFP)	35
UK Albums (OCC)	49
US Billboard 200	41
US Top Alternative Albums (Billboard)	5

2025 year-end chart performance
Chart (2025)	Position
Belgian Albums (Ultratop Flanders)	136
US Billboard 200	155
US Top Alternative Albums (Billboard)	20
US Top Rock & Alternative Albums (Billboard)	36

== Certifications ==
Certifications and sales thresholds
Region	Certification	Certified units/sales
Australia (ARIA)	2× Platinum	140,000^{‡}
Austria (IFPI Austria)	Platinum	15,000^{‡}
Belgium (BRMA)	Gold	10,000^{‡}
Brazil (Pro-Música Brasil)	3× Platinum	120,000^{‡}
Canada (Music Canada)	4× Platinum	320,000^{‡}
Denmark (IFPI Danmark)	2× Platinum	40,000^{‡}
France (SNEP)	Gold	50,000^{‡}
Germany (BVMI)	Gold	100,000^{‡}
Italy (FIMI)	Gold	25,000^{‡}
New Zealand (RMNZ)	3× Platinum	45,000^{‡}
Norway (IFPI Norway)	Gold	10,000^{‡}
Poland (ZPAV)	Platinum	20,000^{‡}
Portugal (AFP)	Gold	3,500^{‡}
Spain (Promusicae)	Gold	20,000^{‡}
United Kingdom (BPI)	2× Platinum	600,000^{‡}
United States (RIAA)	4× Platinum	4,000,000^{‡}
^{‡} Sales+streaming figures based on certification alone.

== Release history ==
Release dates and formats
Initial release date	Edition(s)	Format(s)	Ref.
December 11, 2020	Standard	Digital download; streaming	
December 18, 2020	Deluxe	CD	
January 7, 2021	Deluxe	Digital download; streaming	
February 12, 2021	Deluxe	Cassette	
May 28, 2021	Deluxe	Vinyl LP	
June 3, 2021	Digitally signed	Digital download	

== See also ==
- List of Billboard 200 number-one albums of 2020
- List of Billboard 200 number-one albums of 2021
- List of UK Albums Chart number ones of the 2020s
- List of UK Album Downloads Chart number ones of the 2020s
- List of number-one albums of 2020 (Australia)
- List of number-one albums of 2021 (Australia)
- List of number-one albums of 2021 (Belgium)
- List of number-one albums of 2020 (Canada)
- List of number-one albums of 2021 (Canada)
- List of number-one albums from the 2020s (New Zealand)
