= Right Where You Left Me =

2020 song by Taylor Swift

Song by Taylor Swift

from the album Evermore (Deluxe)
- Written: c. December 2020
- Released: December 11, 2020
- Studio: Long Pond (New York)
- Genre: Indie folk; folk-pop; gothic country
- Length: 4:05
- Label: Republic
- Songwriters: Taylor Swift; Aaron Dessner
- Producer: Aaron Dessner

Lyric video
- "Right Where You Left Me" on YouTube

"Right Where You Left Me" is a song by the American singer-songwriter Taylor Swift from her ninth studio album, Evermore (2020). First issued as part of the album's physical deluxe edition on December 11, 2020, it was released for streaming and download on January 7, 2021. The track was initially written by Aaron Dessner for his band Big Red Machine; during the COVID-19 lockdowns in 2020, it was completed by Swift and Dessner for Evermore several days before the album was finished.

"Right Where You Left Me" is an indie folk, folk-pop, and gothic country ballad. It is driven by a banjo hook and incorporates distorted guitars towards the end. Lyrically, the song is about the feeling of being trapped in time and unable to move on from a heartbreak, describing Swift's narrator as a woman stuck "at the restaurant" since the moment her ex-boyfriend broke up with her. Several critics have considered "Right Where You Left Me" a highlight in Swift's discography, emphasizing its lyrical metaphor and replay value.

== Background and release ==
Amidst the COVID-19 lockdowns, Taylor Swift worked on her eighth studio album, Folklore, with Aaron Dessner and Jack Antonoff. Surprise-released on July 24, 2020, Folklore incorporated new styles for Swift such as indie folk and indie rock, and it garnered widespread critical acclaim. In September 2020, the three assembled at Long Pond Studio in upstate New York to film Folklore: The Long Pond Studio Sessions, a documentary consisting of stripped-down renditions of tracks from Folklore and recounting the creative process behind the album. After filming, the three celebrated Folklore by drinking and unexpectedly continued writing songs while staying at Long Pond. The result was a studio album, Evermore, which Swift described as a "sister record" to Folklore.

Swift wrote much of Evermore with Dessner and recorded the album at his Long Pond. One track that they wrote together was "Right Where You Left Me", which was produced by Dessner. Initially a composition by Dessner for his band Big Red Machine earlier, the track was completed by Swift as one of the last two songs (the other being "Happiness") for Evermore, days before the album was finished. According to Dessner, Swift recorded her vocals remotely due to pandemic restrictions. The track was recorded and mixed at Long Pond, and Swift's vocals were recorded at Scarlet Pimpernel Studio in Devon, England.

"Right Where You Left Me" is included as a bonus track to the deluxe edition of Evermore, which was released on CD and vinyl on December 11, 2020, via Republic Records. On January 7, 2021, the track was released for streaming and download. In the US, "Right Where You Left Me" peaked at number 12 on the Bubbling Under Hot 100 chart and number 10 on the Hot Rock & Alternative Songs chart. The track was certified platinum in Australia, gold in Brazil and New Zealand, and silver in the UK. Swift performed the song live as a "surprise song" on acoustic guitar twice on the Eras Tour: at the Santa Clara show with Dessner on July 28, 2023; and at the Zurich show as part of a mashup with her 2014 song "All You Had to Do Was Stay" on July 9, 2024.

== Music and lyrics ==
At four minutes and five seconds long, "Right Where You Left Me" is a ballad that combines indie folk, folk-pop, and gothic country. Driven by a banjo part played by Dessner, which constitutes the hook, its instrumentation incorporates harmonica, harmonium, and twangy guitars that distort towards the conclusion. Critics described Swift's singing as melancholic, resembling the manners of talking or recounting a story with shock, over layered banjo and "guitar chugs". In Billboard, Jason Lipshutz wrote that the track drove the album "toward a feeling of stasis". Variety's Chris Willman wrote that Swift's "talky verses" evoke the cadences of someone ruminating with her own thoughts over an extended period of time, and that the production has a "slow build toward a big chill". Nora Princiotti of The Ringer commented that Swift's vocals display "a touch of comedy" and also "real desperation".

Lyrically, the song depicts a female narrator's entrapment in heartbreak. She is still hurt over the moment that her ex-boyfriend left her in a restaurant years ago, comparing her own existence to that of a ghost, frozen in time, sitting at a corner in the same restaurant. From where she sits, she wonders if the ex-boyfriend has a family by now and observes how things and people have changed over time ("Friends break up, friends get married/ Strangers get born and strangers get buried"). The sense of loss is so profound that she cannot function, comparing herself to "glass shattered on the white cloth", sitting at the same place under dim lights, until dust collects on her pinned-up hair. Nate Jones of Vulture compared the narrator of "Right Where You Left Me" to Miss Havisham.

In the bridge, Swift's narrator details the public mockery over her situation: "She's still 23 inside her fantasy/ How it was supposed to be/ Did you hear about the girl who lives in delusion?/ Breakups happen every day you don't have to lose it." In the journal First Things, the cultural critic Patricia Snow argued that these lyrics represent a tension between the contemporary female sexual liberation and the persistent negative view on the female experience of heartbreak.

== Reception ==
Several critics have considered "Right Where You Left Me" a standout from Swift's discography, questioning Swift's decision to leave it out of the track listing for the standard edition of Evermore. Billboard ranked it the best song out of all Swift's bonus or deluxe-edition tracks; Lipshutz wrote that despite its status as a bonus track, it stood among some of Swift's best-written songs. Willman placed it third on his ranking of Swift's catalog, behind "All Too Well (10 Minute Version)" and "You Belong with Me". Describing it as one of Swift's "most dramatic songs", Willman compared its theme of being unable to move on from a breakup to "All Too Well", although he contended that "Right Where You Left Me" contains metaphor that situates it in a "slightly more intellectualized territory".

Rob Sheffield of Rolling Stone ranked the track 13th out of his ranking of Swift's 286 songs, writing that the song has a replay value that might lead a listener to "[put] it on repeat and [shut] down the flow of the album". Clash selected it as one of Swift's 15 best songs in a 2022 unranked list. Its writer, Sahar Ghadirian, praised the "sonic progression" as being "catchy and ominous" and able to engage the listeners with the emotional upheaval of the character. Jones was not as enthusiastic, saying that the lyrical metaphor "is overwhelmed by the song's Gothic elements".

The track contributed to a viral TikTok trend where users post videos about how they managed to "leave the restaurant", alluding to the lyric "Help, I'm still at the restaurant", which is about being trapped in time and haunted by the past.

== Credits and personnel ==
Credits are adapted from the liner notes of Evermore.

=== Studios ===
- Recorded and mixed at Long Pond Studio (New York)
- Nick Lloyd's performance recorded by himself at Firehouse 12 (New Haven, Connecticut)
- Aaron Dessner's and Josh Kaufman's performances recorded at Long Pond Studio (New York)
- JT Bates's performance recorded by himself at Salon Studio (Saint Paul, Minnesota)
- Thomas Bartlett's performance recorded by himself at The Dweling (New York)
- Taylor Swift's lead vocals recorded at Scarlet Pimpernel (Devon, England)

=== Personnel ===
- Taylor Swift – writing, lead vocals, producer
- Aaron Dessner – producer, recording, drum machine programming, acoustic guitar, banjo, synth, electric guitar, keyboard
- Thomas Bartlett – keyboard, piano
- JT Bates – percussion
- Robin Baynton – lead vocals recording
- Bryce Dessner – orchestrator
- Josh Kaufman – electric guitar, harmonica, harmonium
- Nick Lloyd – Hammond organ
- James McAlister – drums, drums recording
- Jonathan Low – drum machine programming, recording, mixing
- Kyle Resnick – violin recording
- Yuki Numata Resnick – violin

== Charts ==
Chart performance for "Right Where You Left Me"
Chart (2021)	Peak position
New Zealand Hot Singles (RMNZ)	15
UK Singles Downloads (Official Charts)	22
UK Singles Sales (Official Charts)	24
US Bubbling Under Hot 100 (Billboard)	12
US Hot Rock & Alternative Songs (Billboard)	10

== Certifications ==
Certifications for "Right Where You Left Me"
Region	Certification	Certified units/sales
Australia (ARIA)	Platinum	70,000^{‡}
Brazil (Pro-Música Brasil)	Gold	20,000^{‡}
New Zealand (RMNZ)	Gold	15,000^{‡}
United Kingdom (BPI)	Silver	200,000^{‡}
^{‡} Sales+streaming figures based on certification alone.
