= Tolerate It =

2020 song by Taylor Swift

Song by Taylor Swift

from the album Evermore
- Released: December 11, 2020
- Studio: Long Pond (Hudson Valley)
- Length: 4:05
- Label: Republic
- Songwriters: Taylor Swift; Aaron Dessner
- Producer: Aaron Dessner

Lyric video
- "Tolerate It" on YouTube

"Tolerate It" is a song by the American singer-songwriter Taylor Swift, taken from her ninth studio album, Evermore (2020). She wrote the track with its producer, Aaron Dessner. A slow building piano ballad, "Tolerate It" features a midtempo production and an odd time signature. Inspired by the Daphne du Maurier novel Rebecca (1938), its lyrics are narrated by a young woman who addresses her unstable relationship with an older man who does not seem to like her.

Critics praised "Tolerate It" for its vulnerable songwriting from Swift and an engaging production, with many selecting it as a highlight from Evermore. Commercially, the song peaked at number 28 on the Billboard Global 200 and entered the charts of Australia, Canada, Portugal, the United States. It received certifications from Australia, Brazil, and the UK. It was included on the regular set list of the Eras Tour (2023–2024).

== Production ==
On July 24, 2020, the American singer-songwriter Taylor Swift released her eighth studio album, Folklore, to critical and commercial success. On November 25, Swift and the album's co-writers and co-producers, including the first-time collaborator Aaron Dessner, assembled at Long Pond Studio in Hudson Valley to film a concert documentary titled Folklore: The Long Pond Studio Sessions, which was released on Disney+. They continued writing songs at Long Pond, with Swift penning lyrics to Dessner's instrumental tracks, a process that was present on much of the songs they had worked on Folklore. Their sessions resulted in a project that was a natural extension of the album, which became Evermore (2020).

One of the songs both Swift and Dessner wrote was "Tolerate It". Dessner produced the track prior to writing it with Swift. Before sending the instrumental to her, he thought that "she won't be into it" because of its "odd" elements. However, after Dessner sent the instrumental to Swift, she sent it back with finished lyrics. He recalled in a Rolling Stone interview that he cried upon hearing "Tolerate It" for the first time and described it as a "crushingly beautiful song". It was recorded by Dessner and Jonathan Low at Long Pond, where Low also recorded the vocals. The track was mixed by Low at Long Pond and mastered by Greg Calbi and Steve Fallone at Sterling Sound in Edgewater, New Jersey.

== Music and lyrics ==
"Tolerate It"
A sample of "Tolerate It", demonstrating the repetitive piano chords, synth beats, and time signature

"Tolerate It" is a slow building piano ballad that runs for four minutes and five seconds. It features an odd time signature; Dessner said the song was set in a 10/8 signature, while Jon Pareles of The New York Times and Nate Jones of Vulture thought it was in a 5/4 signature. The midtempo production contains bass guitar, cello, percussion, violin, and skittering synth beats with recurring keyboard chord patterns. Critics described the piano as "solemn, chilly", "muffled", and "frosty". Ray Finlayson of Beats Per Minute opined that the song could have fit on Folklore because he thought it had similar musical elements.

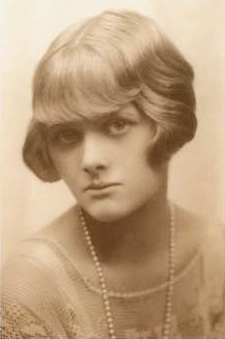
"Tolerate It" was inspired by the novel Rebecca by Daphne du Maurier (pictured).

"Tolerate It" details the difficulties of loving someone who undervalues their relationship; Swift wrote that the track is about "ambivalent toleration" and that it was inspired by the Daphne du Maurier novel Rebecca (1938). In the lyrics, it describes an unstable relationship between two characters with a wide age gap, narrated from the young woman's perspective. She delivers "acts of service" to her partner, such as setting the table with "the fancy shit". The woman admits that she has worth and professes about it ("I know my love should be celebrated"), yet is faced with indifference ("but you tolerate it"). Swift employs her upper register as the woman realizes that she has the power to leave the relationship: "You assume I'm fine, but what would you do if I / Break free and leave us in ruins [...] / Gain the weight of you then lose it / Believe me, I could do it".

Some critics drew similarities to other songs and a few highlighted lyrics from the track. In The Guardian, the music journalist Alexis Petridis thought that Swift inhabited the character of a "disenchanted wife" on "Tolerate It" and believed it evoked the one on the Smiths' song "Asleep" (1985). Rolling Stone's writer Rob Sheffield found the track to be more in line to a 1970s Carole King song. Emily Algar from Atwood Magazine interpreted the lyric, "I made you my temple, my mural, my sky/ Now I'm begging for footnotes in the story of your life", to be the feeling of loving someone who loves you less. For Katherine Rodgers of The Quietus, she thought the lyric, "You're so much older, and wiser, and I", revealed the age difference of the relationship.

== Release and live performance ==
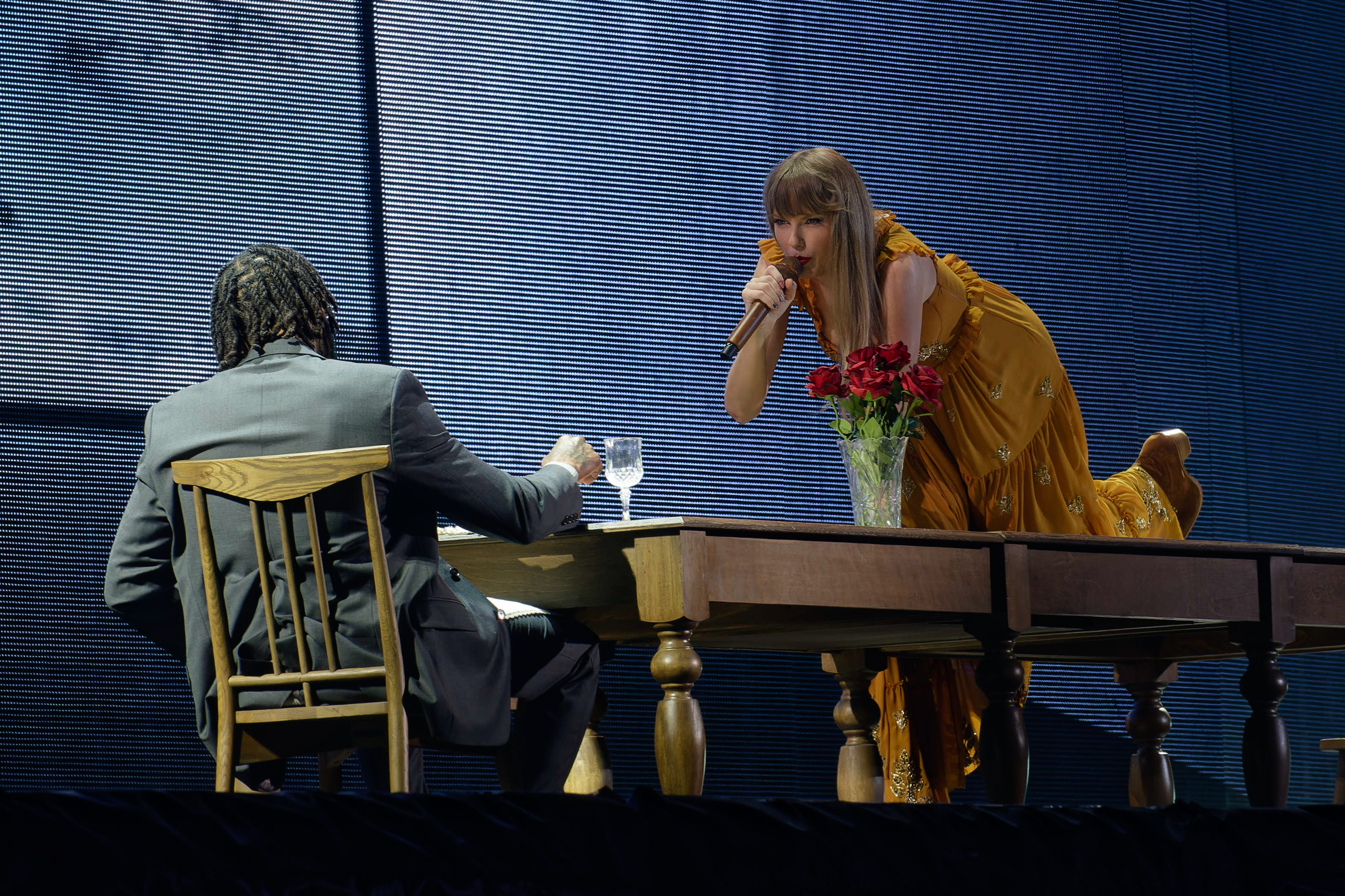
Swift performing "Tolerate It" on the Eras Tour

"Tolerate It" was released as the fifth track on Evermore on December 11, 2020, by Republic Records. The song reached number 28 on the Billboard Global 200 and charted in the countries of Canada (18) and Portugal (101). In the United States, it debuted and peaked at number 45 on the Billboard Hot 100 and increased Swift's total entries to 128. Meanwhile, the track opened at number eight on Hot Rock & Alternative Songs, where it lasted for 14 weeks and appeared on the chart's 2021 year-end at number 47. In Australia, "Tolerate It" peaked at number 28 on the ARIA Singles Chart and received a platinum certification from the Australian Recording Industry Association (ARIA). In the United Kingdom, the song reached number 59 on the Official Charts Audio Streaming Chart and was certified silver by the British Phonographic Industry (BPI). In Brazil, it received a gold certification from Pro-Música Brasil.

In March 2023, Swift embarked on her sixth concert tour, the Eras Tour, as a tribute to her discography. The show consists of ten acts, including the Evermore set, where it features "Tolerate It". Swift would arrange a long dinner table for two people before performing the track; Ilana Kaplan of i reported that "she crawled and danced" across the table. Chris Willman from Variety believed that the set was inspired by the 1941 film Citizen Kane and that it was done to highlight the track's "domestic drama". Kelsey Barnes of The Independent called the set "sparse and cold" and thought it reflects the song's "stark" sound. For Rolling Stone, Waiss Aramesh found the setting "beautiful" and wrote that Swift delivered a "heart-wrenching rendition" of the track. In May 2024, "Tolerate It" was removed from the tour's set list.

== Critical reception ==
Publication reviews for Evermore considered "Tolerate It" an album highlight. (Note: Attributed to The Atlantic, Atwood Magazine, Beats Per Minute, Esquire, and the Los Angeles Times) They lauded the vulnerability displayed in Swift's songwriting, (Note: Attributed to The Atlantic, The A.V. Club, Clash, Esquire, the Los Angeles Times, No Ripcord, PopMatters, and Vulture) with a number of them claiming that it contained some of her best writing. (Note: Attributed to The Atlantic and Exclaim!) Konstantinos Pappis of Our Culture Mag viewed "Tolerate It" as one of Evermore's "most affecting moments" and thought it felt "strikingly personal" despite being devoid of Swift's autobiographical songwriting. Patrick Ryan from USA Today regarded the song as a lyrical standout from the album. Maura Johnston of Entertainment Weekly thought it was a "masterful portrayal" of a crumbling marriage. Mary Siroky from Consequence wrote that it is where her "narrative storytelling is on full display". Claire Shaffer from Rolling Stone said that "Tolerate It" featured one of "Swift's most damning relationship vignettes to date". Petridis, The Observer's Kitty Empire, and The Quietus' Katherine Rodgers praised the character studies shown, and Petridis added that the song's bitter lyrics were more edifying than those she wrote for her 2017 album Reputation.

Some commended the production. Pareles viewed "Tolerate It" as one of Evermore's "countless musicianly flourishes" and Johnston picked it as one of the album's songs she thought their musical risks succeeded. Helen Brown from The Independent called the track "excellent" and appreciated the "pretty" piano. Saloni Gajjar of The A.V. Club wrote that her "partnership with Dessner resulted in some beautiful renditions" on Evermore and picked "Tolerate It" as an example. Jason Lipshutz of Billboard regarded it as one of the album's tracks that serves the production as the emotional hook. Nora Princiotti of The Ringer thought the "odd" time signature brought "really cool effects". Ellen Johnson from Paste said the song was "full of Swift's hard-won wisdom" and viewed it as one of the tracks to represent Evermore as a peaceful, intimate album.

On less positive reviews, the Slate writer Carl Wilson found "Tolerate It" to have one of the "draggiest [Dessner] compositions" on the album and thought it resulted in "numbing and disappointing music". Cory McConnell of The Ringer deemed the song melodrama and "a bit of a drag" on Evermore, and Sputnikmusic criticized Swift for using the same hook that was shared with the album's several tracks. "Tolerate It" was featured in the rankings of Swift's discography by Rolling Stone (94) and Vulture (138).

== Personnel ==
Credits are adapted from the liner notes of Evermore.

- Taylor Swift – vocals, songwriting
- Aaron Dessner – songwriting, production, piano, drum machine programming, bass guitar, keyboards, recording
- Bryan Devendorf – drum machine programming
- Bryce Dessner – orchestration
- Clarice Jensen – cello
- James McAlister percussion, drum machine programming, keyboards, synthesizer
- Jason Treuting – percussion
- Yuki Numata Resnick – violin
- Jonathan Low – mixing, recording
- Greg Calbi – mastering
- Steve Fallone – mastering

== Charts ==
=== Weekly charts ===
Weekly chart performance for "Tolerate It"
| Chart (2020–2021) | Peak position |
|---|---|
| Australia (ARIA) | 33 |
| Canada Hot 100 (Billboard) | 18 |
| Global 200 (Billboard) | 28 |
| Portugal (AFP) | 101 |
| UK Audio Streaming (Official Charts) | 59 |
| US Billboard Hot 100 | 45 |
| US Hot Rock & Alternative Songs (Billboard) | 8 |

=== Year-end chart ===
Year-end chart performance for "Tolerate It"
| Chart (2021) | Position |
|---|---|
| US Hot Rock & Alternative Songs (Billboard) | 47 |

== Certifications ==
Certifications for "Tolerate It"
| Region | Certification | Certified units/sales |
|---|---|---|
| Australia (ARIA) | Platinum | 70,000^{‡} |
| Brazil (Pro-Música Brasil) | Gold | 20,000^{‡} |
| New Zealand (RMNZ) | Gold | 15,000^{‡} |
| United Kingdom (BPI) | Silver | 200,000^{‡} |
^{‡} Sales+streaming figures based on certification alone.
