= Cowboy like Me =

2020 song by Taylor Swift

Song by Taylor Swift

from the album Evermore
- Released: December 11, 2020
- Recorded: 2020
- Studio: Scarlet Pimpernel (Devon)
- Genre: Americana; country
- Length: 4:35
- Label: Republic
- Songwriters: Taylor Swift; Aaron Dessner
- Producer: Aaron Dessner

Lyric video
- "Cowboy like Me" on YouTube

"Cowboy like Me" is a song by the American singer-songwriter Taylor Swift from her ninth studio album, Evermore (2020). She wrote the track with its producer, Aaron Dessner. A slow ballad that has a mellow instrumentation, "Cowboy like Me" is a country and Americana song featuring elements of country rock and blues. Swift sings with a country twang on the track, which includes backing harmony vocals from Marcus Mumford. The lyrics tell the story of how two con artists unexpectedly fall in love while scamming wealthy people in their town.

Music critics generally praised the lyrical narrative of "Cowboy like Me", although several thought that its sound was not captivating; several critics have considered it one of Evermore's standouts and a fan favorite. Upon the release of Evermore, the track peaked at number 62 on the Billboard Global 200 and charted in Australia, Canada, and the US. Swift occasionally performed "Cowboy like Me" live on the Eras Tour in 2023 and 2024, while Mumford regularly sang it live on a tour that supported his debut studio album, Self-Titled (2022).

== Background and production ==
Amidst the COVID-19 lockdowns, Taylor Swift worked on her eighth studio album, Folklore, with Aaron Dessner and Jack Antonoff. Surprise-released on July 24, 2020, Folklore incorporated new styles for Swift such as indie folk and indie rock, and it garnered widespread critical acclaim. In September 2020, Swift, Antonoff, and Dessner assembled at Long Pond Studio in upstate New York to film Folklore: The Long Pond Studio Sessions, a documentary consisting of stripped-down renditions of tracks from Folklore and recounting the creative process behind the album.

After filming, the three celebrated Folklore by drinking and unexpectedly continued writing songs while staying at Long Pond. The result was a studio album, Evermore, which Swift described as a "sister record" to Folklore. Swift wrote much of Evermore with Dessner and recorded the album at Dessner's Long Pond. One track that they wrote together was "Cowboy like Me", which was produced by Dessner and recorded at Scarlet Pimpernel Studios at Marcus Mumford's home in Devon, England. On the track, Josh Kaufman plays lap steel guitar, harmonica, and mandolin, Justin Vernon plays drums and electric guitar, and Marcus Mumford of the English band Mumford & Sons sings background vocals.

== Music and lyrics ==
"Cowboy like Me"
A sample of "Cowboy like Me", where it showcases Swift's vocals and Mumford's harmonies layering on top of one another in the third refrain, as well as one of the song's guitar solos after that part.

Running for 4 minutes and 35 seconds, "Cowboy like Me" is a ballad that has a slow pace (Note: Ilana Kaplan of i-D and Ellen Pierson-Hagger of the New Statesman regarded the song as slow-paced, while Consequence's Mary Siroky argued that it was "midtempo".) and a mellow instrumentation. The song incorporates a languid piano groove, guitar solos, sparse harmonica riffs, and easy-brushed drums. It also includes a guitar riff that the New Statesman's Ellen Pierson-Hagger thought recalls the melody that begins Swift's debut single, "Tim McGraw" (2006). Swift has a country twang in her vocal performance, where Sarah Carson from The i Paper said that she sings sequences of notes that are identical to "Tim McGraw". Mumford provides harmony vocals that critics described as "shadowy", "sultry", and "whispery".

"Cowboy like Me" is an Americana track that features elements of country rock and blues. Dessner considered it a country song, while several reviews deemed it country-styled and one of the two Evermore tracks (alongside "No Body, No Crime") that returned to Swift's country and Americana origins. In Pitchfork, Sam Sodomsky said that the two tracks were the ones that most resembled country music among her works in years. Jason Lipshutz of Billboard stated that the song was a combination of country, folk, and "sun-kissed" alternative, while the Los Angeles Times' Mikael Wood wrote that it contained a folk rock arrangement, and Variety's Chris Willman deemed the sound reminiscent of the "laid-back early '70s style". For NME, Hannah Mylrea said that the track would seamlessly fit on Lana Del Rey's album, Norman Fucking Rockwell! (2019). The song's soundscape was also likened to the music of T Bone Burnett and the Civil Wars.

According to Swift, "Cowboy like Me" is a song about "two young con artists who fall in love while hanging out at fancy resorts trying to score rich romantic beneficiaries". Its lyrics have a melancholic and picaresque tone; they depict two high-society scammers who are used to tricking rich people by feigning love, and when they intend to use their tricks on each other, they realize that their scheming has turned into real feelings. Swift's narrator expresses her feelings for her male counterpart, waiting by the phone and hoping he would call. She eventually gets heartbroken, referencing the Gardens of Babylon as a metaphor for how the affair has impacted her. Carl Wilson of Slate opined that the narrative was reminiscent of the 1931 rom-com Blonde Crazy.

== Release and commercial performance ==
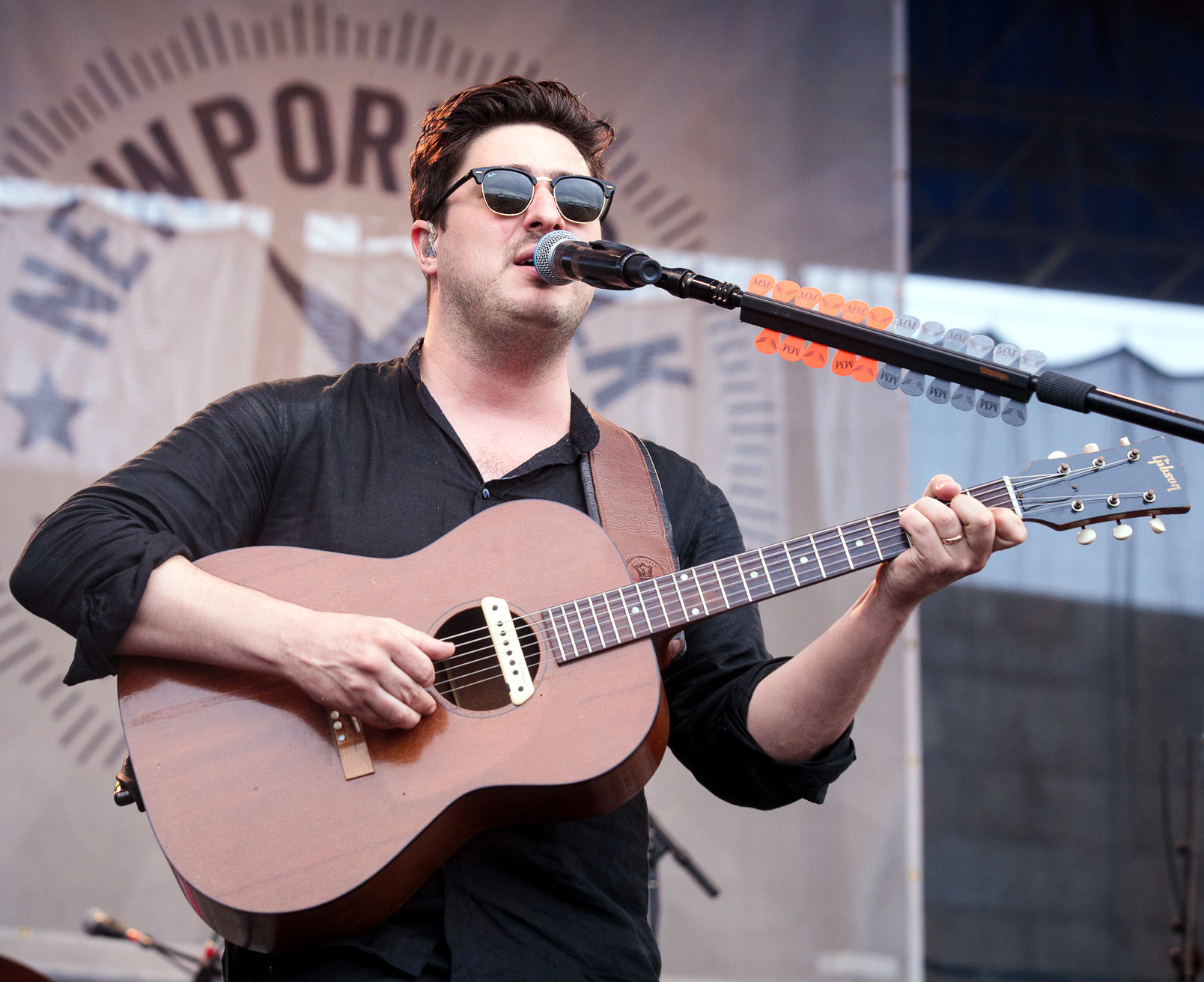
Marcus Mumford sings background vocals on "Cowboy like Me" and performed the song live solo during his 2022 and 2023 tour.

Less than five months after Folklore's release, Evermore was announced on December 10, 2020, and was released the next day via Republic Records. "Cowboy like Me" is number 10 on the track listing. Upon the release of Evermore, "Cowboy like Me" debuted and peaked at number 62 on the Billboard Global 200 chart, number 55 on the ARIA Singles Chart in Australia, number 71 on the US Billboard Hot 100 chart, and number 43 on the Canadian Hot 100. The song has been certified gold in Australia, Brazil, and New Zealand, and silver in the UK.

Mumford performed his solo rendition of "Cowboy live Me" during his 2022 and 2023 live concerts as part of a tour to promote his debut studio album, Self-Titled (2022). It was the penultimate number to the set list, as part of the encore. On July 15, 2023, Mumford and Maggie Rogers covered "Cowboy like Me" at the inaugural Sommo Festival in Cavendish, Prince Edward Island.

Swift performed "Cowboy like Me" four times on the Eras Tour. She and Mumford performed "Cowboy like Me" together live for the first time at a concert in Las Vegas on March 25, 2023. In 2024, she performed the song as part of mashups with other tracks from her discography: with "Tim McGraw" on acoustic guitar on March 9 in Singapore, with "You Are in Love" on piano on July 5 in Amsterdam, and with "Maroon" on piano on November 2 in Indianapolis.

== Critical reception ==
"Cowboy like Me" received generally positive reviews for its narrative storytelling, while opinions on the production were mixed. Mikael Wood of the Los Angeles Times and Nate Jones of Vulture complimented the lyricism but were not impressed by the production; the former wrote that its arrangement "never gets up and goes anywhere" while the latter described the sound as "anonymous" but highlighted the "lived-in cynicism" of the lyrics. Wilson said that the "lyrical conceit here is great" but contended that the music could be better if it actually sounded "like what these self-declared 'cowboys' and 'villains' might sing", and he deemed Mumford's vocals "snoozy". Lipshutz ranked the song 9th among the 17 tracks from Evermore's deluxe edition, writing that it was an "ambitious mix" of genres and one of the album's "most decadent listens". Sodomsky labeled the track "gorgeous", while Chris Willman of Variety praised Mumford's "lovely harmony vocal". Bobby Olivier of Spin regarded "Cowboy like Me" as one of the surprises that emerged upon close listens of the album.

Other reviews praised the lyrics. Alan Light of Esquire described the song as a "finely-etched grifter's tale", while Neil McCormick of The Daily Telegraph highlighted the "playfully noirish twists", and Deborah Krieger of PopMatters selected it as one of the album's strong tracks with "immersive realism". The Atlantic's Spencer Kornharber lauded the track for "[showing] how Swift's love for conspiratorial romances draws out her knack for detail and scenery". American Songwriter's Alex Hopper regarded "Cowboy like Me" as a fan favorite off Evermore and one of its "highpoints". Willman ranked the track among the best 75 songs by Swift, deeming it one of "the more obviously fictional narratives" in her discography.

== Credits and personnel ==
Credits adapted from the liner notes of Evermore

- Taylor Swift − vocals, songwriting
- Aaron Dessner − songwriting, production, recording, drum machine, percussion, synth bass, piano, keyboards, synthesizer, acoustic guitar, electric guitar
- Marcus Mumford − backing vocals
- Josh Kaufman − lap steel, harmonica, mandolin
- Justin Vernon − drum kit, electric guitar
- Bryce Dessner − orchestration
- Yuki Numata Resnick − orchestration
- Clarice Jensen − orchestration
- Robin Baynton − recording
- Kyle Resnick − recording
- Greg Calbi − mastering
- Steve Fallone − mastering
- Logan Coale − upright bass

== Charts ==
Chart performance for "Cowboy like Me"
Chart (2020)	Peak position
Australia (ARIA)	55
Canada Hot 100 (Billboard)	43
Global 200 (Billboard)	62
UK Audio Streaming (OCC)	91
US Billboard Hot 100	71
US Hot Rock & Alternative Songs (Billboard)	15
US Rolling Stone Top 100	50

=== Year-end chart ===
Year-end chart performance for "Cowboy like Me"
Chart (2021)	Position
US Hot Rock & Alternative Songs (Billboard)	83

== Certifications ==
Certifications for "Cowboy like Me"
Region	Certification	Certified units/sales
Australia (ARIA)	Gold	35,000^{‡}
Brazil (Pro-Música Brasil)	Gold	20,000^{‡}
New Zealand (RMNZ)	Gold	15,000^{‡}
United Kingdom (BPI)	Silver	200,000^{‡}
^{‡} Sales+streaming figures based on certification alone.
