= Long Story Short (Taylor Swift song) =

2020 song by Taylor Swift

Song by Taylor Swift

from the album Evermore
- Released: December 11, 2020
- Recorded: 2020
- Studio: Long Pond (Hudson Valley)
- Genre: Synth-pop; electropop; folk-pop; indie rock
- Length: 3:35
- Label: Republic
- Songwriters: Taylor Swift; Aaron Dessner
- Producer: Aaron Dessner

Lyric video
- "Long Story Short" on YouTube

"Long Story Short" is a song by the American singer-songwriter Taylor Swift from her ninth studio album, Evermore (2020). She wrote the song with its producer, Aaron Dessner. "Long Story Short" is an upbeat song that consists of dynamic programmed and live drums, synths, strings, and guitars; music critics characterize the genre as synth-pop, electropop, folk-pop, and indie rock. The lyrics see Swift reminiscing about a dark part of her past and her contentment with a current state of mind.

Music critics found the upbeat arrangement and dynamic instrumentation of "Long Story Short" refreshing for Evermore's generally soft and relaxed pace. They praised Swift's songwriting and lyrics. The song charted in Australia, Canada, Portugal, and the United States, and it peaked at number 55 on the Billboard Global 200. Swift performed the track three times as part of mashups with some of her other songs on the Eras Tour in 2024.

== Background and release ==
Amidst the COVID-19 lockdowns, Taylor Swift wrote songs and produced her eighth studio album, Folklore, with Aaron Dessner and Jack Antonoff. Surprise-released on July 24, 2020. Folklore incorporated new styles for Swift such as indie folk and indie rock, and it garnered widespread critical acclaim. In September 2020, Swift, Antonoff, and Dessner assembled at Long Pond Studio in upstate New York to film Folklore: The Long Pond Studio Sessions, a documentary consisting of stripped-down renditions of tracks from Folklore and recounting the creative process behind the album. After filming, the three celebrated Folklore by drinking and unexpectedly continued writing songs while staying at Long Pond. The result was a studio album, Evermore, which Swift described as a "sister record" to Folklore.

Evermore was surprise-released on December 11, 2020, five months after Folklore; "Long Story Short" is number 12 on the track listing. The song charted at number 55 on the Billboard Global 200. In the United States, it reached number 68 on the Billboard Hot 100, number 42 on the Rolling Stone Top 100, and number 14 on the Hot Rock & Alternative Songs chart by Billboard. The song further peaked at number 39 on the Canadian Hot 100 and number 49 on Australia's ARIA Singles Chart. In 2024, Swift performed "Long Story Short" three times as part of mashups with her other songs on the Eras Tour; the first one was with "The Story of Us" (2011) at the Singapore stop on March 3, the second was with "The Prophecy" (2024) at the Lyon stop on June 2, and the third was with "You're on Your Own, Kid" (2022) at the Toronto stop on November 16.

== Composition and lyrics ==
"Long Story Short"
A sample of the song's hook, displaying the fast-paced drums and energetic guitars characteristic of the composition in the chorus.

Swift wrote "Long Story Short" with Dessner, who produced it and recorded the track with Jonathan Low at Long Pond Studios in the Hudson Valley. Low also recorded Swift's vocals and mixed the song. Dessner played keyboards, bass, percussion, acoustic and electric guitars, and programmed drums using a drum machine. James McAlister also programmed the drums and synthesizers, and Bryan Devendorf played live drums. Dessner's brother Bryce played additional electric guitars and was the orchestrator for the violin (played by Yuki Numata Resnick), trumpet (Kyle Resnick), and cello (Clarice Jensen).

"Long Story Short" has a propelling tempo driven by both programmed drum machines and live drums that create crisp beats. Its instrumentation consists of dynamic guitars and strings. Critics categorize the song's genre into synth-pop, electropop, folk-pop, and indie rock. The music critics Annie Zaleski and Alan Light thought that the drum beats created a "glitchy" rhythm. Lyrically, "Long Story Short" sees Swift looking back at a dark past; several critics identified references to the controversies that she faced in 2016 and 2017, leading up to the release of her album Reputation (2017). The song starts with Swift reflecting on her low self-esteem that led to wrong romantic decisions and her getting embroiled in "petty things" and "nemeses". In the post-chorus, Swift states that her past relationships reshaped who she is, and in the bridge, she asserts her lack of interest in celebrity drama, focusing only on her relationship outside of work. Towards the end, Swift expresses contentment with her current situation and healthy relationship. The song ends with the lyric, "I survived."

== Critical reception ==
"Long Story Short" received acclaim for its lyrical themes and energetic sound. In reviews of Evermore, critics generally complimented it for its introspective lyrics that showcased Swift's emotional evolution. Slate's Carl Wilson described it as a "fairly slight song but an earned valedictory address" with complementary wordplay and the "pleasure" that "comes in hearing her look back at all that and shrugging". In Rolling Stone, Rob Sheffield wrote: "I love how if she could go back in time, she'd tell her younger self all the things she actually did say a decade ago." Nate Jones of Vulture described the track's sentiments as genuine, compared to the vindictive nature of Reputation. Variety's Chris Willman said that there are the themes of backlash depicted in Reputation and Lover (2019), and Maura Johnston of Entertainment Weekly showcased how Swift's songwriting "leveled up". Steffanee Wang of Nylon complimented how the song showed Swift prioritizing "more important things" over tabloid controversies, and Craig Jenkins of Vulture thought that the song was a "succinctly" retold "personal mythology" of Swift—"the beloved starlet on the mend from a bad hit to her fame and self-esteem". The Quietus's Katherine Rodgers wrote that there are retreads of Swift's "familiar" lyrical themes—"the trials of celebrity, romantic misadventure, falls from grace, all illustrated in quick-fire metaphor".

Other critics found the song's dynamic production refreshing for a generally slow-paced album. Jason Lipshutz of Billboard deemed "Long Story Short" the best track of Evermore, saying that it has the ability to create "deceptively simple" music that "is bursting with layers and moving pieces". Holly Gleason of Hits branded the song "percolating" and the "closest thing to an actual single" on Evermore, and Rodgers highlighted the "playful, infectious" chorus. Two reviewers of Business Insider concluded that "Long Story Short" is "the closest Swift gets to revisiting her pop star persona" and described it as an amalgam of Swift's past albums: the musical textures of 1989 (2014) and Folklore, the "message" of Lover, and the "mistakes" of Reputation. NME's Hannah Mylrea also found influences of 1989 together with Evermore's "folklorian" sound. Mylrea and Alexis Petridis of The Guardian wrote that the song could have turned out to be a full-on pop single had it incorporated more embellishments, but both upheld the original arrangement as tasteful. Writing for DIY, Ben Tipple remarked that the track "brilliantly" insinuates at a "reinvigorated full-production Taylor". In a less enthusiastic review, Consequence's Mary Siroky opined that the track "may not rise to the top" but compared it to smudges in a set of crystal wine glasses.

== Credits and personnel ==
Credits are adapted from the liner notes of Evermore.

- Taylor Swift – vocals, songwriter
- Aaron Dessner – producer, songwriter, recording engineer, drum machine, synth bass, percussion, keyboards, synthesizers, bass, acoustic guitar, electric guitar
- Bryce Dessner – orchestration, electric guitar
- Bryan Devendorf – drum kit
- James McAlister – drum machine, synthesizers
- Yuki Numata Resnick – violin
- Kyle Resnick – trumpet
- Clarice Jensen – cello
- Jason Treuting – crotales, metal percussion
- Jonathan Low – mixing, recording engineer
- Greg Calbi – mastering
- Steve Fallone – mastering

== Charts ==
=== Weekly charts ===
Weekly chart performance for "Long Story Short"
Chart (2020–2021)	Peak position
Australia (ARIA)	49
Canada Hot 100 (Billboard)	39
Global 200 (Billboard)	55
Portugal (AFP)	198
UK Audio Streaming (Official Charts)	84
US Billboard Hot 100	68
US Hot Rock & Alternative Songs (Billboard)	14
US Rolling Stone Top 100	42

=== Year-end chart ===
Year-end chart performance for "Long Story Short"
Chart (2021)	Position
US Hot Rock & Alternative Songs (Billboard)	65

== Certifications ==
Certifications for "Long Story Short"
Region	Certification	Certified units/sales
Australia (ARIA)	Gold	35,000^{‡}
Brazil (Pro-Música Brasil)	Gold	20,000^{‡}
New Zealand (RMNZ)	Gold	15,000^{‡}
United Kingdom (BPI)	Silver	200,000^{‡}
^{‡} Sales+streaming figures based on certification alone.
