= Coney Island (Taylor Swift song) =

2021 single by Taylor Swift featuring the National

Single by Taylor Swift featuring the National

from the album Evermore
- Released: January 18, 2021
- Recorded: 2020
- Studio: Long Pond (Hudson Valley); Knobworld (Los Angeles)
- Genre: Alt-rock; indie folk
- Length: 4:35
- Label: Republic
- Songwriters: Taylor Swift; William Bowery; Aaron Dessner; Bryce Dessner
- Producers: Aaron Dessner; Bryce Dessner

Taylor Swift singles chronology
"No Body, No Crime" (2021)	"Coney Island" (2021)	"Gasoline" (2021)

The National singles chronology
"Never Tear Us Apart" (2020)	"Coney Island" (2021)	"Somebody Desperate" (2021)

Lyric video
- "Coney Island" on YouTube

"Coney Island" is a song by the American singer-songwriter Taylor Swift featuring the American band the National. Swift, William Bowery, and the brothers Aaron and Bryce Dessner wrote the song for Swift's ninth studio album, Evermore (2020). The track was produced by the Dessner brothers, and Matt Berninger contributed guest vocals. An alternative rock and indie folk song, "Coney Island" features lyrics that depict a separated couple reflecting on their past relationship.

Republic Records released the track to adult album alternative radio in the United States on January 18, 2021. Some music critics commended the vocal chemistry between Swift and Berninger, while others deemed his vocal performance out of place; they generally considered "Coney Island" a standout track on Evermore. It peaked at number 45 on the Billboard Global 200 and reached the national charts of Australia, Canada, Portugal, and the United States, receiving certifications in Australia, Brazil, New Zealand, and the United Kingdom. Swift performed it live three times on her sixth concert tour, the Eras Tour (2023–2024).

== Background and release ==
During the COVID-19 lockdowns, Taylor Swift wrote and produced her eighth studio album, Folklore, with Aaron Dessner and Jack Antonoff. Surprise-released on July 24, 2020, it was met with critical acclaim and commercial success. The album incorporated new styles for Swift and departed from the maximalist pop sound of her previous works. In September 2020, Swift, Antonoff, and Dessner assembled at Long Pond Studio in the Hudson Valley to film Folklore: The Long Pond Studio Sessions, a documentary that features Swift performing all of the seventeen tracks of Folklore and discussing the creative process and inspirations behind the album. After filming, the three celebrated Folklore's success and unexpectedly continued writing songs while staying at Long Pond. The result was Swift's ninth studio album, Evermore, which she described as a "sister record" to Folklore. It was surprise-released on December 11, 2020, with "Coney Island" appearing as its ninth track. Republic Records released the song to US adult album alternative radio on January 18, 2021.

== Production and composition ==
Dessner and his twin brother, Bryce, sent Swift some of the instrumentals they made for their band, the National, including the instrumental of "Coney Island". Swift and William Bowery wrote its lyrics and recorded her vocals. After listening to the demo, the four collectively observed that the song was closely connected to the National, envisioning Matt Berninger (the band's lead vocalist) singing it and Bryan Devendorf (the drummer) playing its drums. Dessner informed Berninger, who was "excited" for the idea; the band assembled to work on the track.

Dessner recorded "Coney Island" at Long Pond with Jonathan Low, who recorded Swift's vocals with Robin Baynton and mixed the track. Greg Calbi and Steve Fallone mastered it at Sterling Sound Studios in Edgewater, New Jersey, and Sean O'Brien recorded Berninger's vocals at Knobworld Studios in Los Angeles. Dessner provided drum machine programming with Devendorf and played acoustic guitar, electric guitar, bass guitar, high-string guitar, and synthesizer; his brother Bryce played piano and synthesizer and was the orchestrator for the cello (Clarice Jensen), drums (Devendorf and Jason Treuting), violin (Yuki Numata Resnick), and percussion (Treuting). Devendorf's brother, Scott, played bass guitar and pocket piano for the track.

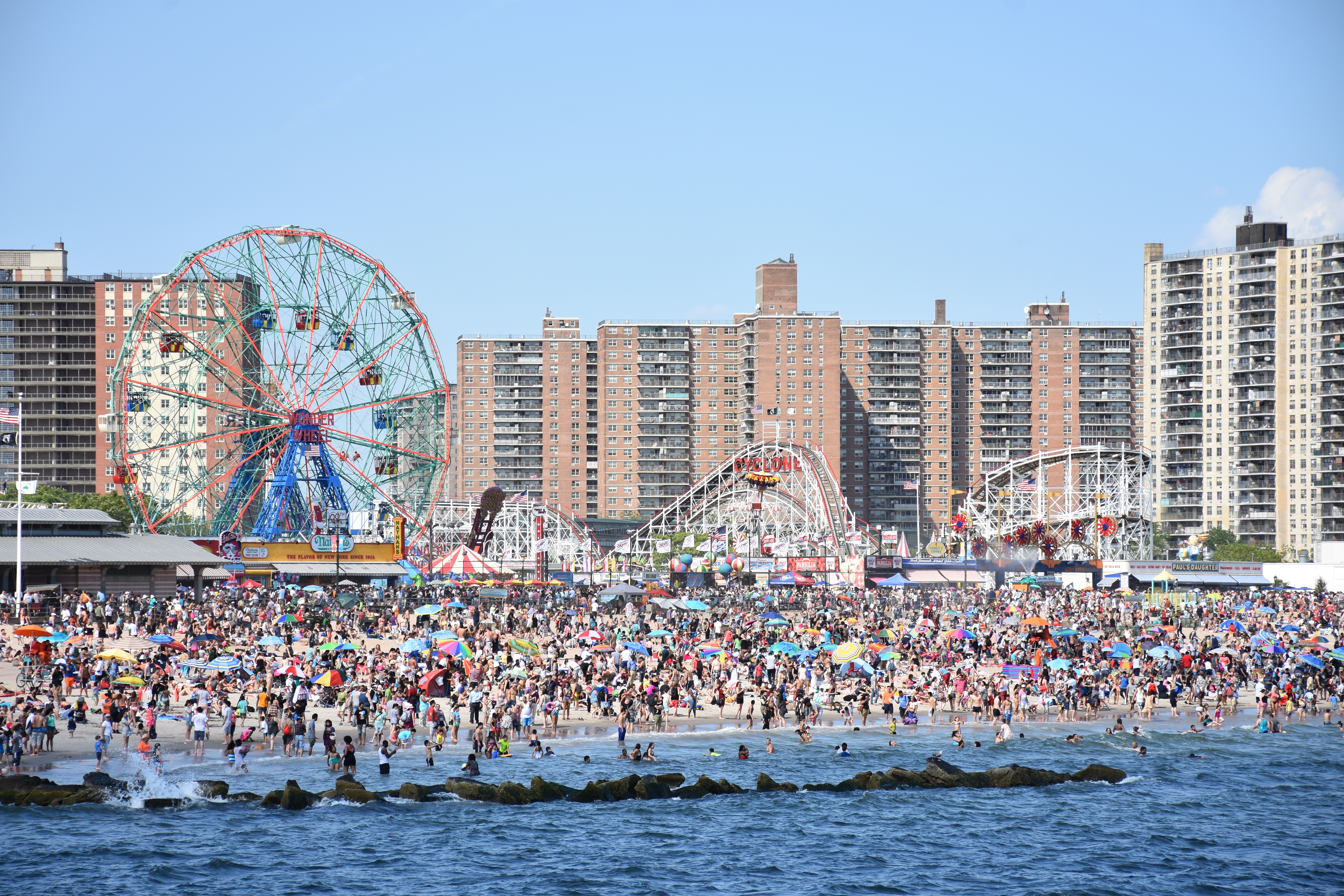
The narrative of "Coney Island" is set in Coney Island, an entertainment area in New York City.

At 4 minutes and 35 seconds long, "Coney Island" is an alternative rock and indie folk song. Swift sings with a breathy head voice and a mezzo-soprano singing voice, while Berninger sings with a baritone voice from the second verse through to the end of the song. (Note: Attributed to Olivier, The Washington Post's Sonia Rao, and Beats Per Minute's Ray Finlayson.) The narrative revolves around a story set in Coney Island, an entertainment area in New York City, where Swift and Berninger alternately express the viewpoints of two former lovers who contemplate their past relationship and blame each other. The lyrics convey the emotion of feeling lost in a failed romantic relationship ("Breaking my soul into two looking for you/ But you're right here/ If I can't relate to you anymore/ Then who am I related to?"). Berninger sings in his verse about the feeling of self-absorption that resulted in losing the partner ("The question pounds my head/ 'What's a lifetime of achievement?'/ If I pushed you to the edge/ But you were too polite to leave me"). In the refrain, Swift sings, "I'm on a bench on Coney Island, wondering where did my baby go", before rhyming it with "the bright lights, the merry go", in a reference to merry-go-rounds.

== Critical reception ==
Some music critics praised the vocal chemistry between Swift and Berninger and considered "Coney Island" a highlight from Evermore. (Note: Attributed to Olivier, The Daily Telegraph's Neil McCormick, Vulture's Craig Jenkins, Rolling Stone's Rob Sheffield, and The Line of Best Fit's Ross Horton.) Spin's Bobby Olivier described it as a "wonderfully dark duet" and lauded the fusion of Swift's and Berninger's vocals, and Stereogum's Tom Breihan similarly considered it the darkest track on the album, alike "The Last Time" in Swift's fourth studio album, Red (2012). The Daily Telegraph's Neil McCormick deemed it one of Evermore's "strangest songs" and believed that Berninger's performance elevated the song's quality; he added that Swift's "lucid and melodious" vocals counterpointed "the mumbled intensity" of Berninger's baritone. Variety's Chris Willman compared "Coney Island" to "Exile" (2020), another similar duet on Folklore, and found the lyric "We were like the mall before the internet/ It was the one place to be" a "rare laugh line".

Some critics commented on the songwriting and Berninger's vocal performance. The Guardian's Alexis Petridis thought "Coney Island" had lackluster songwriting that lacks in depth and believed it would have been a forgettable track without Berninger's performance. On the contrary, Pitchfork's Sam Sodomsky and Beats Per Minute's Ray Finlayson opined that his vocals felt out of place on the song. The latter felt "Coney Island" sounded like a conversation between a father and his daughter rather than two romantic partners due to the vocal differences between Swift and Berninger. The track appeared in rankings of Swift's discography by Rolling Stone's Rob Sheffield (31 out of 286) and Vulture's Nate Jones (181 out of 245).

== Commercial performance ==
"Coney Island" debuted at number 45 on the Billboard Global 200 chart dated December 26, 2020. In the United States, it reached number 12 on the Billboard Hot Rock & Alternative Songs chart, number 18 on the Billboard Adult Alternative Songs chart, number 32 on the Rolling Stone Top 100 chart, and number 63 on the Billboard Hot 100 chart. The track peaked at number 31 in Canada, number 42 in Australia, and number 150 in Portugal. It reached number 8 on the Ultratip Bubbling Under 100 chart in Flanders and number 75 on the Audio Streaming chart in the United Kingdom. The track received gold certifications in Australia, Brazil, and New Zealand, and a silver certification in the United Kingdom.

== Live performances ==
Swift performed "Coney Island" on piano as a "surprise song" three times on the Eras Tour (2023–2024). She played it for the first time at the first Atlanta show on April 28, 2023. She performed it with Sabrina Carpenter as part of a mashup with Swift's single "White Horse" (2008) at the first Sydney show of the tour on February 23, 2024; Billboard's Hannah Dailey picked the performance as one of the best 25 moments from the tour. Swift played the track in a mashup with her song "My Boy Only Breaks His Favorite Toys" (2024) at the sixth show in London on August 17, 2024.

== Personnel ==
Credits are adapted from the liner notes of Evermore.

- Taylor Swift – lead vocals, songwriter
- The National – featured artist
  - Aaron Dessner – songwriter, producer, recording engineer, drum machine programming, acoustic guitar, electric guitar, bass guitar, high-string guitar, synthesizer
  - Bryce Dessner – songwriter, producer, orchestrator, piano, synthesizer
  - Bryan Devendorf – drum machine programmer, drums
  - Scott Devendorf – bass guitar, pocket piano
  - Matt Berninger – vocals
- William Bowery – songwriter
- Jonathan Low – mixer, recording engineer, Swift's vocal recording engineer
- Robin Baynton – Swift's vocal recording engineer
- Sean O'Brien – Berninger's vocal recording engineer
- Greg Calbi – mastering engineer
- Steve Fallone – mastering engineer
- Jason Treuting – drums, percussion
- Yuki Numata Resnick – violin
- Clarice Jensen – cello

== Charts ==
Chart performance for "Coney Island"Chart performance of "Coney Island"
Chart (2020)	Peak position
Australia (ARIA)	42
Belgium (Ultratip Bubbling Under Flanders)	8
Global 200 (Billboard)	45
Canada Hot 100 (Billboard)	31
Portugal (AFP)	150
UK Audio Streaming (Official Charts)	75
US Billboard Hot 100	63
US Adult Alternative Airplay (Billboard)	18
US Hot Rock & Alternative Songs (Billboard)	12
US Rolling Stone Top 100	32

== Certifications ==
Certifications for "Coney Island"
Region	Certification	Certified units/sales
Australia (ARIA)	Gold	35,000^{‡}
Brazil (Pro-Música Brasil)	Gold	20,000^{‡}
New Zealand (RMNZ)	Gold	15,000^{‡}
United Kingdom (BPI)	Silver	200,000^{‡}
^{‡} Sales+streaming figures based on certification alone.
