= Happiness (Taylor Swift song) =

2020 song by Taylor Swift

Song by Taylor Swift

from the album Evermore
- Written: c. December 2020
- Released: December 11, 2020
- Studio: Long Pond (Hudson Valley); Scarlet Pimpernel (UK)
- Genre: Ambient
- Length: 5:15
- Label: Republic
- Songwriters: Taylor Swift; Aaron Dessner
- Producer: Aaron Dessner

Lyric video
- "Happiness" on YouTube

"Happiness" is a song by the American singer-songwriter Taylor Swift from her ninth studio album, Evermore (2020). She wrote the song with Aaron Dessner, who produced it using an instrumental track he had written in 2019. An ambient song and a sentimental ballad that features a midtempo rhythm, "Happiness" has piano, guitar, and synthesizer instrumentation generated by a slow drone that crescendos. The lyrics are about a narrator finding happiness after a divorce.

Music critics praised "Happiness" for its songwriting and production; several of whom picked it as a highlight from Evermore and one of the best songs in Swift's discography. Commercially, the track peaked at number 33 on the Billboard Global 200 and reached the national charts of Australia, Canada, Portugal, and the United States. It received certifications in Australia, Brazil, New Zealand, and the United Kingdom. Swift performed "Happiness" live once on piano during the Eras Tour (2023–2024).

== Background and release ==
Following the critical and commercial success of her eighth studio album, Folklore (2020), Taylor Swift and the album's collaborators, including Aaron Dessner, assembled at Long Pond Studio in the Hudson Valley to film the documentary Folklore: The Long Pond Studio Sessions (2020). Both musicians continued writing songs at Long Pond, with Swift penning lyrics to Dessner's instrumental tracks, a process that was present on much of the songs they had worked on Folklore. Their sessions resulted in a studio album titled Evermore, which Swift described as a "sister record" to Folklore. "Happiness" is the seventh track on Evermore, which was surprise-released by Republic Records on December 11, 2020. On July 23, 2024, Swift performed the track on piano at the first Hamburg show of the Eras Tour (2023–2024), as part of a mashup with her song "We Were Happy" (2021).

== Production ==
"Happiness" was the last track written for Evermore. Dessner had been working on the song's composition since 2019 and believed that it would be a track for his band, Big Red Machine. Swift was fond of the instrumental and wrote the lyrics to it with Dessner days before Evermore was finished, and it was eventually included on the album. The song was recorded by Dessner and Jonathan Low at Long Pond, and Swift's vocals were recorded by Robin Baynton at Scarlet Pimpernel Studios in the United Kingdom. "Happiness" was mixed by Low at Long Pond and mastered by Greg Calbi and Steve Fallone at Sterling Sound Studios in Edgewater, New Jersey. Dessner additionally provided drum machine programming and played keyboards, synthesizers, piano, acoustic guitar, bass guitar, and electric guitar, while his brother Bryce handled the orchestration. Musicians who played instruments include Yuki Numata Resnick (violin), JT Bates (drums), Ryan Olson (Allovers Hi-Hat Generator), and Thomas Bartlett (synthesizers, keyboards).

== Music and lyrics ==
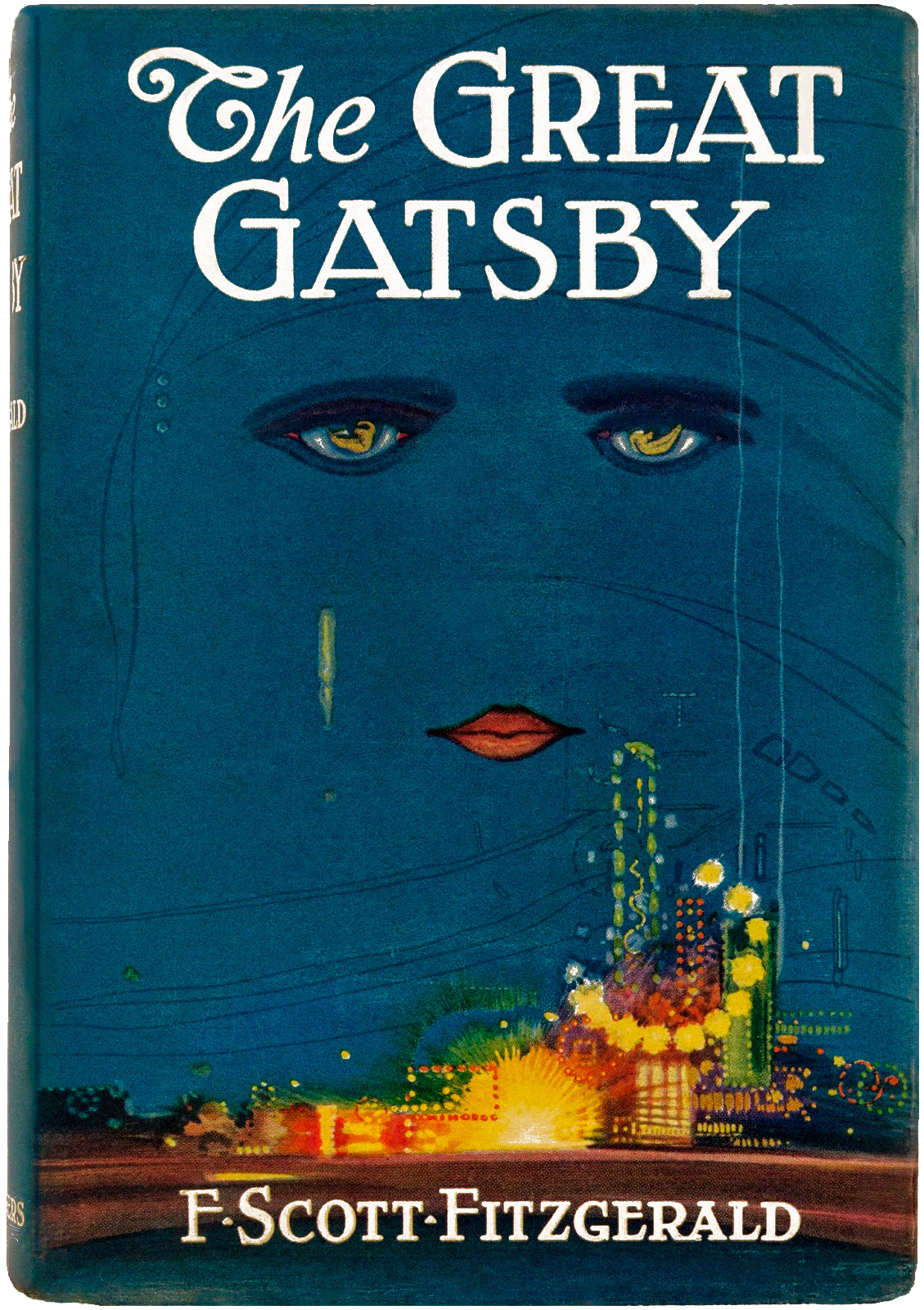
"Happiness" features references to the 1925 novel The Great Gatsby.

At five minutes and fifteen seconds long, "Happiness" is the longest track on Evermore. It is an ambient song and a sentimental ballad that features a midtempo rhythm. The production incorporates piano, guitar, and synthesizer instrumentation generated by a soft drone that crescendos. The song includes "churchy organ tones", according to Jon Pareles of The New York Times. Some music journalists described the track as "hymnal", and Claire Shaffer from Rolling Stone likened its composition to the music of the American band Chromatics.

The lyrics are about a narrator finding happiness after a divorce. Stereogum's Tom Breihan said that the narrator is in a "mid-breakup" and tries to console both herself and the person she hurt ("There'll be happiness after you/ But there was happiness because of you/ Both of these things can be true/ There is happiness"). She goes back-and-forth in her account of the relationship and ultimately expresses feelings of bitterness: "I hope she'll be a beautiful fool/ Who takes my spot next to you/ No, I didn't mean that/ Sorry, I can't see facts through all of my fury".

"Happiness" also features themes of forgiveness, personal histories, and looking at the perspective of another person, and contains several references to the 1925 novel The Great Gatsby by F. Scott Fitzgerald. Some lyrics incorporate gothic and macabre imagery: "Past the blood and bruise/ Past the curses and cries/ Beyond the terror in the nightfall/ Haunted by the look in my eyes". Sam Sodomsky from Pitchfork believed that Swift was "striving toward more stoic, distanced writing" with "the uncharacteristic retraction" of some of the lyrics.

== Critical reception ==
Several music critics regarded "Happiness" as a highlight from Evermore (Note: Critics such as Atwood Magazine's Emily Algar and Nina Schaarschmidt, Consequence's Mary Siroky, and the Star Tribune's Jon Bream) and one of the best songs in Swift's discography. (Note: Critics such as Clash's Lauren DeHollogne, Slant Magazine's Jonathan Keefe, Stereogum's Tom Breihan, The A.V. Club's Saloni Gajjar, and Uproxx's Josh Kurp) Tom Breihan from Stereogum described it as "a masterful piece of recording and songwriting", and Nina Schaarschmidt from Atwood Magazine said she conveyed "heartbreak and its mixed feelings at its finest" in the track. Patrick Ryan from USA Today praised the song's "elegant simplicity" that rendered the songwriting remarkable. Angela Morrison of Exclaim! believed "Happiness" featured some of Swift's most mature lyricism, and Lauren DeHollogne from Clash said that the song's maturity made it more impactful. The Guardian's Alex Petridis praised "Happiness" for showcasing Swift's skill at character studies and thought that the song's bitter lyrics were more edifying than those she wrote for her 2017 album Reputation.

Several critics additionally commented on the lyricism. Jon Bream of the Star Tribune described "Happiness" as a "haunting, hushed reflection" on a fading romance. Lowndes Commander from Atwood Magazine considered it a lyrical standout from Evermore: "The song as a whole is a hopeful one, a beautiful reflection of what once was and a bold look forward at what might be". Saloni Gajjar of The A.V. Club deemed it one of the saddest tracks on Evermore due to its "oddly hopeful" lyrics, and the music journalist Annie Zaleski from the same publication selected it as one of the album's "most poignant" songs. On a less enthusiastic side, The Ringer's Rob Harvilla considered it one of the less interesting tracks on the album's first half, and Spencer Kornhaber of The Atlantic criticized how Swift mixed the metaphors to the point they were excessively condensed.

Some critics commended the production and its soundscape. Sodomsky believed that Swift stepped away from the album's thorough narratives in "Happiness" and allowed the music to highlight its own emotional resonance, and Billboard's Jason Lipshutz similarly thought that the song's "ornate" folk arrangement served as its own emotional hook. Ellen Johnson from Paste viewed it as one of the tracks that represented Evermore as a peaceful and intimate album. Gajjar thought that it had a mature and sorrowful essence that was "elevated by Swift's ethereal vocals". Allaire Nuss of Entertainment Weekly believed that the refrain encapsulated the album's spirit, and Harvilla said the song featured a "striking serenity".

== Commercial performance ==
"Happiness" peaked at number 33 on the Billboard Global 200 chart dated December 26, 2020. It reached the national charts of Canada (24), Australia (37), and Portugal (142). In the United States, the track debuted and peaked at number 54 on the Billboard Hot 100 chart, where it extended Swift's total entries to 128. On the Hot Rock & Alternative Songs chart, "Happiness" reached number nine and charted for ten weeks. It appeared on the chart's 2021 year-end at number 58. The song additionally peaked at number 66 on the Audio Streaming Chart in the United Kingdom. "Happiness" received gold certifications in Australia, Brazil, and New Zealand, and a silver certification in the United Kingdom.

== Personnel ==
Credits are adapted from the liner notes of Evermore.

- Taylor Swift – vocals, songwriter
- Aaron Dessner – songwriter, producer, recording engineer, drum machine programming, keyboards, synthesizers, piano, acoustic guitar, bass guitar, electric guitar
- Bryce Dessner – orchestration
- JT Bates – drums
- Ryan Olson – Allovers Hi-Hat Generator
- Thomas Bartlett – synthesizers, keyboards
- Yuki Numata Resnick – violin
- Robin Baynton – vocal recording engineer
- Jonathan Low – mixing engineer, recording engineer
- Greg Calbi – mastering engineer
- Steve Fallone – mastering engineer

== Charts ==
=== Weekly charts ===
Weekly chart performance for "Happiness"
Chart (2020–2021)	Peak position
Australia (ARIA)	37
Canada Hot 100 (Billboard)	24
Global 200 (Billboard)	33
Portugal (AFP)	142
UK Audio Streaming (OCC)	66
US Billboard Hot 100	52
US Hot Rock & Alternative Songs (Billboard)	9

=== Year-end chart ===
Year-end chart performance for "Happiness"
Chart (2021)	Position
US Hot Rock & Alternative Songs (Billboard)	58

== Certifications ==
Certifications for "Happiness"
Region	Certification	Certified units/sales
Australia (ARIA)	Gold	35,000^{‡}
Brazil (Pro-Música Brasil)	Gold	20,000^{‡}
New Zealand (RMNZ)	Gold	15,000^{‡}
United Kingdom (BPI)	Silver	200,000^{‡}
^{‡} Sales+streaming figures based on certification alone.
