= Twang =

Onomatopoeia describing the sound of a musical string being plucked

Twang is an onomatopoeia originally used to describe the sound of a vibrating bow string after the arrow is released.

By extension, it applies to the similar vibration produced when the string of a musical instrument is plucked, and similar sounds.

The term came to be applied to a bright, focused, “ringing” vocal quality produced by narrowing the aryepiglottic sphincter.

Later, however, the term came to be more broadly associated with regional dialects, to the extent that in some locations, "a twang is a desirable commodity".

Specific uses of the term include:

- A particular sharp vibrating sound characteristic of some electric guitars.
- A high frequency singing sound especially affected by country singers. It allows for a higher vocal reach than would be possible using the standard guttural technique and can be used as an alternative to falsetto singing. Willie Nelson almost always sings with a twang voice.
- Rock and roll guitarist Duane Eddy utilized the twang sound during his career; his major label debut was entitled Have 'Twangy' Guitar Will Travel.

== See also ==
- Jangle
- Jangle rock
- Jangle pop
