= Steve Fallone =

Mastering engineer

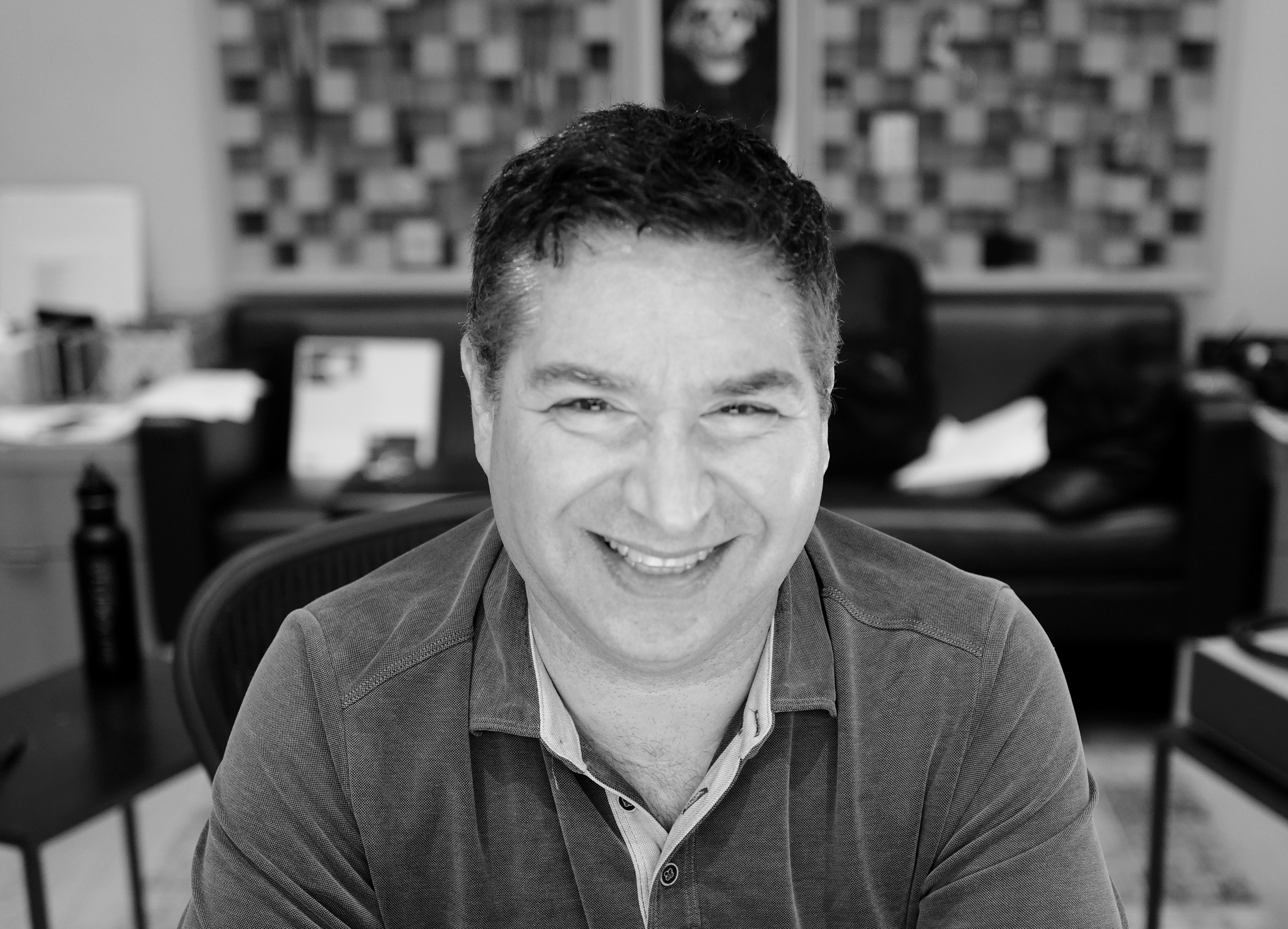
Steve Fallone at Sterling Sound mastering studios

Steve Fallone is a mastering engineer at Sterling Sound. He won at the 61st Annual Grammy Awards in 2019 for his work on Golden Hour by Kacey Musgraves and also at the 64th Annual Grammy Awards for his work on Love For Sale.
