= Carl Wilson (writer) =

Canadian music critic

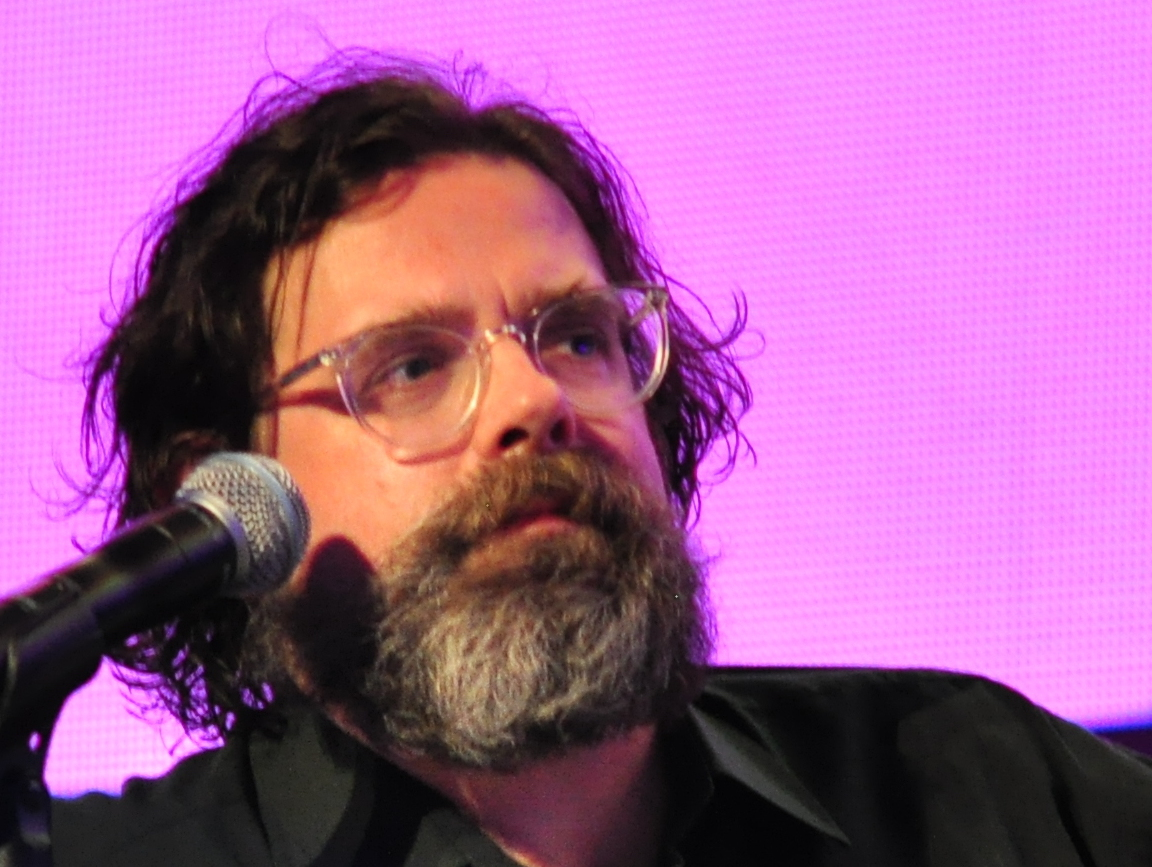
- Carl Wilson on the keynote panel of Pop Conference 2015.
- Occupations: Music critic, journalist
- Writing career
- Subject: Popular music

Carl Wilson is a Canadian music critic who has written for many publications including The Globe and Mail. As of 2022, he writes for Slate. He started the Zoilus blog. He is most well known for his book Let's Talk About Love: A Journey to the End of Taste. It was published in Continuum's 33 1/3 series. Though set up as a critique of Celine Dion's album Let's Talk About Love, Wilson attempts to critique himself and music criticism in general. In 2014, an expanded version of Let's Talk About Love was released, featuring essays by, among others, James Franco, Mary Gaitskill, Nick Hornby, and Krist Novoselic.

== See also ==
- Poptimism
