= One More Haim Tour =

2022 concert tour by Haim

- Tour by Haim
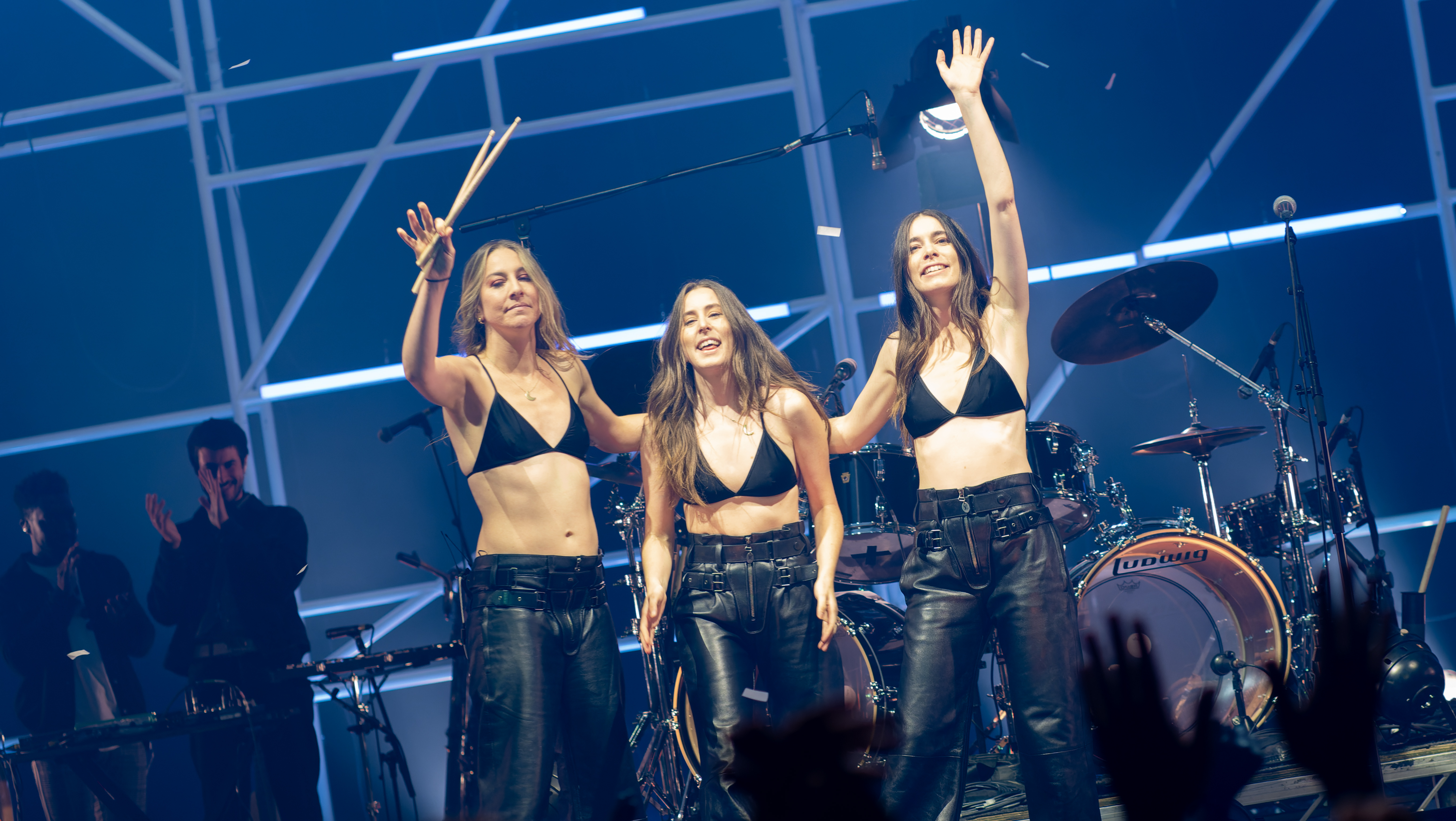
- Haim performing at the O2 Arena in London on July 21, 2022
- Location: North America, Europe
- Associated album: Women in Music Pt. III
- Start date: April 24, 2022
- End date: September 24, 2022
- Legs: 2
- No. of shows: 45: 30 in North America; 15 in Europe

Haim concert chronology
- Sister Sister Sister Tour (2018); One More Haim Tour (2022); I Quit Tour (2025)

The One More Haim Tour was the third headlining tour by the American pop rock band Haim in support of their third studio album Women in Music Pt. III (2020). The 45-stop tour began on April 24, 2022, in Las Vegas, Nevada at the Cosmopolitan and ended on September 24, 2022, at Firefly Music Festival in Dover, Delaware.

== Background ==
On December 6, 2021, Haim announced a 27-date North American tour via a video on their Twitter of the sisters dancing to "What Dreams Are Made Of" from The Lizzie McGuire Movie (2003) followed by an announcement of a tour with dates and venues listed at the end. Several stops on their European leg were delayed dates from a planned 2021 tour, which was postponed due to COVID-19-restrictions at the time. Two stops on the tour featured the band opening for the Red Hot Chili Peppers on their 2022 Global Stadium Tour.

== Setlist ==
This set list is representative of the performance on May 31, 2022. It is not representative of all concerts for the duration of the tour.

1. "Now I'm in It"
2. "I Know Alone"
3. "Up from a Dream" (Alana lead vocals)
4. "My Song 5"
5. "Want You Back"
6. "3AM" (Este lead vocals)
7. "I've Been Down" (Alana lead vocals)
8. "Gasoline"
9. "Leaning on You"
10. "Hallelujah"
11. "Man from the Magazine"
12. "FUBT"
13. "Los Angeles"
14. "Don't Wanna" (Este lead vocals for chorus)
15. "Forever"
16. "Summer Girl"

Encore

17. "The Wire"
18. "The Steps"

Notes

- During the band's show in Philadelphia on May 28, 2022, they invited their mother, Donna Haim, on stage and performed a cover of "Rich Girl" by Hall & Oates.
- During their London show on July 21, 2022, Taylor Swift made an appearance where they performed a mash-up of "Gasoline" and "Love Story (Taylor's Version)".

=== Festival setlist ===
This set list is representative of the performance on June 25, 2022, and Haim's subsequent festival performances from June 30 to July 9, 2022. It is not representative of all concerts for the duration of the tour.

1. "Now I'm in It"
2. "Don't Save Me"
3. "My Song 5"
4. "Want You Back"
5. "3AM" (Este lead vocals)
6. "Gasoline"
7. "Don't Wanna" (Este lead vocals for chorus)
8. "Forever"
9. "Summer Girl"
10. "The Wire"
11. "The Steps"

Notes

- "Don't Save Me" was only played during Glastonbury.

=== Red Hot Chili Peppers setlist ===
This set list is representative of the performances on July 23 and July 27, 2022, where indicated, in which Haim opened for the Red Hot Chili Peppers.

1. "Now I'm in It"
2. "My Song 5"
3. "Want You Back"
4. "3AM" (Este lead vocals)
5. "I've Been Down"
6. "Gasoline"
7. "Up From a Dream"
8. "The Wire"
9. "The Steps"

Notes

- "Up From a Dream" and "3am" were played only during the July 27 show in San Diego.

== Tour dates ==
Complete list of Tour dates
Date	City	Country	Venue	Opening Acts
North America
April 24, 2022	Las Vegas	United States	The Chelsea Ballroom	Buzzy Lee
April 25, 2022	Phoenix	United States	Arizona Federal Theatre	Buzzy Lee
April 27, 2022	Berkeley	United States	Hearst Greek Theatre	Buzzy Lee; Waxahatchee
May 1, 2022	Los Angeles	United States	Hollywood Bowl	Buzzy Lee; Waxahatchee
May 4, 2022	Austin	United States	Moody Amphitheater	Faye Webster
May 5, 2022	Irving	United States	Toyota Music Factory	Faye Webster
May 6, 2022	Houston	United States	713 Music Hall	Faye Webster
May 8, 2022	Jacksonville	United States	Daily's Place	Faye Webster
May 9, 2022	Miami	United States	Bayfront Park Amphitheater	Faye Webster
May 11, 2022	Alpharetta	United States	Ameris Bank Amphitheatre	Faye Webster
May 13, 2022	Washington, D.C.	United States	The Anthem	Faye Webster
May 14, 2022	Washington, D.C.	United States	The Anthem	Faye Webster
May 17, 2022	New York City	United States	Madison Square Garden	Princess Nokia; Faye Webster
May 24, 2022	Toronto	Canada	RBC Echo Beach	Sasami more*
May 25, 2022	Rochester Hills	United States	Meadow Brook Amphitheatre	Sasami more*
May 28, 2022	Philadelphia	United States	TD Pavilion at the Mann	Sasami more*
May 29, 2022 (Note: Rescheduled from May 19, 2022 due to positive COVID-19 cases.)	Cincinnati	United States	Andrew J. Brady Music Center	Sasami more*
May 31, 2022	Milwaukee	United States	BMO Harris Pavilion	Sasami more*
June 1, 2022	Indianapolis	United States	TCU Amphitheater	Sasami more*
June 3, 2022	Chicago	United States	Huntington Bank Pavilion	Sasami more*
June 4, 2022	Kansas City	United States	Starlight Theatre	Sasami more*
June 6, 2022	Minneapolis	United States	The Armory	Sasami more*
June 10, 2022	Vancouver	Canada	Thunderbird Sports Centre	Sasami more*
June 11, 2022	Portland	United States	Theater of the Clouds	Sasami more*
June 13, 2022	Seattle	United States	WaMu Theater	Sasami more*
June 14, 2022	Bend	United States	Hayden Homes Amphitheater	Sasami more*
Europe
June 25, 2022 (Note: The concert on June 25, 2022 at Worthy Farm in Pilton, Somerset is part of the Glastonbury Festival.)	Pilton	England	Worthy Farm	—N/a
June 28, 2022	Dublin	Ireland	Trinity College Dublin	Rachel Mae Hannon (Note: Soccer Mommy was originally to open for Dublin, but was unable to due to scheduling conflicts.)
June 30, 2022 (Note: The concert on June 30, 2022 at Werchter Festivalpark in Rotselaar, Belgium is part of Rock Werchter .)	Rotselaar	Belgium	Werchter Festivalpark	—N/a
July 1, 2022 (Note: The concert on July 1, 2022 at Groene Heuvels in Ewijk, Netherlands is part of Down the Rabbit Hole.)	Ewijk	Netherlands	Groene Heuvels	—N/a
July 2, 2022 (Note: The concert on July 2, 2022 at Roskilde Dyrskueplads in Roskilde, Denmark is part of Roskilde Festival.)	Roskilde	Denmark	Roskilde Dyrskueplads	—N/a
July 3, 2022 (Note: The concert on July 3, 2022 at Gärdet in Stockholm, Sweden is part of Lollapalooza Stockholm.)	Stockholm	Sweden	Gärdet	—N/a
July 8, 2022 (Note: The concert on July 8, 2022 at Espacio Mad Cool in Madrid, Spain is part of Mad Cool Festival.)	Madrid	Spain	Espacio Mad Cool	—N/a
July 9, 2022 (Note: The concert on July 8, 2022 at Passeio Marítimo de Algés in Lisbon, Portugal is part of NOS Alive Festival.)	Lisbon	Portugal	Passeio Marítimo de Algés	—N/a
July 13, 2022 (Note: Rescheduled from June 24, 2021 due to COVID-19 travel restrictions.)	Leeds	England	Millennium Square	Georgia
July 14, 2022 (Note: Rescheduled from June 22, 2021 and then September 23, 2021 due to COVID-19 travel restrictions.)	Glasgow	Scotland	OVO Hydro	Georgia
July 16, 2022 (Note: Rescheduled from June 15, 2021 and then September 27, 2021 due to COVID-19 travel restrictions.)	Manchester	England	O_{2} Victoria Warehouse	Georgia
July 17, 2022 (Note: Rescheduled from June 16, 2021 and then September 28, 2021 due to COVID-19 travel restrictions.)	Manchester	England	O_{2} Victoria Warehouse	Georgia
July 19, 2022 (Note: Rescheduled from June 19, 2021 and then September 24, 2021 due to COVID-19 travel restrictions.)	Nottingham	England	Motorpoint Arena Nottingham	Georgia
July 20, 2022 (Note: Rescheduled from June 23, 2021 and then September 25, 2021 due to COVID-19 travel restrictions.)	Cardiff	Wales	Motorpoint Arena Cardiff	Georgia
July 21, 2022 (Note: Rescheduled from June 18, 2021 and then September 30, 2021 due to COVID-19 travel restrictions.)	London	England	The O_{2} Arena	Georgia
North America
July 23, 2022 (Note: This show is part of the Red Hot Chili Peppers 2022 Global Stadium Tour, whom the band will be opening for.)	Denver	United States	Empower Field at Mile High	—N/a
July 27, 2022	San Diego	United States	Petco Park	—N/a
September 17, 2022 (Note: The concert on September 17, 2022 at West Banks Flat in Cleveland, Ohio as part of Moon's Man Landing.)	Cleveland	United States	West Bank Flats	—N/a
September 21, 2022 (Note: Rescheduled from May 20, 2022 due to positive COVID-19 cases.)	Nashville	United States	Ascend Amphitheater	—N/a
September 24, 2022 (Note: The concert on September 24, 2022 at The Woodlands in Dover, Delaware is part of Firefly Music Festival.)	Dover	United States	The Woodlands of Dover Motor Speedway	—N/a

=== Cancelled shows ===
Date	City	Country	Venue	Reason
May 22, 2022	Wilmington	United States	Live Oak Bank Pavilion	Positive COVID-19 cases
October 9, 2022 (Note: The concert on October 9, 2022 at Doheny State Beach in Dana Point, California was to be part of Ohana Festival.)	Dana Point	United States	Doheny State Beach	Music festival cancelled
September 18, 2022 (Note: The concert on September 18, 2022 at Forest Hills Stadium in New York, New York was to a part of The Big Climate Thing.)	New York City	United States	Forest Hills Stadium	Music festival postponed
