= Gasoline (Haim song) =

2020 song by Haim featuring Taylor Swift

Single by Haim featuring Taylor Swift

from the album Women in Music Pt. III
- Released: February 19, 2021
- Studio: Heavy Duty (Burbank, California); Effie Street (Los Angeles); Vox (Los Angeles); Matso Projects (Los Angeles); Strongroom (London); Kitty Committe (East London)
- Genre: Pop rock
- Length: 3:13
- Label: Columbia
- Songwriters: Alana Haim; Danielle Haim; Este Haim; Rostam Batmanglij
- Producers: Ariel Rechtshaid; Danielle Haim; Rostam Batmanglij

Haim singles chronology
"No Body, No Crime" (2021)	"Gasoline" (2021)	"Lost Track" (2022)

Taylor Swift singles chronology
"Coney Island" (2021)	"Gasoline" (2021)	"Renegade" (2021)

Audio video
- "Gasoline" on YouTube

"Gasoline" is a song by American band Haim from their third studio album Women in Music, Pt. III (2020). The song was written by the band members along with Rostam Batmanglij, and produced by Batmanglij, Danielle Haim, and Ariel Rechtshaid. A remix of "Gasoline" with American singer-songwriter Taylor Swift was included as one of two bonus tracks of the album's expanded edition. The remix was released as a single on February 19, 2021, by Columbia Records. It marks Haim's second collaboration with Swift, following "No Body, No Crime" on Swift's Evermore (2020).

== Background ==
Haim first shared the song in a live performance on Instagram on June 18, 2020, a little over a week before the release of Women in Music, Pt. III.

In December 2020, Haim contributed featured vocals to the song "No Body, No Crime", the second single from Taylor Swift's 2020 studio album, Evermore. When Haim began to work on the expanded edition of Women in Music Pt. III, they reached out to Swift to contribute vocals to "Gasoline" as she had previously told them that "Gasoline" was her favorite song on the album. In an Instagram post about the collaboration they said that Swift "brought such amazing ideas and new imagery to the song and truly gave it a new life." In February 2021, Haim posted a photo across social media, in which the three sisters stand in a gas station, in black, Amélie-inspired wigs with asymmetrical bangs. Fans noticed a petrol pump labelled "13" in the background and associated it with Swift's favorite number, 13. The band teased fans a potential collaboration with Swift again, via videos on TikTok.

The remix of "Gasoline" featuring Swift was included on the expanded edition of Women in Music Pt. III. The song is three minutes and 13 seconds in length.

== Composition ==
"Gasoline" is a "dreamy, guitar-sliding" "truly sensual slow jam that was made for making out all night in the car". The song contains lyrics about Danielle Haim's depression, with her "pleading to get out from under". Musically, "Gasoline" is a pop rock song. The song is three minutes and 13 seconds in length.

== Live performances ==
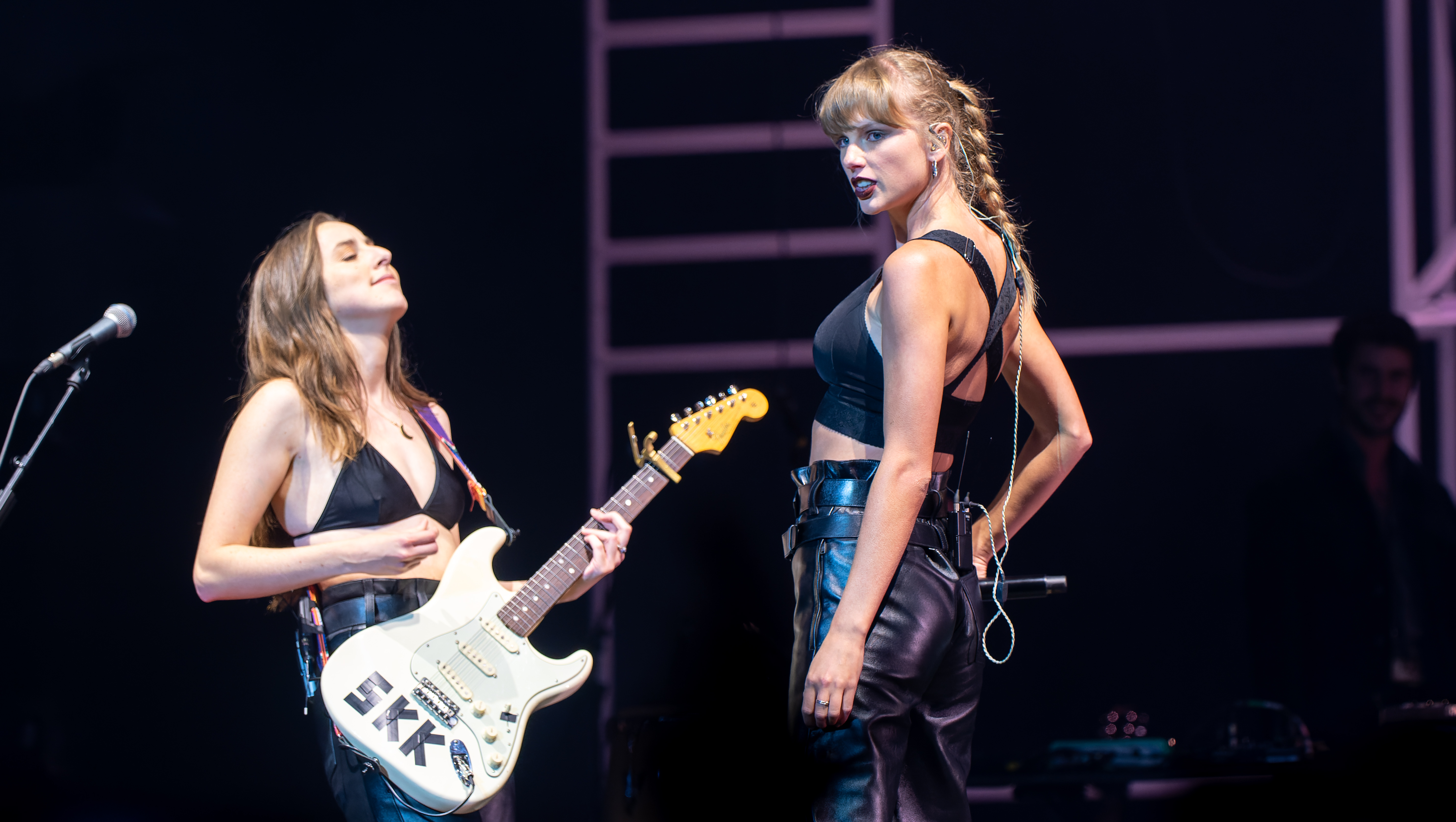
Swift (right) and Haim (Alana Haim on the left) performing "Gasoline" remix at the O2 Arena, London

On August 20, 2020, "Gasoline" was performed on the Grammy Awards's "Press Play" show. On September 29, 2020, Haim performed the song remotely on Jimmy Kimmel Live! in the empty parking lot of The Forum in Los Angeles. They performed the song on CBS This Morning on November 28, 2020. Swift, in a surprise appearance, joined the band at the O2 in London on their One More Haim Tour to perform the "Gasoline" remix mashed-up with Swift's song "Love Story".

== Credits and personnel ==
Credits are adapted from Tidal.

- Alana Haim – lead vocals, songwriting, electric guitar
- Danielle Haim – lead vocals, songwriting, production, drums, electric guitar
- Este Haim – lead vocals, songwriting, bass
- Taylor Swift – lead vocals (remix only)
- Rostam Batmanglij – songwriting, production, accordion, acoustic guitar, bass, electric guitar, engineering
- Ariel Rechtshaid – production, engineering, guitar, programming
- Emily Lazar – mastering
- Tom Elmhirst – mixing
- Chris Rowe – engineering (remix only)
- Dave Schiffman – engineering
- Jasmine Chen – engineering
- Joey Messina-Doerning – engineering
- John DeBold – engineering
- Matt DiMona – engineering
- Chris Allgood – assistant engineering

== Charts ==
=== Original version ===
Chart performance for "Gasoline"
Chart (2020)	Peak position
US Hot Rock & Alternative Songs (Billboard)	30

=== Taylor Swift remix ===
Chart performance for "Gasoline" featuring Taylor Swift
Chart (2021)	Peak position
Belgium (Ultratip Bubbling Under Flanders)	28
New Zealand Hot Singles (RMNZ)	23
UK Singles Downloads (Official Charts)	55
US Hot Rock & Alternative Songs (Billboard)	21

== Release history ==
Release dates and formats for "Gasoline"
Region	Date	Format	Version	Label	Ref.
Australia	February 19, 2021	Contemporary hit radio	Taylor Swift remix	Universal Music Australia	
United Kingdom	February 20, 2021	Digital download; streaming	Taylor Swift remix	Universal Music UK	
United Kingdom	June 12, 2021	7-inch vinyl	Original b/w Taylor Swift remix	Polydor Records	
United States	June 12, 2021	7-inch vinyl	Original b/w Taylor Swift remix	Columbia Records	
