= Sammi Kane Kraft =

American actress (1992–2012)

- Kraft in 2005
- Born: April 2, 1992; Livingston, New Jersey, U.S.
- Died: October 9, 2012 (aged 20); Los Angeles, California, U.S.
- Resting place: Hillside Memorial Park Cemetery
- Occupations: Actress; musician; athlete
- Years active: 2005–2012

Sammi Kane Kraft (April 2, 1992 – October 9, 2012) was an American baseball player, musician and actress.

Born in Livingston, New Jersey, she starred in the 2005 remake of Bad News Bears as Amanda Wurlitzer. She was featured in an ESPN.com Page 2-story about her athletic skills, and competed in the Junior Olympics. She began a garage folk project in San Francisco under the name of Scary Girls and continued to record music.

== Death ==
On October 9, 2012, at 1:30 am, Kraft was riding in the passenger seat of a car when it rear-ended a semi trailer and was then struck by another vehicle, according to the California Highway Patrol. Subsequently, she was pronounced dead at the Cedars-Sinai Medical Center.

Alana Haim of the rock band Haim has the initials "SKK" taped to her guitar in memory of Kraft. The third verse of Haim's 2020 song, "Hallelujah", is about the effect of Kraft's death on Alana, who was best friends with her at the time of her death.

Kraft's heart was donated by her parents to Yvonne Payne, wife of television personality Charles Payne.
