= I Quit (album) =

Studio album by Haim
- Released: June 20, 2025
- Genre: Soft rock
- Length: 52:55
- Labels: Columbia; Polydor
- Producers: Danielle Haim; Rostam Batmanglij; Buddy Ross

Haim chronology
Women in Music Pt. III (2020)	I Quit (2025)

Singles from I Quit
- 1. "Relationships" Released: March 12, 2025; 2. "Everybody's Trying to Figure Me Out" Released: April 4, 2025; 3. "Down to Be Wrong" Released: April 24, 2025; 4. "Take Me Back" Released: May 30, 2025; 5. "All Over Me" Released: June 20, 2025

I Quit (stylized in sentence case) is the fourth studio album by the American rock band Haim. It was released on June 20, 2025, in the United States by Columbia Records and internationally by Polydor Records, as their first studio album since Women in Music Pt. III (2020). It was a commercial success, earning the band their highest spot on the US Top Albums Sales chart.

Produced by Danielle Haim and Rostam Batmanglij, with co-production from Buddy Ross, I Quit was supported by the singles "Relationships", "Everybody's Trying to Figure Me Out", "Down to Be Wrong", "Take Me Back", and "All Over Me". The album received generally favorable reviews from music critics upon its release. To support the album, the band embarked on the I Quit Tour (2025).

In October 2025, an expanded version of the album was issued with three additional songs including "Tie You Down" in collaboration with Bon Iver, featuring a duet between Danielle Haim and Justin Vernon.

== Background and recording ==
On January 16, 2023, the trio was reported to have returned to the recording studio for their fourth studio album. In August that year, they hinted at a collaboration with British-Indian musician Jai Paul and were hoping to release new music soon.

I Quit is a fifteen-track album predominantly produced by Danielle Haim and Rostam Batmanglij. It is the band's first album not to feature production from longtime producer Ariel Rechtshaid, Danielle Haim's former partner. The rock-influenced project is "the closest [they] have ever gotten to how [they] wanted to sound" while the recording process turned out to be a "completely different experience", according to Alana Haim. Danielle Haim described working with Batmanglij as "very quick, kinetic" as opposed to previous recording sessions with him. As with the cover of their previous studio album, American filmmaker Paul Thomas Anderson once again shot the album artwork.

== Promotion ==
The album rollout mainly included parodying "early 2000s paparazzi photos". All single artworks paid homage to memes or paparazzi photos of famous break-ups and divorces, including the likes of Jared Leto, Nicole Kidman, and Kate Moss. The lead single, "Relationships", was released on March 12, 2025, followed by the second single, "Everybody's Trying to Figure Me Out", on April 4.

On April 23, Haim held one of two surprise concerts at the Bellwether theater in Los Angeles, their first full concert in nearly two years. During the gig, the band played in front of a screen with the words "I quit" which was later announced to be the title of the album. The trio performed their previously released singles as well as the live debut of the third single, "Down to Be Wrong", and the unreleased album cut "Blood in the Streets". The latter performance was joined by American singer Addison Rae. To support the album, the band has embarked on the I Quit Tour (2025).

== Critical reception ==
I Quit ratings
Aggregate scores
Source	Rating
AnyDecentMusic?	7.8/10
Metacritic	79/100
Review scores
Source	Rating
AllMusic	3/5 stars
Clash	9/10
The Guardian	3/5 stars
The Line of Best Fit	7/10
MusicOMH	4/5 stars
NME	4/5 stars
Paste	8.6/10
Pitchfork	7.0/10
Rolling Stone	4/5 stars
The Times	4/5 stars

According to the review aggregator Metacritic, I Quit received "generally favorable reviews" based on a weighted average score of 79 out of 100 from 24 critic scores. The review aggregator site AnyDecentMusic? compiled 24 reviews and gave the album an average of 7.8 out of 10, based on their assessment of the critical consensus.

Angie Martoccio of Rolling Stone praised I Quit as more sonically cohesive than its predecessor, Women in Music Pt. III (2020), and highlighted its themes of female empowerment. Will Hodgkinson of The Times described the album as a "colour-saturated summer classic, charming, childlike and just a little bit heartbroken." David Cobbald of The Line of Best Fit thought that it generally showcased Haim's strengths: "thoughtful songwriting, tight production, and seamless cohesion as a trio."

Some critics considered I Quit an experimental and incohesive body of work sonically. Anna Gaca of Pitchfork extended this opinion to the album's lyrical content by observing the songs' narrators are driven by indecision themselves. The Guardian's thought that I Quit's tracks "range from fiercely good and instantly replayable to somewhat bland and instantly forgettable." Mary Kate Carr from The A.V. Club wrote: "I Quit may not be the band at their peak, but it's a necessary step to close one chapter of their career and find their way to the next." Kristen S. Hé from NME similarly believed that "this record is proof that sometimes, you really do need to let go in order to grow."

== Track listing ==
All tracks are written by Alana Haim, Danielle Haim, Este Haim and Rostam Batmanglij, except where noted.

I Quit track listing (Note: All tracks are stylized in sentence case.)
No.	Title	Writer(s)	Length
1.	"Gone"	A. Haim; D. Haim; E. Haim; Batmanglij; George Michael (Note: "Gone" contains a sample of "Freedom! '90" (1990), written and performed by George Michael.)	4:19
2.	"All Over Me"		3:22
3.	"Relationships"	A. Haim; D. Haim; E. Haim; Batmanglij; Tobias Jesso Jr.; Ariel Rechtshaid; Josiah Sherman	3:22
4.	"Down to Be Wrong"		4:09
5.	"Take Me Back"	A. Haim; D. Haim; E. Haim; Jesso	3:45
6.	"Love You Right"		3:36
7.	"The Farm"		3:54
8.	"Lucky Stars"		3:18
9.	"Million Years"	A. Haim; D. Haim; E. Haim; Batmanglij; Jack Hallenbeck; Justin Vernon	3:42
10.	"Everybody's Trying to Figure Me Out"	A. Haim; D. Haim; E. Haim; Batmanglij; Vernon	3:53
11.	"Try to Feel My Pain"		2:31
12.	"Spinning"		2:54
13.	"Cry"	A. Haim; D. Haim; E. Haim; Batmanglij; Jesso	3:30
14.	"Blood on the Street"		2:58
15.	"Now It's Time"	A. Haim; D. Haim; E. Haim; Batmanglij; Cass McCombs; Adam Clayton (Note: "Now It's Time" contains a sample of "Numb" (1993), written by Adam Clayton, David Howell Evans, Paul Hewson and Larry Mullen Jr.; as performed by U2.); David Howell Evans; Paul Hewson; Larry Mullen Jr.	3:42
Total length:			52:55

I Quit (Deluxe) track listing
No.	Title	Length
16.	"Tie You Down" (with Bon Iver)	2:56
17.	"The Story of Us"	2:23
18.	"Even the Bad Times"	2:59
Total length:		61:13

Notes and sample credits

== Personnel ==
Credits adapted from Tidal.

=== Haim ===
- Alana Haim – vocals (all tracks), electric guitar (tracks 1–8, 10–12, 14, 15), synthesizer (1–3, 9, 12, 13, 15), percussion (1, 4), drums (5)
- Danielle Haim – vocals, drums, production (all tracks); electric guitar (1–4, 12, 14, 15), acoustic guitar (1), percussion (2, 3, 9), congas (4, 15), mandolin (6), guitar (8), programming (15)
- Este Haim – vocals, bass (all tracks); percussion (1, 2, 5, 7–9, 12, 13, 15), tambourine (4)

=== Additional musicians ===
- Rostam Batmanglij – acoustic guitar (1, 2, 4–8, 10–12, 14), piano (1, 3–11, 13), Hammond organ (1, 3, 5, 7, 13), bass (1, 3), vocals (1, 5), synthesizer (2–4, 6, 8–15), programming (2, 3, 8, 9, 12, 13, 15), mandolin (2, 5), sitar (2, 6), electric guitar (4, 5, 7, 8, 10, 11, 14), organ (4, 5, 12), background vocals (4, 14); 12-string guitar, glockenspiel, keyboards, Moog (5); shaker (7), Mellotron (13, 15)
- Buddy Ross – programming (3)
- Henry Solomon – saxophone (5)
- Jack Hallenbeck – programming, synthesizer (9)
- Gab Strum – synthesizer (9)
- Tommy King – bass (10, 11)
- Benji Lysaght – electric guitar (10, 11)
- Andrew Tachine – drums (12)
- Gabe Noel – cello, double bass (13)
- Daniel Aged – pedal steel guitar (13)
- Joey Messina-Doerning – synth bass (14), guitar (15)
- Amir Yaghmai – steel guitar (14)
- Nathan Kay – trumpet (11)

=== Technical ===
- Rostam Batmanglij – production (all tracks), engineering (all tracks); mixing (7, 15)
- Buddy Ross – co-production, engineering (3)
- Jack Hallenbeck – additional production (9)
- Emily Lazar – mastering
- Dave Fridmann – mixing (1–6, 8–14)
- Evan Pruett – engineering
- Joey Messina-Doerning – engineering
- Kyle Henderson – engineering (4, 6–8, 10–14)
- Lauren Marquez – engineering (15)
- Bob DeMaa – mastering assistance

== Charts ==
=== Weekly charts ===
Weekly chart performance for I Quit
Chart (2025)	Peak position
Australian Albums (ARIA)	20
Austrian Albums (Ö3 Austria)	16
Belgian Albums (Ultratop Flanders)	20
Belgian Albums (Ultratop Wallonia)	117
Dutch Albums (Album Top 100)	48
German Albums (Offizielle Top 100)	19
Irish Albums (Official Charts)	36
Japanese Digital Albums (Oricon)	38
Japanese Rock Albums (Oricon)	11
Japanese Western Albums (Oricon)	14
Japanese Download Albums (Billboard Japan)	35
Japanese Top Albums Sales (Billboard Japan)	70
New Zealand Albums (RMNZ)	15
Scottish Albums (Official Charts)	2
Swiss Albums (Schweizer Hitparade)	37
UK Albums (Official Charts)	3
US Billboard 200	25
US Top Rock & Alternative Albums (Billboard)	3

=== Monthly charts ===
Monthly chart performance for I Quit
Chart (2025)	Position
Japanese Western Albums (Oricon)	30
