= The Steps (song) =

Single by Haim

from the album Women in Music Pt. III
- Released: March 3, 2020
- Genre: Pop rock; country pop
- Length: 4:07
- Label: Columbia
- Songwriters: Alana Haim; Danielle Haim; Este Haim; Rostam Batmanglij; Ariel Rechtshaid
- Producers: Danielle Haim; Rostam Batmanglij; Ariel Rechtshaid

Haim singles chronology
"Hallelujah" (2019)	"The Steps" (2020)	"I Know Alone" (2020)

Music video
- "The Steps" on YouTube

"The Steps" is a song by American pop rock band Haim from their third studio album Women in Music Pt. III (2020). It was written by band members Alana Haim, Este Haim and Danielle Haim with Rostam Batmanglij and Ariel Rechtshaid; the latter three also produced it. The single was released by Columbia Records on March 3, 2020 alongside the album's pre-order.

The track was regarded by several critics as one of the best songs of 2020 and was nominated for Best Rock Performance at the 63rd Grammy Awards.

== Writing and production ==
The Haim sisters worked with frequent collaborators Rostam Batmanglij and Ariel Rechtshaid for their third studio album Women in Music Pt. III. A week before turning in the album, they wrote "The Steps" in a day. The band members wanted to create an up-tempo song that could allow them to do a great performance and decided to work on a "bare-bone" rock song. The writing process for this track was different from the band's previous work, as they usually compose the melody before writing the lyrics. But for "The Steps", they created both at the same time after they started to scream the line "you don't understand me."

Danielle Haim provided the main vocals for "The Steps" and played the drums and guitar, Este Haim played the bass and Alana Haim played the acoustic guitar and recorded backing vocals. Cass McCombs also played guitar on the track.

== Music and lyrics ==
"The Steps" is a guitar-driven love song. It mixes elements of pop, country and alternative. Danielle Haim described the riff as "tough and straight to the point."

== Release and promotion ==
On March 2, 2020, Haim unveiled the cover art, title and scheduled released date of their third studio album through their social medias. They also announced that their next single, "The Steps", would be released the following day alongside the album's pre-order. The song premiered on Annie Mac's radio show on BBC Radio 1 as the host's "Hottest Record in the World." The same month, Danielle Haim filmed a guitar tutorial for BBC Radio 1's Music Lessons.

== Critical reception ==
=== Accolades ===
"The Steps" was nominated for Best Rock Performance at the 63rd Grammy Awards while its parent album was nominated for Album of the Year.

=== Year-end lists ===
"The Steps" on year-end lists
Publication	List	Rank	Ref.
Billboard	The 100 Best Songs of 2020: Staff List	57	
The Fader	The 100 Best Songs of 2020	1	
Gaffa	The Best Foreign Songs of the Year	9	
The Guardian	Laura Barton's Tracks of 2020	—N/a	
The Guardian	Laura Snapes's Tracks of 2020	—N/a	
Los Angeles Times	The 50 Best Songs of 2020	—N/a	
NME	The 50 Best Songs of 2020	23	
Noisey	The 100 Best Songs of 2020	95	
Pitchfork	The 100 Best Songs of 2020	35	
Pitchfork	The Best Music of 2020: Pitchfork Readers' Poll Results	18	
The Plain Dealer	The Best Songs of 2020	25	
Slant	The 50 Best Songs of 2020	26	
Spin	The 30 Best Songs of 2020	11	
Stereogum	Chris DeVille's Best Songs of 2020	4	
Uproxx	The Best Songs of 2020	11	

== Music video ==
The music video for "The Steps" was released alongside the song on March 3, 2020. It was directed by Paul Thomas Anderson and Danielle Haim.

== Live performances ==
Haim performed "The Steps" live for the first time on The Tonight Show Starring Jimmy Fallon on March 9, 2020, alongside three backing musicians. The following day, Haim embarked on their Deli Tour, a five-shows promotional tour sponsored by American Express. The tracklist consisted of five songs, including "The Steps" performed by the band with its co-producer and co-writer Rostam Batmanglij. Their Los Angeles performance at Canter's was filmed by Paul Thomas Anderson and posted online in June 2020.

The single was part of a three-songs set performed in May 2020 by Danielle Haim for Rolling Stone's "In My Room" series. After playing an electric guitar when she sang "Don't Wanna" and "Summer Girl", she switched to an acoustic guitar for "The Steps". The following month, on June 17, the band did a Tiny Desk Concert for NPR. The three members performed from their respective Silver Lake homes. They opened their set with "The Steps" while playing a guitar, a bass and bongos. They followed it with "I Know Alone" before American saxophonist Henry Solomon joined them for the last song of the set, "Summer Girl".

On October 24, 2020, Haim performed "The Steps" and "Summer Girl" at the 14th Go Campaign Gala and raised 10,000 dollars to help homeless UCLA students affected by the COVID-19 pandemic.

On March 14, 2021, the band performed the song at the 63rd Annual Grammy Awards.

== Charts ==
=== Weekly charts ===
Chart (2020)	Peak position
Belgium (Ultratip Bubbling Under Flanders)	20
Czech Republic (Top 20 Modern Rock)	17
US Adult Alternative Airplay (Billboard)	16
US Hot Rock & Alternative Songs (Billboard)	24

=== Year-end charts ===
Chart (2020)	Position
US Adult Alternative Songs (Billboard)	40

== Release history ==
Release dates and formats for "The Steps"
Region	Date	Format(s)	Label	Ref.
Various	March 3, 2020	Digital download; streaming	Columbia	
United States	March 30, 2020	Adult alternative radio	Columbia	
