= Sister Sister Sister Tour =

2018 concert tour by Haim

- Tour by Haim
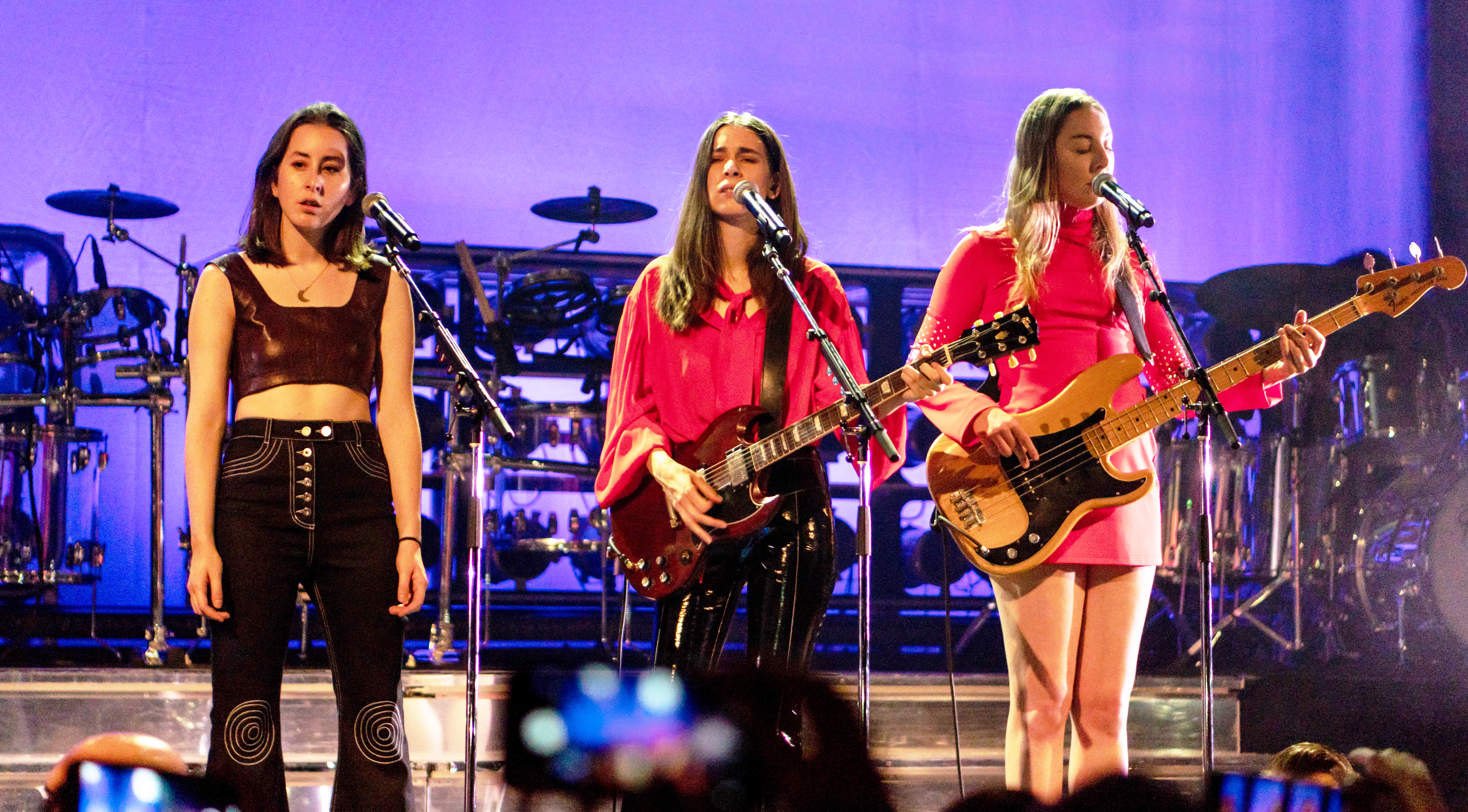
- Haim at the Fox Theater in Pomona, 2018-04-12
- Location: North America, Europe
- Associated album: Something to Tell You
- Start date: April 3, 2018
- End date: June 21, 2018
- Legs: 2
- No. of shows: 38: 23 in North America; 15 in Europe; 38 in total

Haim concert chronology
- Days Are Gone Tour (2013-14); Sister Sister Sister Tour (2018); One More Haim Tour (2022)

The Sister Sister Sister Tour is the second headlining concert tour by American band Haim, in support of their second album, Something to Tell You (2017). The tour began on April 3, 2018, in Portland, Oregon, at the Arlene Schnitzer Concert Hall. They continued throughout North America and finally concluded their 37-date tour on June 21, 2018, in Oslo, Norway at the Sentrum Scene. Opening acts for the tour included rapper Lizzo, who was present for most North American dates, as well as performers Grace Carter in Europe and Maggie Rogers on both continents.

== Set list ==
This set list is representative of the performance on June 16, 2018. It is not representative of all concerts for the duration of the tour.

1. "Falling"
2. "Don't Save Me"
3. "Little of Your Love"
4. "My Song 5"
5. "Ready For You"
6. "You Never Knew"
7. "Want You Back"
8. "Walking Away"
9. "Something To Tell You"
10. "Nothing's Wrong"
11. "Forever"
12. "The Wire"
13. "Night So Long"
14. "Found It In Silence"
15. "Right Now"

=== Notes ===
- During their June 13, 2018, and June 18, 2018, shows, Alana and Este led the sets as a result of Danielle losing her voice.
- During their April 4, 2018, May 12, 2018, and May 28, 2018, shows, Este and Lizzo covered "The Boy Is Mine" (as "The Girl is Mine") by Brandy and Monica.

== Tour dates ==
List of concerts, showing date, city, country, venue, tickets sold, number of available tickets and amount of gross revenue
Date	City	Country	Venue	Opening Acts	Attendance	Revenue
Leg 1 – North America
April 3, 2018	Portland	United States	Arlene Schnitzer Concert Hall	Lizzo	–	–
April 4, 2018	Seattle	United States	WaMu Theater	–	–	–
April 6, 2018	Berkeley	United States	Hearst Greek Theatre	Lizzo	7,527 / 8,000	$338,740
April 7, 2018	Santa Barbara	United States	Santa Barbara Bowl	Lizzo	–	–
April 11, 2018	Los Angeles	United States	Fox Theatre	N/A	1,750 / 1,750	–
April 13, 2018	Las Vegas	United States	Pearl Concert Theater	Lizzo	–	–
April 14, 2018	Indio	United States	Empire Polo Club	Lizzo	N/A	
April 19, 2018	San Diego	United States	The Observatory North Park	Lizzo	1,100 / 1,100	
April 21, 2018 (Note: This show is part of the Coachella Valley Music and Arts Festival 2018.)	Indio	United States	Empire Polo Cub	Lizzo	N/A	
April 24, 2018	Austin	United States	Stubb's	Lizzo	2,200 / 2,200	$108,900
April 25, 2018	Houston	United States	Revention Music Center	Lizzo	–	–
April 26, 2018	Dallas	United States	South Side Ballroom	Lizzo	–	–
April 28, 2018	Atlanta	United States	Coca-Cola Roxy	Lizzo	–	–
April 29, 2018	Nashville	United States	War Memorial Auditorium	Lizzo	–	–
May 1, 2018	Washington, D.C.	United States	The Anthem	Lizzo	6,000 / 6,000	$275,880
May 3, 2018	Boston	United States	Agganis Arena	Lizzo	–	–
May 4, 2018	New York City	United States	Radio City Music Hall	Lizzo	11,707 / 11,707	$601,867
May 5, 2018	New York City	United States	Radio City Music Hall	Lizzo	11,707 / 11,707	$601,867
May 7, 2018	Toronto	Canada	Massey Hall	Lizzo	–	–
May 8, 2018	Detroit	United States	The Fillmore	Lizzo	–	–
May 10, 2018	Kansas City	United States	Uptown Theater	Lizzo	–	–
May 11, 2018	Chicago	United States	Aragon Ballroom	Lizzo	7,722 / 7,722	$305,019
May 12, 2018	Chicago	United States	Aragon Ballroom	Lizzo	7,722 / 7,722	$305,019
May 14, 2018	St. Paul	United States	Palace Theatre	Lizzo	–	–
May 28, 2018	Morrison	United States	Red Rocks Amphitheatre	Maggie Rogers and Lizzo	–	–
Leg 2 – Europe
June 3, 2018	Milan	Italy	Fabrique Milano	Grace Carter	–	–
June 4, 2018	Zürich	Switzerland	X-TRA	Grace Carter	–	–
June 5, 2018	Cologne	Germany	E-Werk	Grace Carter	–	–
June 7, 2018	Warsaw	Poland	Stodola	Grace Carter	–	–
June 8, 2018	Berlin	Germany	Columbiahalle	Grace Carter	–	–
June 10, 2018	Glasgow	Scotland	O_{2} Academy Glasgow	Maggie Rogers	2,500/2,500	–
June 11, 2018	Manchester	England	O_{2} Apollo Manchester	Maggie Rogers	3,500/3,500	–
June 12, 2018	Dublin	Ireland	Olympia Theatre	Maggie Rogers	3,600/3,600	–
June 13, 2018	Dublin	Ireland	Olympia Theatre	Maggie Rogers	3,600/3,600	–
June 15, 2018	London	England	Alexandra Palace	Maggie Rogers Grace Carter	20,000/20,000	–
June 16, 2018	London	England	Alexandra Palace	Maggie Rogers Grace Carter	20,000/20,000	–
June 18, 2018	Amsterdam	Netherlands	Paradiso	Maggie Rogers	–	–
June 19, 2018	Copenhagen	Denmark	Tap1	Maggie Rogers	–	–
June 20, 2018	Stockholm	Sweden	Annexet	Maggie Rogers	–	–
June 21, 2018	Oslo	Norway	Sentrum Scene	Maggie Rogers	–	–
Total					67,606 / 68,079 (99%)	$1,630,406
