= I Quit Tour =

2025 concert tour by Haim

- Tour by Haim
- Promotional poster
- Location: North America; United Kingdom
- Associated album: I Quit
- Start date: June 27, 2025
- End date: October 31, 2025
- No. of shows: 30
- Supporting acts: Margate's Social Singing Choir; Flowerovlove; Dora Jar; Nell Mescal

Haim concert chronology
- One More Haim Tour (2022); I Quit Tour (2025); ...

The I Quit Tour was the fourth headlining concert tour by American rock band Haim, in support of their fourth studio album, I Quit (2025). It began on June 27, 2025, in Margate, England, and concluded on October 31, 2025, in Glasgow, Scotland. Margate's Social Singing Choir, British singer-songwriter Flowerovlove, American musician Dora Jar and Irish singer-songwriter Nell Mescal were featured as the opening acts for the tour.

== Tour dates ==
List of scheduled concerts, showing date, city, country, venue, and opening acts
Date (2025)	City	Country	Venue	Opening act(s)
June 27	Margate	England	Dreamland Margate	Margate's Social Singing Choir
September 4	Philadelphia	United States	TD Pavilion at the Mann	Flowerovlove
September 5	Boston	United States	The Stage at Suffolk Downs	Flowerovlove
September 6	Toronto	Canada	Scotiabank Arena	Flowerovlove
September 8	New York City	United States	Madison Square Garden	Flowerovlove
September 9	New Haven	United States	Westville Music Bowl	Flowerovlove
September 10	Columbia	United States	Merriweather Post Pavilion	Flowerovlove
September 12	Chicago	United States	United Center	Dora Jar
September 13	Milwaukee	United States	The Rave	Dora Jar
September 14	Minneapolis	United States	Minneapolis Armory	Dora Jar
September 17	Troutdale	United States	Edgefield	Dora Jar
September 18	Seattle	United States	WaMu Theater	Dora Jar
September 20	Vancouver	Canada	Thunderbird Sports Centre	Dora Jar
September 23	Mesa	United States	Mesa Amphitheatre	Dora Jar
September 25	Dallas	United States	The Bomb Factory	Dora Jar
September 26	Austin	United States	Moody Center	Dora Jar
September 28	Houston	United States	White Oak Music Hall	Dora Jar
September 30	Nashville	United States	The Pinnacle	Dora Jar
October 3	Denver	United States	Fiddler's Green Amphitheatre	Dora Jar
October 4	Great Salt Lake	United States	Saltair	Dora Jar
October 7	San Francisco	United States	Bill Graham Civic Auditorium	Dora Jar
October 9	Los Angeles	United States	Kia Forum	Dora Jar
October 10	San Diego	United States	The Rady Shell at Jacobs Park	Dora Jar
October 11	Santa Barbara	United States	Santa Barbara Bowl	Dora Jar
October 24	Nottingham	England	Motorpoint Arena	Nell Mescal
October 25	Cardiff	Wales	Utilita Arena	Nell Mescal
October 26	Brighton	England	Brighton Centre	Nell Mescal
October 28	London	England	The O2	Nell Mescal
October 30	Manchester	England	Co-op Live	Nell Mescal
October 31	Glasgow	Scotland	OVO Hydro	Nell Mescal
