= Now I'm in It =

2019 single by Haim

Single by Haim

from the album Women in Music Pt. III
- Released: October 30, 2019
- Genre: Electropop; synth-pop; pop rock
- Length: 3:24
- Label: Polydor; Columbia
- Songwriters: Danielle Haim; Este Haim; Alana Haim; Rostam Batmanglij; Ramesh Srivastava
- Producers: Ariel Rechtshaid; Danielle Haim; Rostam Batmanglij

Haim singles chronology
"Summer Girl" (2019)	"Now I'm in It" (2019)	"Hallelujah" (2019)

Music video
- "Now I'm in It" on YouTube

"Now I'm in It" is a song by American band Haim, released as a single on October 30, 2019.

== Background ==
In an interview with The Guardian, the band members talked about two upcoming songs titled "Hallelujah" and "Now I'm in It", with the latter having been announced as their next single. The song was described as a "breathy pop ballad". About the song's lyrics, Danielle revealed that "people think Now I’m in It is a break-up song because I sing: ‘We can’t be friends’ but I’m talking about me and my mind. It was gnarly and I was not OK with myself". Shortly before its release, Danielle revealed that the song was about going through a bout of depression.

== Critical reception ==
Abby Jones of Pitchfork thought that the song was a "far cry from the minimalistic groove" of their previous single "Summer Girl" and even "much of Haim's discography". She further compared the bassline to Taylor Swift's "Style". Jones concluded that "though the song does feel a little more Haimy with some organic instrumentals, a glaring awkwardness results from the otherwise electro-pop aesthetic".

== Music video ==
The music video premiered on YouTube on October 30, 2019 and was directed by long-time collaborator Paul Thomas Anderson. It primarily focuses on a day in Danielle's life and its recurring monotony. Throughout the video, the singer is seen working at a diner, getting carried on a stretcher and passing through a car wash before emerging from the fog of her depression with her sisters by her side.

== Credits and personnel ==
Credits adapted from Tidal.

Musicians

- Danielle Haim – vocals, acoustic and electric guitar, conga
- Alana Haim – vocals, conga
- Este Haim – vocals, bass
- Rostam Batmanglij – electric guitar, piano, synthesizer, drum and synthesizer programming
- Ariel Rechtshaid – synthesizer, drum and synthesizer programming
- Buddy Ross – synthesizer

Technical

- Ariel Rechtshaid – engineering
- Rostam Batmanglij – engineering
- Dalton Ricks – engineering
- John DeBold – engineering
- Manny Marroquin – mixing
- Jasmine Chen – assistant recording engineering
- Matt DiMona – assistant recording engineering
- Emily Lazar – mastering engineering
- Chris Allgood – assistant mastering engineering

== Charts ==
Weekly chart performance for "Now I'm in It"
Chart (2019)	Peak position
Hot Canadian Digital Song Sales (Billboard)	38
Belgium (Ultratip Bubbling Under Flanders)	22
Norway Radio (VG-lista)	24
New Zealand Hot Singles (RMNZ)	25
Scotland Singles (OCC)	64
Switzerland Airplay (Schweizer Hitparade)	74
UK Singles Downloads (OCC)	68
US Digital Song Sales (Billboard)	32
US Hot Rock & Alternative Songs (Billboard)	9

Annual chart rankings for "Now I'm in It"
Chart (2019)	Rank
Tokyo (Tokio Hot 100)	72

== Release history ==
Region	Date	Format	Label(s)	Ref.
Various	October 30, 2019	Digital download; streaming	Polydor; Columbia	
Australia	November 1, 2019	Contemporary hit radio	Universal	
United Kingdom	November 22, 2019	Contemporary hit radio	Polydor; Columbia	
