= Women in Music Pt. III =

Studio album by Haim
- Released: June 26, 2020
- Studios: Heavy Duty (Burbank, California); Effie Street (Los Angeles, California); Vox (Los Angeles, California); Strongroom (London, England) (Note: Except "Now I'm in It", recorded at Echo Park Backhouse (Los Angeles), Heavy Duty, Vox, Effie Street, Ulvhälls Herrgård (Strängnäs, Sweden), and Matsor Projects (Los Angeles))
- Genre: Soft rock
- Length: 41:40
- Label: Columbia
- Producers: Danielle Haim; Rostam Batmanglij; Ariel Rechtshaid

Haim chronology
Something to Tell You (2017)	Women in Music Pt. III (2020)	I Quit (2025)

Singles from Women in Music Pt. III
- 1. "Summer Girl" Released: July 31, 2019; 2. "Now I'm in It" Released: October 30, 2019; 3. "Hallelujah" Released: November 18, 2019; 4. "The Steps" Released: March 3, 2020; 5. "I Know Alone" Released: April 29, 2020; 6. "Don't Wanna" Released: May 21, 2020

Women in Music Pt. III is the third studio album by American rock band Haim. It was released on June 26, 2020, in the United States by Columbia Records and internationally by Polydor Records. The album was originally set for release on April 24, 2020, but was delayed due to the effects of the COVID-19 pandemic and "the changing nature of travel policies and quarantines across the world." The release was later moved to June 26. It was produced by Danielle Haim, Rostam Batmanglij and Ariel Rechtshaid, and was preceded by the singles "Summer Girl", "Now I'm in It" and "Hallelujah". The song "The Steps" was released alongside the album pre-order.

Before its official announcement, Women in Music Pt. III was named one of the most anticipated albums of 2020 by several outlets, including Pitchfork and Vulture. The album received widespread critical acclaim, with critics praising its honest and vulnerable lyrics and its experimentation with a wide range of genres, while also paying homage to several other artists. It was nominated for Album of the Year at the 63rd Grammy Awards, while "The Steps" was nominated for Best Rock Performance.

== Background and composition ==
The trio initially teased the album with the abbreviation WIMPIII on their social media, jokingly offering a "free T-shirt" to anybody who could guess what it stood for or who had an answer that made them laugh.

After touring in support of their previous album, Something to Tell You (2017), the band experienced various personal struggles, including unprocessed grief from the death of Alana's best friend in a car accident in 2012, Este's struggles with type 1 diabetes, and Danielle's depression as well as her partner Ariel Rechtshaid's cancer diagnosis. They channeled these experiences into their music, with "an unflinching honesty" and "intimately familiar with depression in all its states". True to the album's title, many songs discuss the misogyny the band faces in the music industry; for example "Man from the Magazine" is a tongue-in-cheek Joni Mitchell–esque song about the casually sexist questions asked of them by journalists.

The album cover was shot at Canter's Deli in Los Angeles by Paul Thomas Anderson, who also directed the music videos for all three singles and "The Steps", as well as for later directing the 2021 film Licorice Pizza which starred Alana.

Women in Music Pt. III is a primarily soft rock album that features elements of folk-pop, hip hop, reggae, lo-fi, heartland rock, dance, country rock, UK garage, electropop, free jazz, funk, 1990s R&B, as well as 1970s and 1980s pop. Danielle Haim cited Outkast's Speakerboxxx/The Love Below (2003) as a key source of influence for the band that inspired the eclectic nature of their album. She explained, "We thought it would be cool to make a body of work that didn't adhere to specific rules or genre, like they did."

== Release ==
The album's first single, "Summer Girl", preceded the album by several months, becoming the first of three (at the time) standalone singles released that same year, along with "Now I'm in It" and "Hallelujah", with a music video for each release, all directed by frequent collaborator Paul Thomas Anderson.

Interesting, the vinyl pressing LP is meant to be played at 45 rpm, historically used only for singles (45's).

Used in this way, it creates higher quality audio reproduction due to the faster rotation, which can allow for more information to be etched into the grooves of the vinyl.

== Critical reception ==
Professional ratings
Aggregate scores
Source	Rating
AnyDecentMusic?	8.2/10
Metacritic	89/100
Review scores
Source	Rating
AllMusic	5/5 stars
And It Don't Stop	A−
The Daily Telegraph	5/5 stars
The Guardian	5/5 stars
The Independent	5/5 stars
NME	5/5 stars
The Observer	4/5 stars
Pitchfork	8.6/10
Rolling Stone	4/5 stars
Slant Magazine	4/5 stars

Women in Music Pt. III was met with universal acclaim from critics. At Metacritic, which assigns a weighted average rating out of 100 to reviews from mainstream publications, this release received an average score of 89, based on 23 reviews. The album was a New York Times Critic's Pick and was featured on Pitchfork's Best New Music.

Many critics noted the trio's use of new sounds and exploration of new genres on the album. Writing for Pitchfork, Aimee Cliff called it "Haim as we haven't quite heard them before: not just eminently proficient musicians, entertainers, and 'women in music,' but full of flaws and contradictions, becoming something much greater." Cliff wrote that the album "eschew[s] Haim's usual summery rock to find the right genre for the mood", sometimes mixing multiple genres within the same track. Lindsay Zoladz, writing for The New York Times, remarked that the record "clears a welcome path forward for the group's sound," cautioning that "every so often they overstuff the arrangements with one too many sonic quirks or spoken-word bridges, but more often than not their risks are rewarding." Reviewing in his "Consumer Guide" column, Robert Christgau applauded Batmanglij for enhancing the band's compositions, in which, "from booty calls to dreams so much sweeter than what anyone wakes up to in this cruel time, the lyrics evoke the pains and complexities of the single life each of these seamless siblings is obliged to face alone after all."

In July 2020, the album was included on Entertainment Weekly and Slant Magazine's list of the best albums of 2020 so far.

== Accolades ==
On November 24, 2020, the album was nominated for Album of the Year at the 63rd Annual Grammy Awards, marking the band's first nomination in that category. The single "The Steps" was also nominated for Best Rock Performance, marking the group's first nomination in that category as well.

Accolades for Women in Music Pt. III
Publication	Accolade	Rank	Ref.
Exclaim!	Exclaim!'s 50 Best Albums of 2020	6	
The Guardian	The 50 Best Albums of 2020	7	
NPR	The 50 Best Albums of 2020	11	
Pitchfork	The 50 Best Albums of 2020	8	
Pitchfork	The 35 Best Rock Albums of 2020	—	
Rolling Stone	The 50 Best Albums of 2020	14	
Stereogum	The 50 Best Albums of 2020	4	
Under the Radar	Top 100 Albums of 2020	3	

== Commercial performance ==
Women in Music Pt. III entered at number one on the UK Albums Chart, selling 17,762 copies in its opening week. The album became the band's second number one album in the UK after their debut album Days Are Gone in 2013. In Ireland, the album entered and peaked at number five in the album charts, becoming their third top five album in the country.

In Australia, the album entered at number seven on the album charts, becoming their third top 10 album. In the United States, Women in Music Pt. III debuted and peaked at number 13 on the US Billboard 200, making the album the group's third top 20 record.

== Track listing ==
All tracks are produced by Danielle Haim, Rostam Batmanglij and Ariel Rechtshaid, except where noted.

Women in Music Pt. III track listing
No.	Title	Writer(s)	Length
1.	"Los Angeles"	Danielle Haim; Este Haim; Alana Haim; Rostam Batmanglij; Ariel Rechtshaid	3:20
2.	"The Steps" (additional production by Dave Fridmann)	D. Haim; E. Haim; A. Haim; Batmanglij; Rechtshaid	4:07
3.	"I Know Alone"	D. Haim; E. Haim; A. Haim; Batmanglij; Rechtshaid; Buddy Ross	3:46
4.	"Up from a Dream"	D. Haim; E. Haim; A. Haim; Batmanglij; Rechtshaid	3:17
5.	"Gasoline"	D. Haim; E. Haim; A. Haim; Batmanglij	3:13
6.	"3 AM"	D. Haim; E. Haim; A. Haim; Tommy King; Batmanglij; Rechtshaid	3:10
7.	"Don't Wanna"	D. Haim; E. Haim; A. Haim; Batmanglij	3:21
8.	"Another Try"	D. Haim; E. Haim; A. Haim; Batmanglij; Rechtshaid	3:25
9.	"Leaning on You"	D. Haim; E. Haim; A. Haim; Batmanglij	3:21
10.	"I've Been Down"	D. Haim; E. Haim; A. Haim; Batmanglij	2:51
11.	"Man from the Magazine"	D. Haim; E. Haim; A. Haim	2:06
12.	"All That Ever Mattered"	D. Haim; E. Haim; A. Haim; Batmanglij; Rechtshaid	2:30
13.	"FUBT"	D. Haim; E. Haim; A. Haim; Batmanglij; Tayla Parks	3:13
Total length:			41:40

Bonus tracks
No.	Title	Writer(s)	Length
14.	"Now I'm in It"	D. Haim; E. Haim; A. Haim; Batmanglij; Ramesh Srivastava; Rechtshaid	3:24
15.	"Hallelujah"	D. Haim; E. Haim; A. Haim; Tobias Jesso Jr.	3:10
16.	"Summer Girl"	D. Haim; E. Haim; A. Haim; Batmanglij; Rechtshaid; Lou Reed	3:25
Total length:			51:39

Bonus tracks (vinyl version)
No.	Title	Writer(s)	Length
14.	"Summer Girl" (video version)	D. Haim; E. Haim; A. Haim; Batmanglij; Rechtshaid; Reed	3:52
15.	"Now I'm in It" (video version)	D. Haim; E. Haim; A. Haim; Batmanglij; Srivastava; Rechtshaid	3:56
16.	"Hallelujah"	D. Haim; E. Haim; A. Haim; Jesso	3:10
Total length:			52:38

Expanded edition
No.	Title	Writer(s)	Length
14.	"Gasoline" (featuring Taylor Swift)	D. Haim; E. Haim; A. Haim; Batmanglij	3:13
15.	"3 AM" (featuring Thundercat)	D. Haim; E. Haim; A. Haim; King; Batmanglij; Rechtshaid	3:10
16.	"Now I'm in It"	D. Haim; E. Haim; A. Haim; Batmanglij; Srivastava; Rechtshaid	3:24
17.	"Hallelujah"	D. Haim; E. Haim; A. Haim; Jesso	3:10
18.	"Summer Girl"	D. Haim; E. Haim; A. Haim; Batmanglij; Rechtshaid; Reed	3:25
Total length:			58:02

Notes

- "Summer Girl" contains a portion of the song "Walk on the Wild Side", written by Lou Reed.

== Personnel ==
All track numbers refer to the digital, CD and cassette releases of the album.

Haim

- Danielle Haim – vocals (all tracks), electric guitar (1, 3–6, 10, 12, 14, 15), drums (1–5, 7–10, 12, 16), guitar (2, 7), drum programming (3, 6, 12), congas (8, 10, 14), acoustic guitar (9, 11, 14), synthesizer (12), lead guitar (13), bass programming (16)
- Este Haim – bass (1, 2, 4–12, 14), vocals (1–10, 12–16), upright bass (16)
- Alana Haim – organ (1), piano (1), bass (1), vocals (1–10, 12–16), acoustic guitar (2, 9, 11), shaker (2), electric guitar (4–6, 8, 10, 12), guitar (7, 16), lead guitar (13), congas (14)

Additional musicians

- Rostam Batmanglij – electric guitar (1, 2, 4, 5, 7, 8, 10, 12, 14), organ (1, 7, 10, 16), piano (1, 4, 10, 14), horn arrangement (1, 8, 10), 12-string guitar (2, 9), synthesizer (3, 4, 8, 13, 14, 16), side-chained bass (3), acoustic guitar (4–7, 9–11, 16), vocals (4, 6, 7, 9, 10), bass (5), Mellotron (5), accordion (5), CS-80 (5), drum programming (7, 8, 12–14, 16), mandolin (7), double bass (9), Orchestron (9), rhythm guitar (13), synth programming (14), string arrangement (15), shaker (16), slide guitar (16), saxophone arrangement (16)
- Cass McCombs – electric guitar (2, 4)
- Ariel Rechtshaid – synthesizer (2–4, 6, 7, 12, 14), bass (2, 4, 11), organ (2, 4), drum programming (3–6, 12–14), electric guitar (3, 12), acoustic guitar (3), vocals (3, 4, 6, 14), flange guitar (5), turntables (6), harmonium (9), hand drums (9), horn arrangement (10), synth programming (14), electric guitar drones (15), tambourine (16), additional drums (16), CDJ (16)
- Buddy Ross – organ (2), synth and drum programming (3), synthesizer (8, 14)
- Benji Lysaght – acoustic guitar (2), electric guitar (6)
- Philip Peterson – cello (3)
- Joe Thornally – spoken word (6)
- Tommy King – Chamberlin (6), harpsichord (6), synthesizer (6), piano (8), Juno (8), Mellotron (8), Yamaha PS-30 (8), Moog (8)
- JJ Kirkpatrick – trumpet (8)
- Julian Maclanahan – mandolin (9), violin (15)
- Henry Solomon – saxophone (1, 10, 16)
- Amir Yagmai – electric guitar (12)
- Jim-E Stack – drum programming (13)
- Jack Hallenbeck – synthesizer (13)
- Rob Moose – violin (15), viola (15), string arrangement (15)
- Tobias Jesso Jr. – acoustic guitar (15)

Engineers

- Ariel Rechtshaid – engineering (all tracks), mixing (6, 8, 10–13, 16)
- Rostam Batmanglij – engineering (all tracks), mixing (6, 8, 10–13, 16)
- John DeBold – engineering (all tracks)
- Joey Messina Doerning – engineering (1–13)
- Tristan Friebderg Rodman – engineering (1, 9, 15)
- Matt DiMona – engineering (1–10, 12), assistance (14–16)
- Jasmine Chen – engineering (1–7, 10), assistance (14–16)
- Chris Kasych – engineering (2, 6, 8, 16)
- Dave Schiffman – engineering (4, 5)
- Dalton Ricks – engineering (4, 14, 16)
- Michael Harris – engineering (15, 16)
- Grace Banks – engineering (15, 16)
- Nate Head – engineering (16)
- Dave Fridmann – mixing (1, 4, 9)
- Tom Elmhirst – mixing (2, 3, 5, 7, 15)
- Manny Marroquin – mixing (14)
- Shawn Everett – mixing (12,16)
- Chris Galland – mix engineering (14)
- Robin Florent – mix assistance (14)
- Scott Desmarais – mix assistance (14)
- Jeremie Inhaber – mix assistance (14)
- Matt Scatchell – mix assistance (2, 3, 5, 7, 15)
- Emily Lazar – mastering
- Chris Allgood – mastering assistance

Artwork

- Paul Thomas Anderson – photography, art direction
- Erica Frauman – photography, art direction
- Florencia Martin – photography, art direction
- Sergie Loobkoff – photography, art direction
- Maria Paula Marulanda – design
- Marek Polewski – design

== Charts ==
=== Weekly charts ===
Chart performance for Women in Music Pt. III
Chart (2020)	Peak position
Australian Albums (ARIA)	7
Austrian Albums (Ö3 Austria)	25
Belgian Albums (Ultratop Flanders)	20
Canadian Albums (Billboard)	37
Dutch Albums (Album Top 100)	41
French Albums (SNEP)	187
German Albums (Offizielle Top 100)	27
Irish Albums (Official Charts)	5
Japanese Albums (Oricon)	90
Japanese Download Albums (Billboard Japan)	52
New Zealand Albums (RMNZ)	37
Norwegian Albums (VG-lista)	33
Portuguese Albums (AFP)	30
Scottish Albums (Official Charts)	2
Spanish Albums (PROMUSICAE)	59
Swedish Albums (Sverigetopplistan)	55
Swiss Albums (Schweizer Hitparade)	11
UK Albums (Official Charts)	1
US Billboard 200	13
US Top Alternative Albums (Billboard)	1
US Top Rock Albums (Billboard)	1

=== Year-end charts ===
Year-end chart performance for Women in Music, Pt. III
Chart (2020)	Position
US Top Current Album Sales	137
US Top Rock Albums	99

== Certifications ==
Certifications for Women in Music, Pt. III
Region	Certification	Certified units/sales
United Kingdom (BPI)	Gold	100,000^{‡}
^{‡} Sales+streaming figures based on certification alone.
