= Haim (band) =

American pop rock band

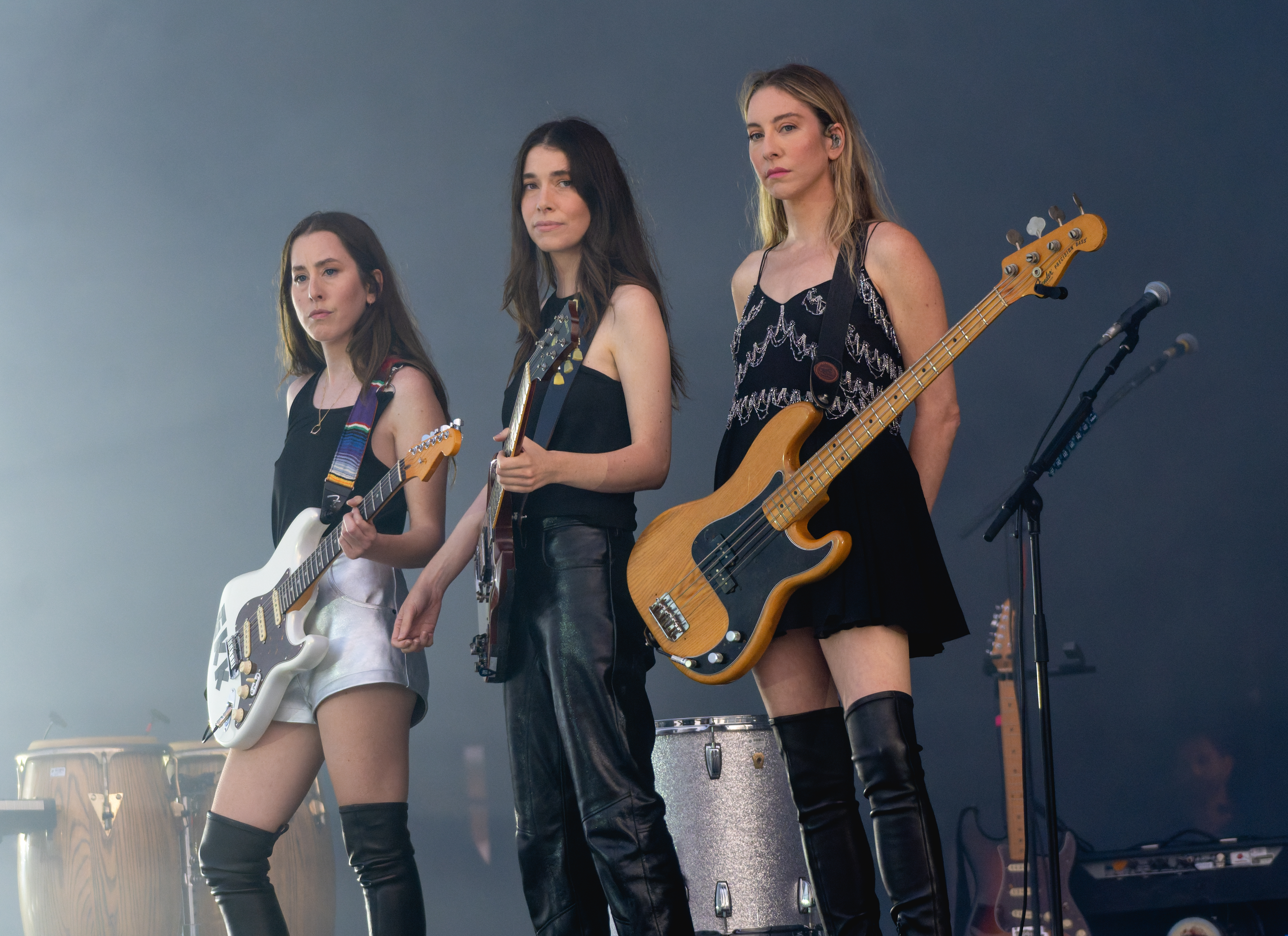
- Haim performing in June 2025; From left to right: Alana, Danielle, Este Haim

Background information
- Origin: Los Angeles, California, U.S.
- Genres: Rock; soft rock; pop rock; R&B
- Years active: 2007–present
- Labels: Roc Nation; Polydor; Columbia
- Members: Alana Haim; Danielle Haim; Este Haim
- Website: haimofficial.com

Haim (/ˈhaɪ.ɪm/ HY-im; stylized in all caps as HAIM) is an American rock band, based in Los Angeles, composed of three sisters, Este (bass guitar and vocals), Danielle (lead vocals, guitar, and drums), and Alana Haim (guitars, keyboards, and vocals).

The sisters grew up in a musical family, and began playing instruments from an early age in the cover band Rockinhaim, fronted by their parents, Moti and Donna. The two elder sisters, Este and Danielle, performed briefly with the pop group Valli Girls in 2005, releasing a few songs on soundtrack and compilation albums under that name. In 2007, they formed Haim with younger sister Alana, but did not seriously consider it a professional career for some years. After Danielle became a successful touring guitarist, first with Jenny Lewis and later with Julian Casablancas, Haim reformed as a full-time operation in 2012.

The group's first release, Forever (an EP released as a limited-time download), combined with positive reception at the South by Southwest festival, led to a deal with Polydor Records, and a management deal with Jay-Z's Roc Nation group in mid-2012. The band began recording material for their first album, Days Are Gone (2013), in sessions between touring dates, including appearances at the Glastonbury Festival. The album charted in the top ten in several countries, including the number-one spot in the UK, and the group had won several "best of" awards by the end of 2013. The group was nominated for Best New Artist at the 57th Annual Grammy Awards. Their second album, Something to Tell You, was released in July 2017. Their third album, titled Women in Music Pt. III, was released in June 2020. The group received nominations at the 63rd Annual Grammy Awards for Album of the Year (for Women in Music Pt. III) and Best Rock Performance (for "The Steps"). The group's fourth studio album, I Quit, was released on June 20, 2025 to favorable reviews.

== Early life ==
The three sisters, Este Arielle (born March 14, 1986), Danielle Sari (born February 16, 1989) and Alana Mychal (born December 15, 1991) were all born and raised in the San Fernando Valley, California, U.S., to Jewish parents. Their father Mordechai "Moti" Haim and their mother Donna were both musical; though he had been a professional soccer player in Israel, Moti also played drums, while Donna won a contest on The Gong Show in the 1970s singing a Bonnie Raitt song. Their father's maternal Jewish family is originally from Bulgaria.

While Danielle showed an aptitude for the guitar at a young age, Moti made the decision that Este would be more suited to the bass, buying her a second-hand Fender for $50. The siblings were encouraged to listen to their parents' 1970s classic rock and Americana records and, during their childhood, the family formed a band called Rockinhaim to play cover versions at local charity fairs, with Moti on drums and Donna on guitar. In 2000, the group performed their first rock concert at Los Angeles' Canter's Deli. They played typical wedding band material, including the Beatles' "Get Back", Billy Joel's "You May Be Right" and Van Morrison's "Brown Eyed Girl", but did only free community and benefit gigs at churches, schools and hospitals.

== Career ==
=== Early career ===
In 2004, Danielle and Este were invited to join the Valli Girls, an all-female pop rock group signed to Columbia Records. They recorded a few one-off songs, and later appeared on the soundtrack to the 2005 film The Sisterhood of the Traveling Pants. The group made an appearance at the 2005 Nickelodeon Kids' Choice Awards, and their song "Valli Nation" was included in the companion soundtrack. Danielle and Este left the group shortly afterwards. As they grew older, the sisters became more interested in incorporating pop and contemporary R&B into their music, and in 2007 they decided to form their own band. For their first gig, the trio played at a Jewish deli in Hollywood and were paid in matzah ball soup. Early gigs were sparsely populated; Danielle recalled, "We were [at the] bottom of the bill at 50-capacity venues and no one would show up". For the next five years, Haim played local venues but did not consider music as a professional career, because all three sisters were busy with other projects. Este was studying at UCLA and graduated in 2010 with a degree in ethnomusicology, specializing in Bulgarian and Brazilian music. Alana attended Los Angeles County High School for the Arts and graduated in 2010.

After graduating from high school, Danielle was spotted by musician Jenny Lewis at a jam session in Laurel Canyon, which led to Danielle joining Lewis's touring band. The Strokes' lead vocalist Julian Casablancas came to see one of Lewis's shows on tour, and he in turn asked Danielle to play guitar and percussion on his solo tour. Danielle rehearsed with Casablancas' band every day for two months, which she later described as "an eye-opening experience." Following working with Casablancas from late 2009 to mid 2010, she auditioned for a place in Scarlet Fever, the all-female backing band for CeeLo Green. Danielle performed only once with the group, on The Tonight Show with Jay Leno. While Danielle enjoyed touring, she decided she would prefer to perform her own music alongside her sisters, turning down a lucrative tour deal with Green. Casablancas advised Danielle to write stronger material and focus on recording, as it would improve their online presence.

=== 2012–2014: Forever and Days Are Gone ===
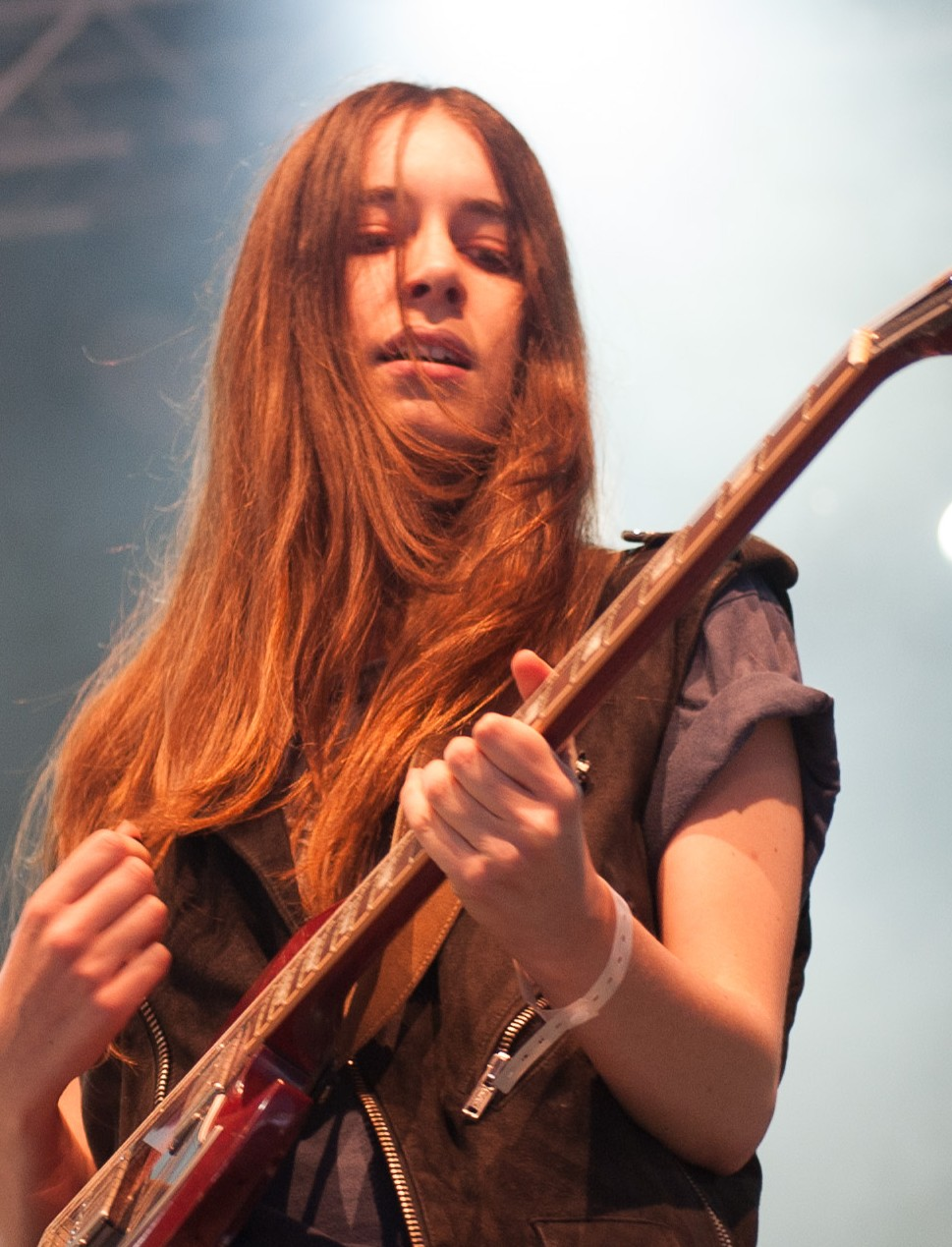
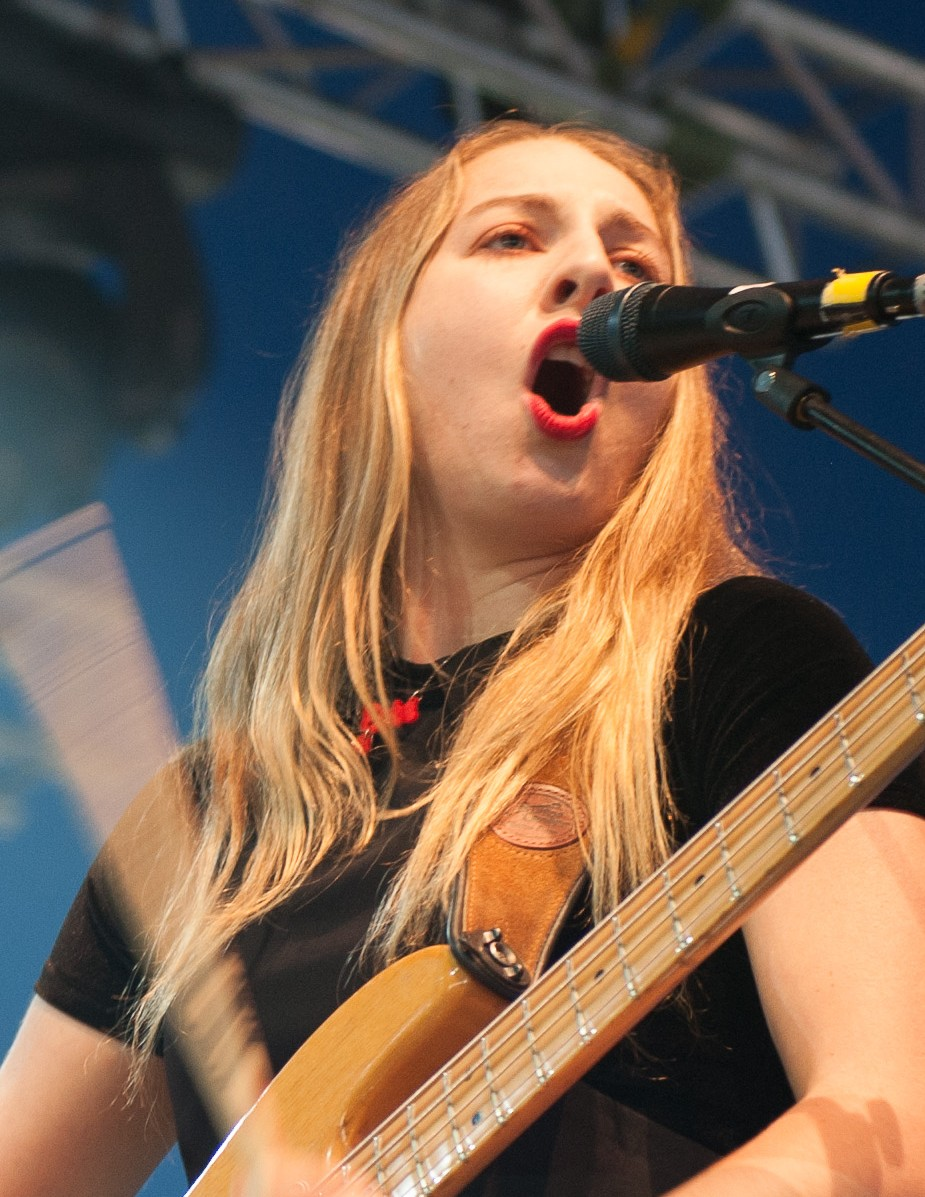
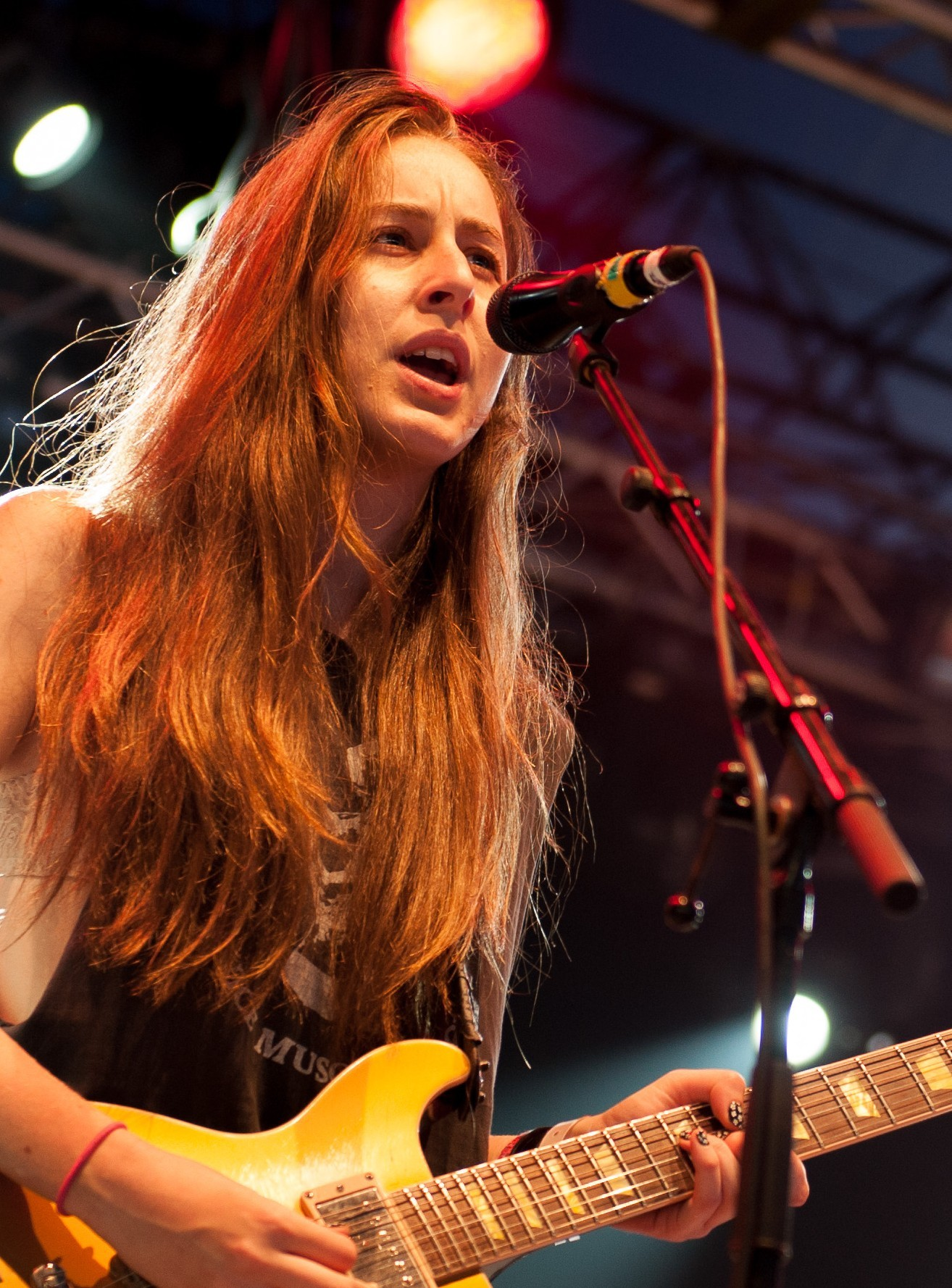
Danielle (left), Este (middle) and Alana Haim at Way Out West 2013 in Gothenburg, Sweden

After playing shows supporting Edward Sharpe and the Magnetic Zeros, the Henry Clay People and Kesha, Haim released the EP Forever, which included three songs, in February 2012 as a time-limited free download on their website. Dash Hutton officially joined as drummer at the EP's release party at the Los Angeles Bootleg Theatre. He is the son of Three Dog Night's Danny Hutton and knew Este socially after she had seen his old band, Wires on Fire. The EP received attention from the music industry following a successful series of shows at the South by Southwest festival in March. Danielle recalled the first show was "maybe a disaster", but the remainder of the shows attracted more attention. The band subsequently signed a deal with Polydor Records in the UK in June.

In July, independent record label National Anthem re-released the Forever EP on 10" vinyl, containing the original three songs along with a fourth track, a remix of "Forever" by Dan Lissvik. Following dates supporting Mumford & Sons on their Gentlemen of the Road tour in the US in August, Haim toured the UK for the first time in November 2012 and then supported Florence and the Machine on their UK and Ireland tour in December.

British music magazine NME made the title track of the Forever EP its No. 4 track of 2012. On January 4, 2013, the BBC announced that Haim had topped their annual Sound of 2013 music industry poll to find the most promising new musical acts for the coming year. The group also signed a management contract with the conglomerate Roc Nation, returned to South by SouthWest in March 2013 and earned their own "At Your Request" video feature on Idolator. In early 2013, they were featured on American recording artist Kid Cudi's third studio album Indicud, on the song titled "Red Eye". Danielle Haim appeared on the first track, "You're No Good", from Major Lazer's second album, Free the Universe, alongside Santigold, Vybz Kartel and Yasmin.

The group spent a year recording their first album, Days Are Gone, in sessions between live shows. The group experimented with drum machines and the music program GarageBand, adding hip hop and R&B influences to their existing sound. Polydor recommended producers Ariel Rechtshaid and James Ford to help with the album, and they suggested further use of synthesizers, bringing the album closer to a straightforward pop style. Several of the drum tracks were recorded with gated reverb, made famous by Phil Collins. In June 2013, the group performed at Glastonbury Festival, and in addition to their own set, the band appeared with Primal Scream performing backing vocals on "It's Alright, It's OK", "Rocks" and "Come Together." The band later returned for a repeat performance at Glastonbury in 2014. During their set in 2013, Este, who was diagnosed with Type 1 diabetes in 2000, nearly had a diabetic seizure after taking insulin and forgetting to eat after. After going backstage, she returned, albeit sitting for the rest of their set.

The single "The Wire" was released on July 29 and the album followed on September 30. The album reached number one in the UK and has since sold 200,000 copies there. To promote the album, the group performed "The Wire" on the BBC's The Andrew Marr Show, with Este dedicating the song to the then-British Prime Minister David Cameron, also a guest on the show. The move was criticised as being ill-judged by musician Johnny Marr of the Smiths, who stated that "It's really simple: they made themselves look like idiots. It's ridiculous. No-one put a gun to their head. The Conservatives tried to do the same thing with the Smiths, to re-appropriate us in a false way, to be cool by association.” Haim did not respond.

Haim subsequently toured Europe throughout the remainder of 2013, recruiting touring keyboardist Tommy King, as well as performing as the musical guest on Saturday Night Live on November 23 with host Josh Hutcherson. The group performed "The Wire" and "Don't Save Me", and Este considered this performance particularly poignant as a high school drama teacher had once told her, "You're never going to be on Saturday Night Live." The main US tour followed in April 2014 and continued into May. In 2014, the sisters recorded backing vocals with the supergroup the New Basement Tapes for their album Lost on the River, performing on the tracks "Kansas City" and "The Whistle Is Blowing".

=== 2014–2018: Touring and Something to Tell You ===
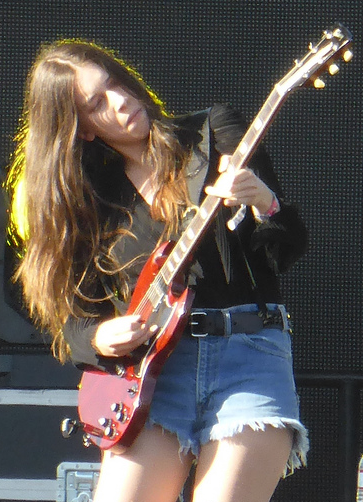
Danielle Haim performing in Indio, California, April 2014

In 2014, Haim was awarded the NME "Best International Band" award. In August, the band released the video for "My Song 5" in a remixed version, featuring American rapper, ASAP Ferg. This is the sixth single taken from Days Are Gone. Haim and Jon Heder made an appearance for the music video of Chromeo's "Old 45's". In October, the group recorded a cover of Fleetwood Mac's "Rhiannon" with Stevie Nicks. They continued to record their second album, having written a bulk of new material while on tour over the year. The band is also featured on the original soundtrack of The Hunger Games: Mockingjay – Part 1 and The Divergent Series: Insurgent. In November, the group contributed their vocals to the track "Pray to God" on Calvin Harris' fourth studio album Motion.

The group has become friends with singer-songwriter Taylor Swift, and together they have visited Catalina and Maui, Hawaii. In the summer of 2015, Haim opened for Taylor Swift at select dates on The 1989 World Tour. The group was nominated for Best New Artist at the 57th Annual Grammy Awards. Danielle was injured in an accident just before the awards, but shortly afterwards tweeted that she was recovering.

In March 2016, Haim released a teaser announcing new music and a new tour for that summer. In an interview with NME on January 18, 2017, Haim announced their second album would be released that summer. In April, a teaser video shot by Paul Thomas Anderson was released of a new song, "Right Now" from their second album, Something to Tell You, released on July 7. Its lead single, "Want You Back", was released on May 3. The band followed up the release with various promotional appearances, including a return appearance on Saturday Night Live, where they performed "Want You Back" and "Little of Your Love". Hutton left the band in 2017 to focus on his own projects. In early 2018, Haim announced the Sister Sister Sister Tour for the United States, Europe and the United Kingdom.

=== 2018–2022: Women in Music, Pt. III ===
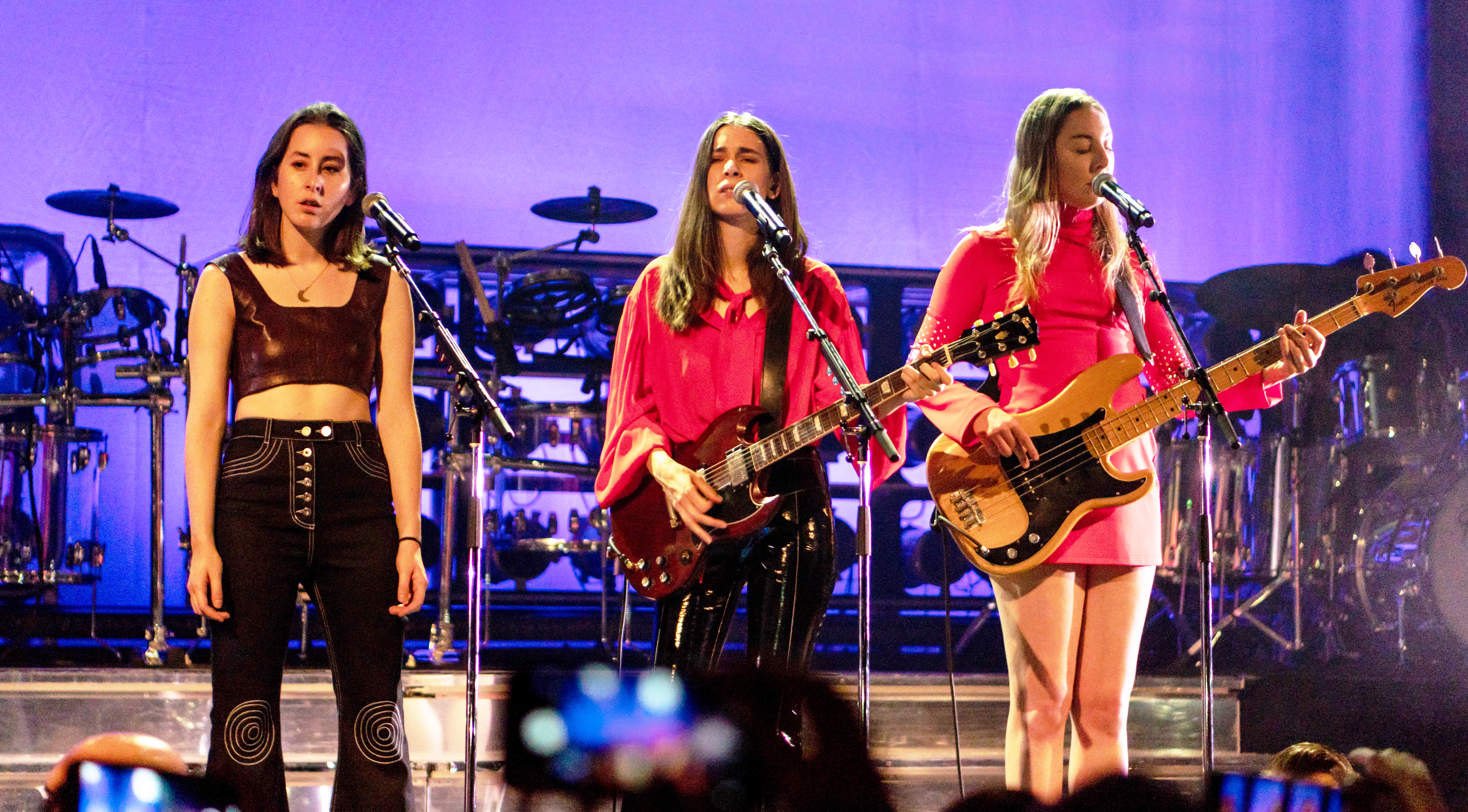
Haim performing in April 2018

On November 11, 2018, the group performed at Vetsaid 2018, within a lineup alongside Ringo Starr, James Taylor and Don Henley of the Eagles. On March 6, 2019, the band announced they were headlining the 14th annual Pitchfork Music Festival in Chicago alongside headliners Robyn and the Isley Brothers. On April 4, 2019, Danielle announced via the band's social media pages that the band had been recording new music and were preparing for a summer 2019 release. Danielle contributed extensively to Father of the Bride, the fourth studio album by Vampire Weekend, as well as providing drums on several songs on Immunity by Clairo. In July 2019, they released the song "Summer Girl", which was inspired by producer and Danielle's partner Ariel Rechtshaid's fight with cancer. They stated shortly afterwards that more music would be released in the coming months with the single "Now I'm in It" being released on October 30. Haim also released another new single, "Hallelujah", on November 18.

On February 27, 2020, the Haim sisters appeared in Thundercat's music video for "Dragonball Durag". On March 2, 2020, the band shared a release date of April 24 for their third album, Women in Music Pt. III, with promotional single "The Steps" to be released March 2. On March 23, the band announced their intentions to delay the release of the album until June 26, due to the coronavirus outbreak. On May 22, they released another single "Don't Wanna", produced by Rostam, Rechtshaid, and Danielle. Women in Music Pt. III received acclaim from critics and the band announced the One More Haim Tour for the UK on July 31. In August 2020, it was reported that Alana had been cast in the comedy drama film Licorice Pizza, which started filming that month, with Este and Danielle also appearing in small supporting roles. In December 2020, it was announced the group would be featured on the track "No Body, No Crime" from Taylor Swift's ninth studio album Evermore; the song became the second single of the album on January 11, 2021. On February 18, 2021, Haim released a remix of their song "Gasoline", featuring Swift, along with an expanded version of Women in Music Pt. III. The expanded version also included a remix of "3 AM" featuring Thundercat.

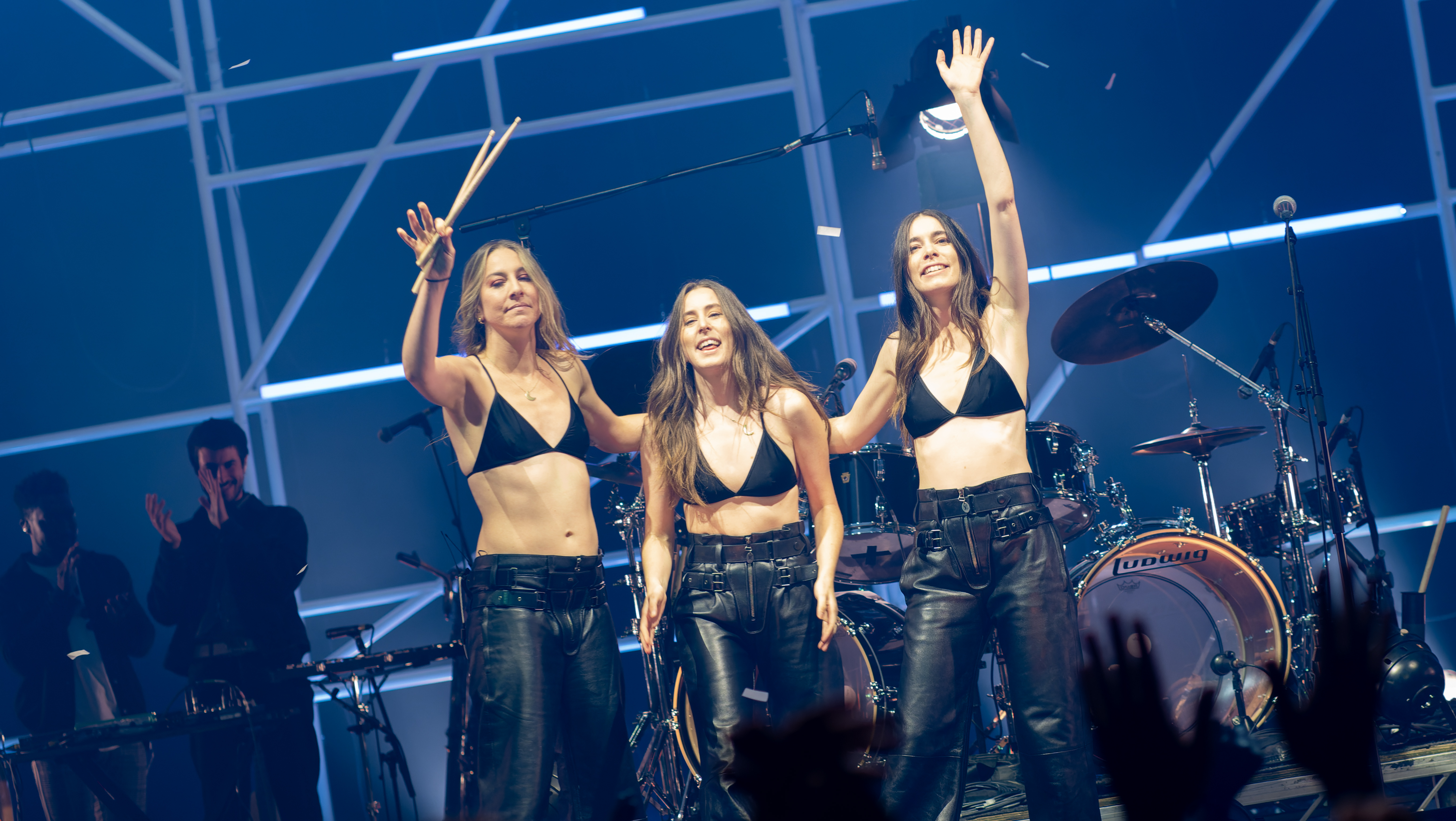
Haim in London, England, in July 2022

Haim was nominated in two categories at the 63rd Annual Grammy Awards in 2021, including for Album of the Year (Women in Music Pt. III), making them the first all-female rock band to hold the distinction, along with a Best Rock Performance nomination for "The Steps". The band signed with Netflix to produce the soundtrack for an upcoming animated feature film, The Witch Boy. The band appeared in the music video of Swift's song "Bejeweled", released on October 25, 2022.

=== 2023–present: I Quit ===
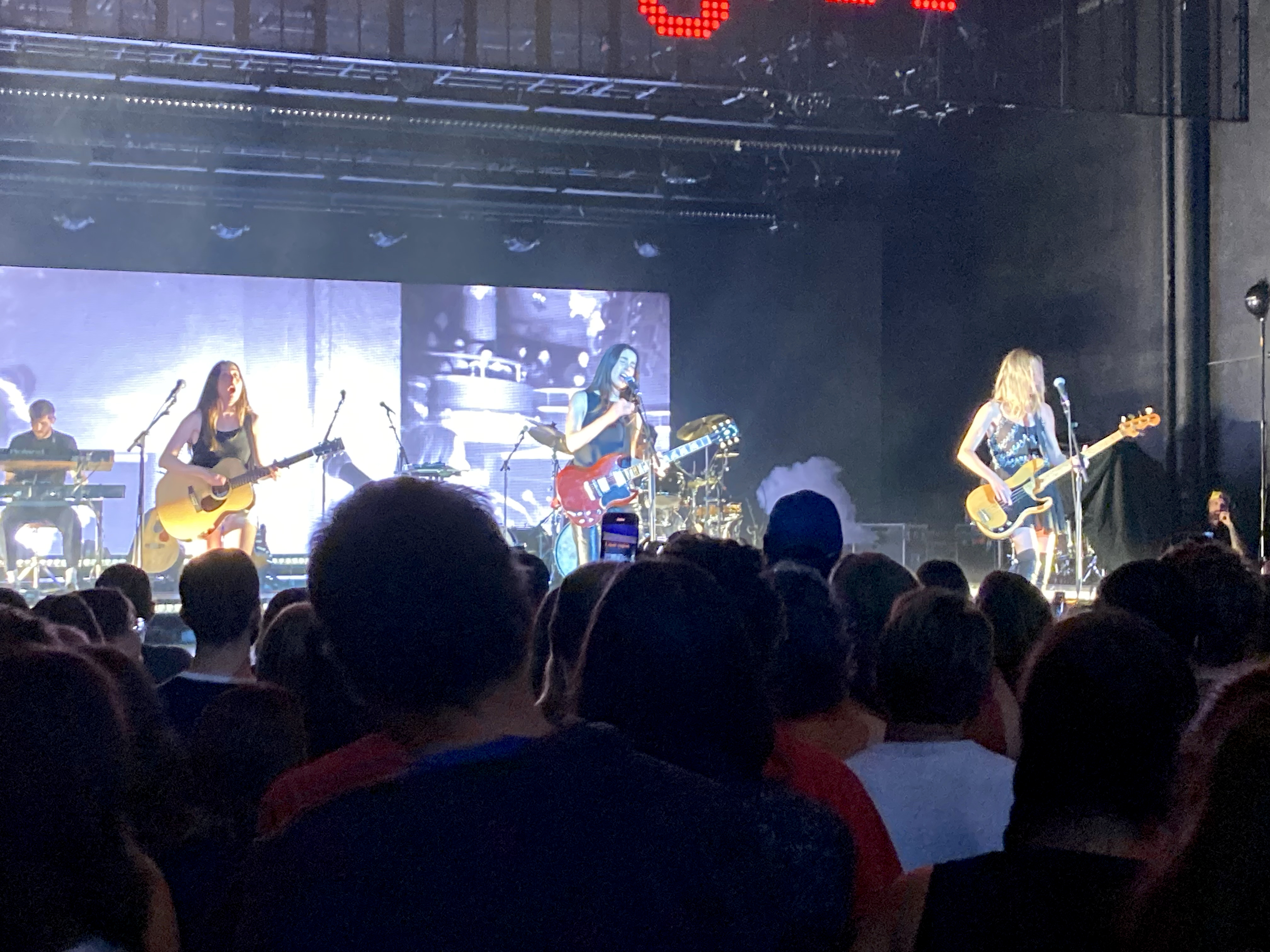
Haim in Milwaukee, Wisconsin, in September 2025

On January 16, 2023, in a video posted to TikTok, Haim announced that they were back in the studio working on their fourth album. The band was an opening act on multiple shows of the US leg of Swift's The Eras Tour in 2023, later performing their song "No Body, No Crime" with Swift during the headline slot alongside their opening set (marking its live debut). On July 21, 2023, the band released their single "Home", featuring on the soundtrack for the Barbie movie.

On March 5, 2025, Haim announced the release of their new single "Relationships". On March 12, the track was released along with its music video, which was directed by Camille Summers-Valli and features American actor Drew Starkey. On April 4, the band released the second single from their fourth studio album, "Everybody’s Trying To Figure Me Out", co-written with Rostam Batmanglij and Justin Vernon. On April 24 and May 30, two more singles were released: "Down to Be Wrong" and "Take Me Back". The former came out with a music video starring American actor Logan Lerman. The group's fourth album, I Quit, was released on June 20, 2025. The same day, the music video for its fifth single, "All Over Me", featuring Will Poulter, Archie Madekwe, and Nabhaan Rizwan, was released. Haim also released a deluxe version of the album on October 17, 2025, which included three new songs, "Tie You Down" featuring Bon Iver, "The Story of Us, and "Even the Bad Times."

== Artistry ==
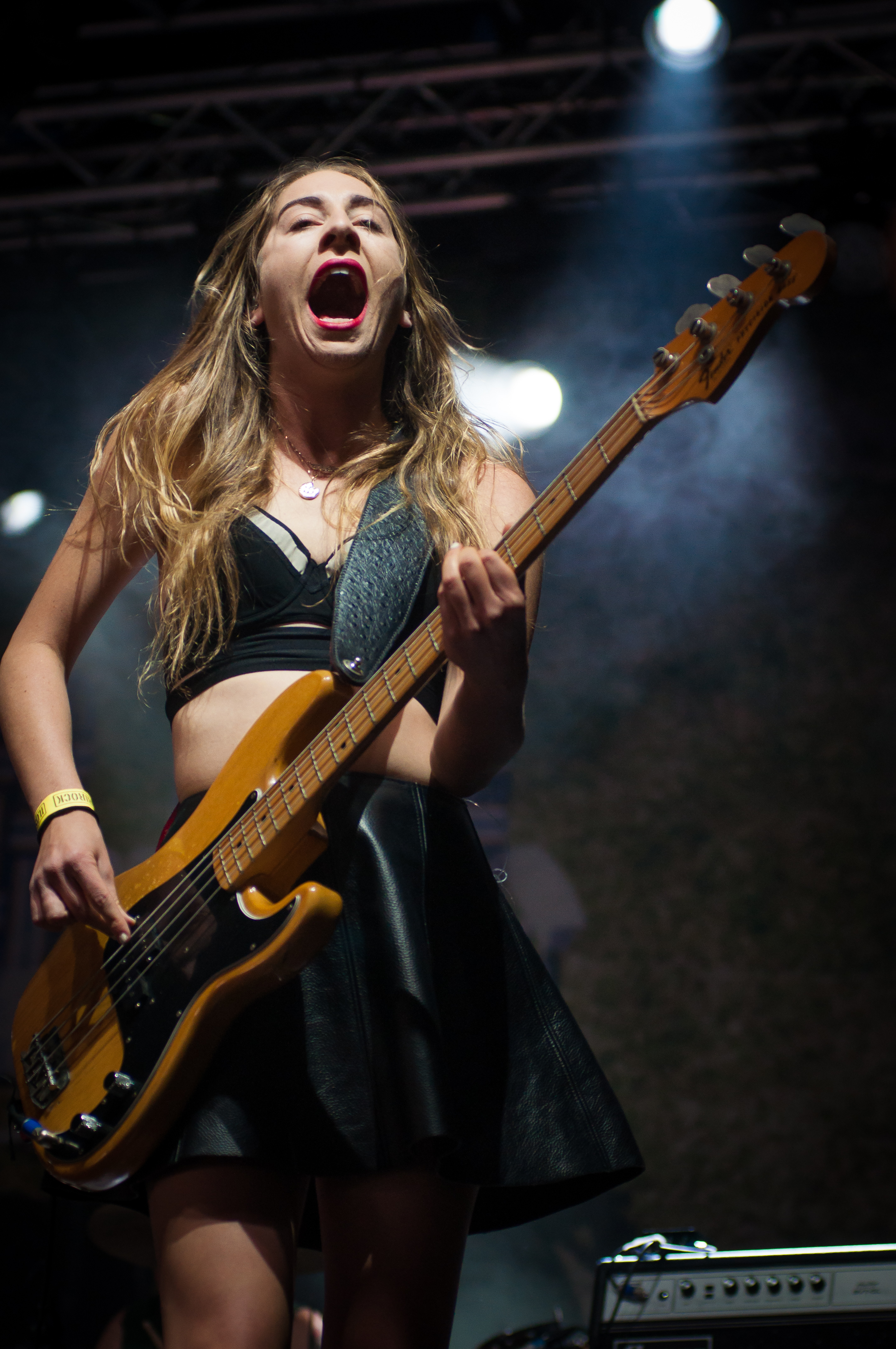
Este Haim performing in Joensuu, Finland, July 2014

Haim's music has generally been categorized as soft rock and pop rock, with significant influences of R&B. Critics have frequently compared their sound to Fleetwood Mac, which the group has acknowledged as an influence, though they are "squeamish" about the comparison. The band has also cited Joni Mitchell, Prince, Aaliyah, TLC, Destiny's Child and Spice Girls as influences.

The group has rejected the "girl band" label, preferring to be respected as musicians on their individual merits. Alana stated, "When people call us a girl band, I take it as an insult – being a girl in a band shouldn't be a thing." All three sisters are proficient on more than one instrument: Este plays both guitar and bass, Danielle plays guitar and drums, and Alana plays guitar, keyboards and percussion. For live performances, Este plays bass, Danielle plays lead guitar and sings lead vocals, and Alana plays rhythm guitar along with keyboards and percussion. All three sisters contribute three part vocal harmony. As the lead singer, Danielle's contralto vocals have been described as "rich" and "earthy". Elaina Crockett of The Daily Orange has described all three members as altos, observing that they rarely sing beyond this range.

The band's live sound differs from that in the studio. Writing for NME, Hazel Sheffield said that Days Are Gone "may confuse those won over by their raw, rocking live shows." Recordings demonstrate the group's vocal pop style, while the group plays typical rock material such as Fleetwood Mac's "Oh Well" in concert. The group's background in wedding bands from their days as Rockinhaim has led them to cover many different songs live and for radio sessions, including Miley Cyrus' "Wrecking Ball", Sheryl Crow's "Strong Enough" and the Strokes' "I'll Try Anything Once" (an early version of "You Only Live Once"). Este acts as the group's MC onstage, announcing most of the songs. Many of her on-stage antics, such as her blunt and coarse banter with the audience, frequent illeism and her facial expressions (known as the "bass face") while playing, are staples of the band's live shows and, to a lesser extent, the band's public image.

Haim is also recognized for their music videos, which frequently follow the band members in long takes as they casually stride through various Los Angeles locations. Dance critic Gia Kourles has described this style of movement as a form of postmodern dance, and has observed that Este had childhood aspirations of being a professional dancer. Additionally, Margaret Talbot has noted the irony of this motif, given that Los Angeles is known for being "the city where, cliché has it, nobody walks". Alana has said of the trend, "We always find it so funny that our fans are like, 'They’re so great at walking.' It’s such an easy thing to do." The band members have cited their fondness for learning choreography, as well as their parents' decision to instill a love of dance when they were children, as factors behind the prevalence of movement in their videos.

== Critical reception ==
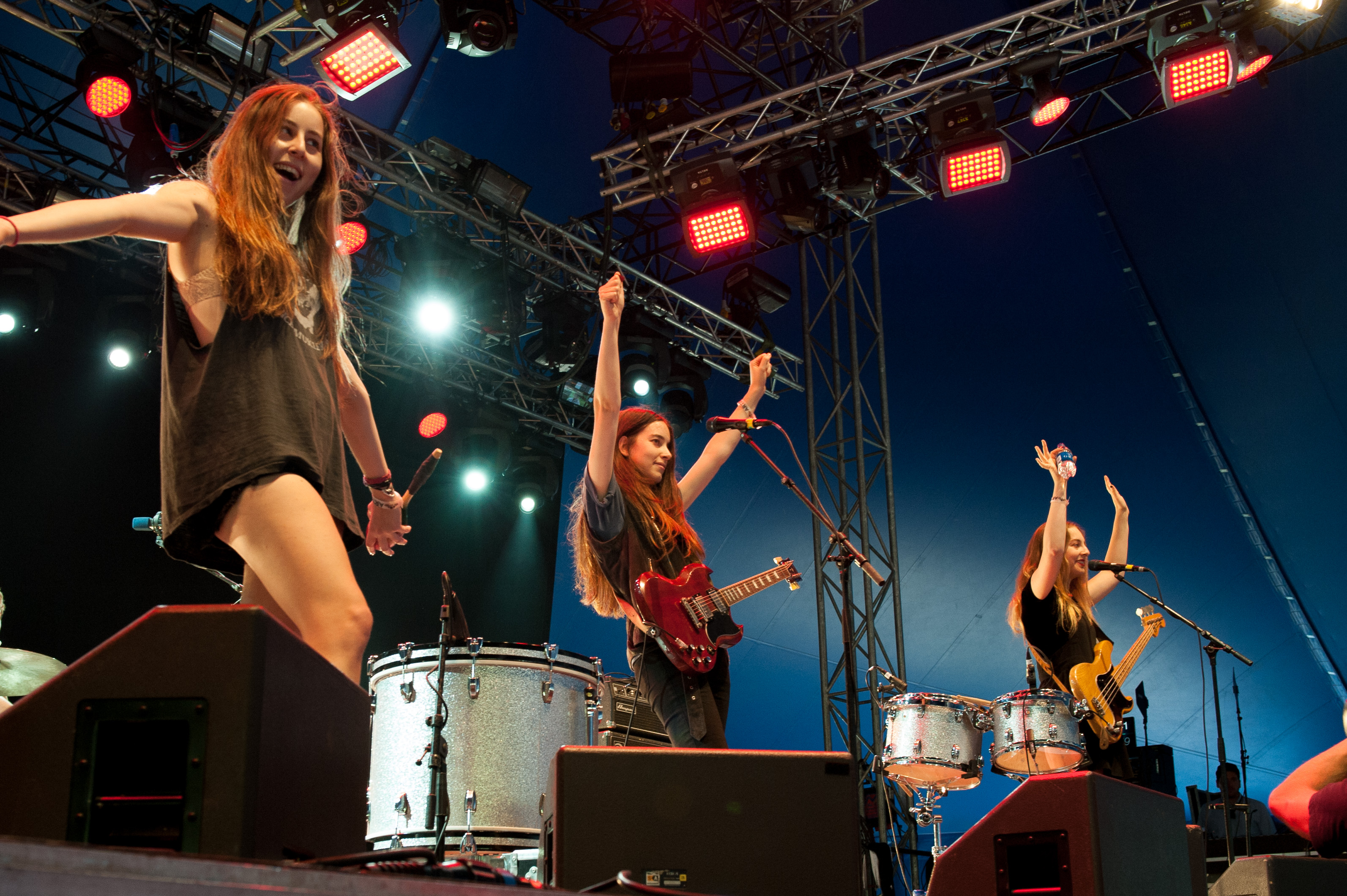
Haim performing at the Way Out West in 2013

Critical reaction to Haim has mostly been positive. PopMatters' Matt James wrote "It'd be hard to truly dislike Haim. They're an eminently likeable, albeit slightly kooky, trio whose story already bears the frisson of legend." Writing for The Guardian, Alexis Petridis praised the band's songwriting abilities, saying it "has a certain kind of glossily depthless pop perfection down pat". The band's sound has been described as "nu-folk-meets-nineties-R&B" and "music that sounds like it was written on a lakeside retreat attended by Stevie Nicks, John Waite and En Vogue".

In her survey of pop music in 2013, Observer critic Kitty Empire praised the band for "using the vector of harmonies to splice R&B with 1970s soft rock. They laid waste, too, to a herd of ghastly old hobby horses about guitar bands being unmarketable and record sales only being tied to women's state of undress." In 2013, The Independent was more ambivalent about the band, saying there was "an insubstantiality at their core" of their music, as they "plug unashamedly" into the heritage of acts such as Fleetwood Mac and the Bangles, ultimately finding Haim as "Okay, but not much more".

After the release of Women in Music Pt. III, critical reception continued to improve. Pitchfork praised the "evolution" of the band, calling its songwriting "more nuanced, more self-aware, and frequently darker than ever before" and explaining that the album demonstrated Haim being "eminently proficient musicians, entertainers, and 'women in music,' but full of flaws and contradictions, becoming something much greater." The magazine awarded the album an 8.6 rating. The Independent called the album "fearless" and "effervescent" and gave it five stars, noting that the band had left behind their trademark "sunny, classic-rock-indebted sound" for "a dark road."

== Band members ==
Haim live at Rock im Park 2014

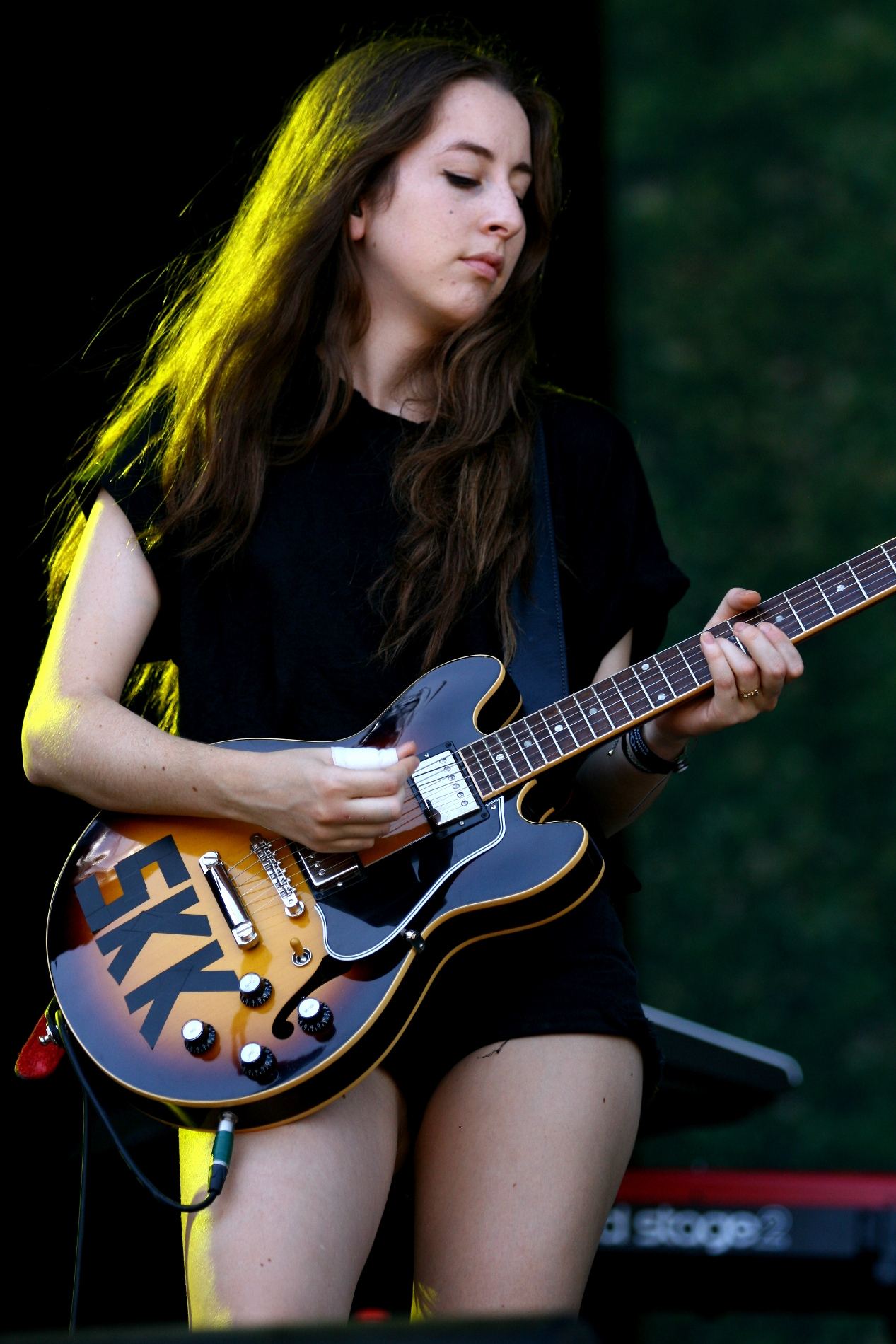
Alana Haim

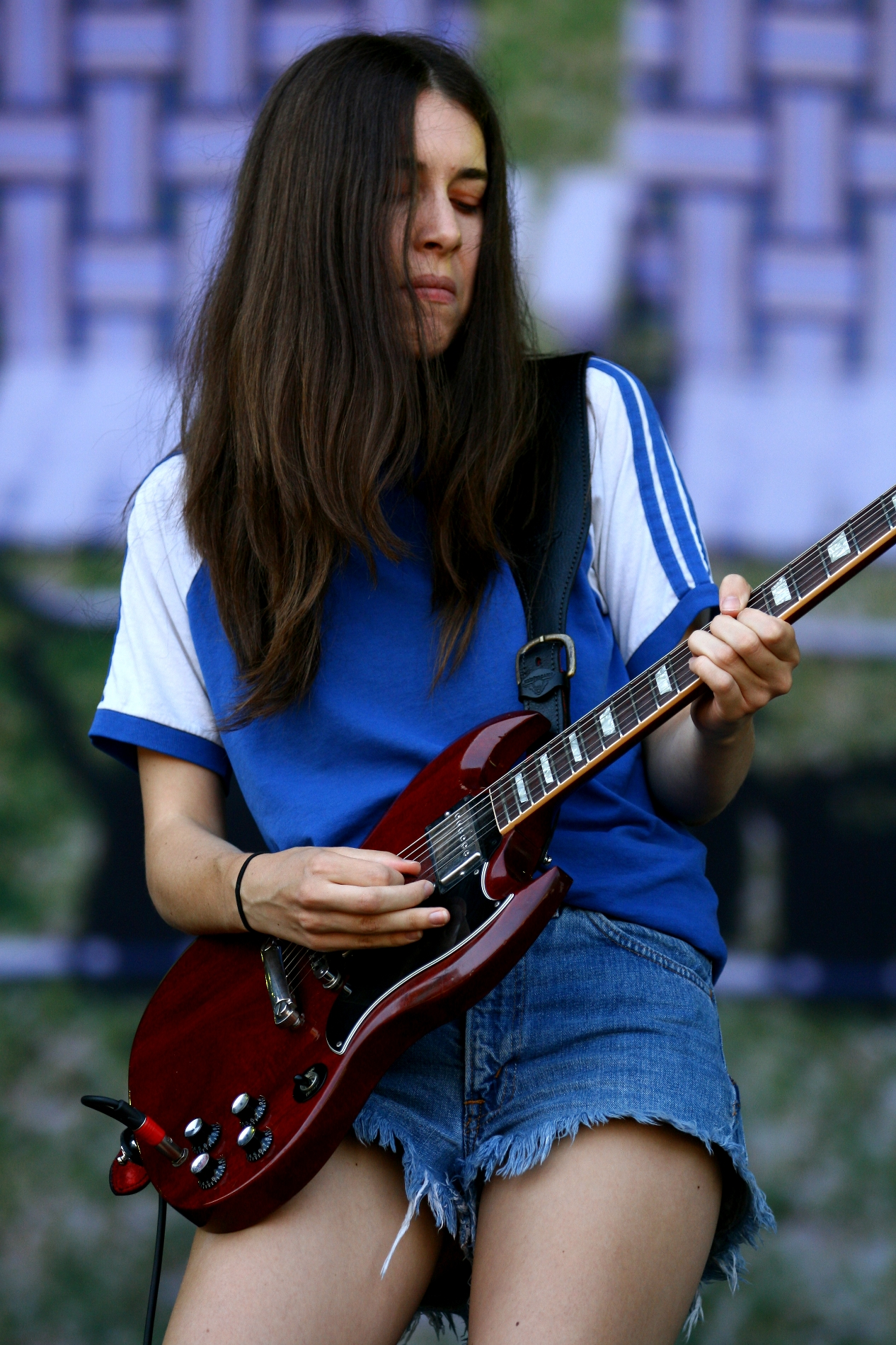
Danielle Haim

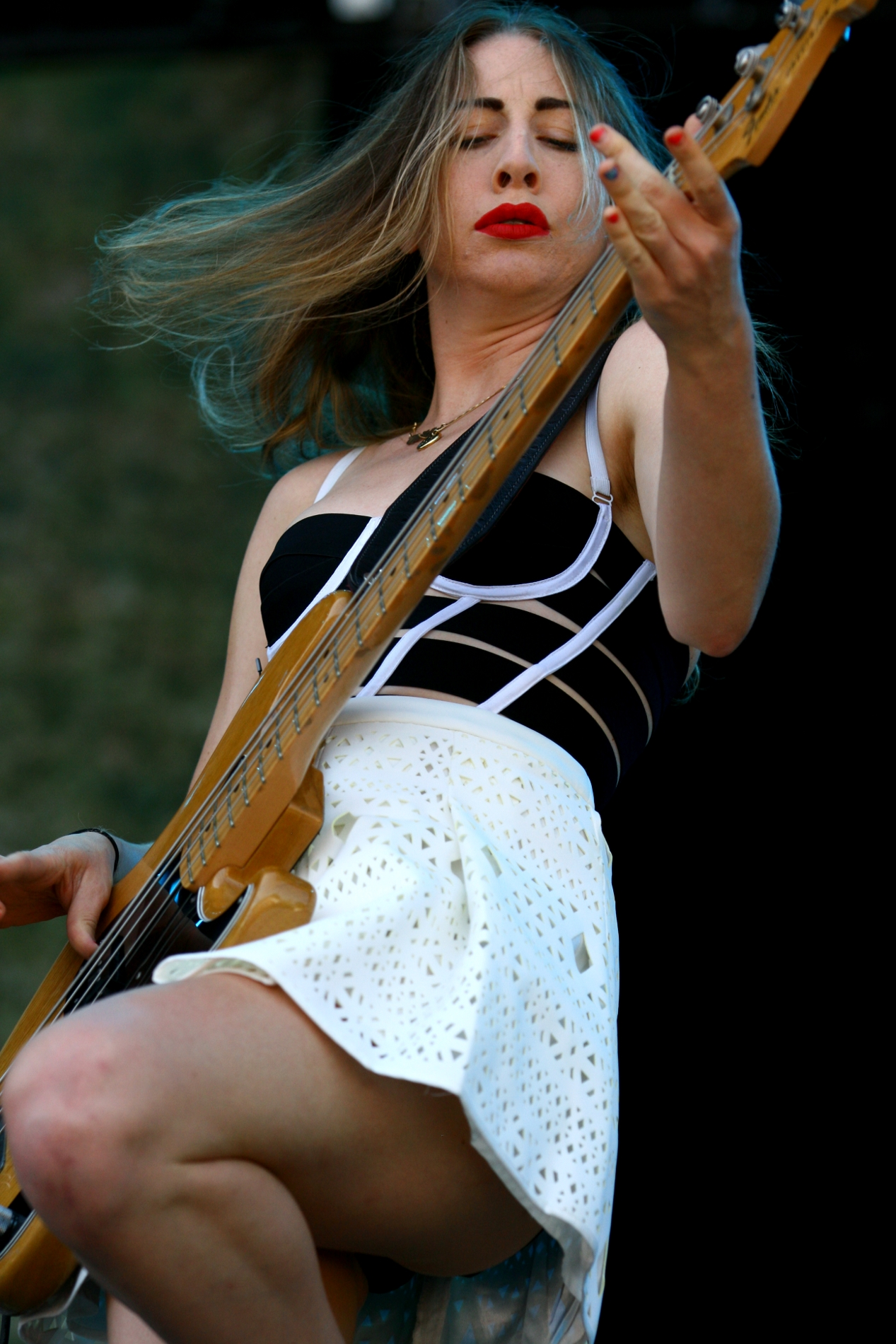
Este Haim

Current members

- Alana Haim – vocals, guitar, keyboards, synthesizer, piano, percussion (2007–present)
- Danielle Haim – vocals, guitar, drums, percussion (2007–present)
- Este Haim – vocals, bass guitar, percussion (2007–present)

Current touring member

- Jody Giachello – drums, percussion (2017–present)

Former touring member

- Dash Hutton – drums, percussion (2012–2017)

== Discography ==
- Days Are Gone (2013)
- Something to Tell You (2017)
- Women in Music Pt. III (2020)
- I Quit (2025)

== Tours ==
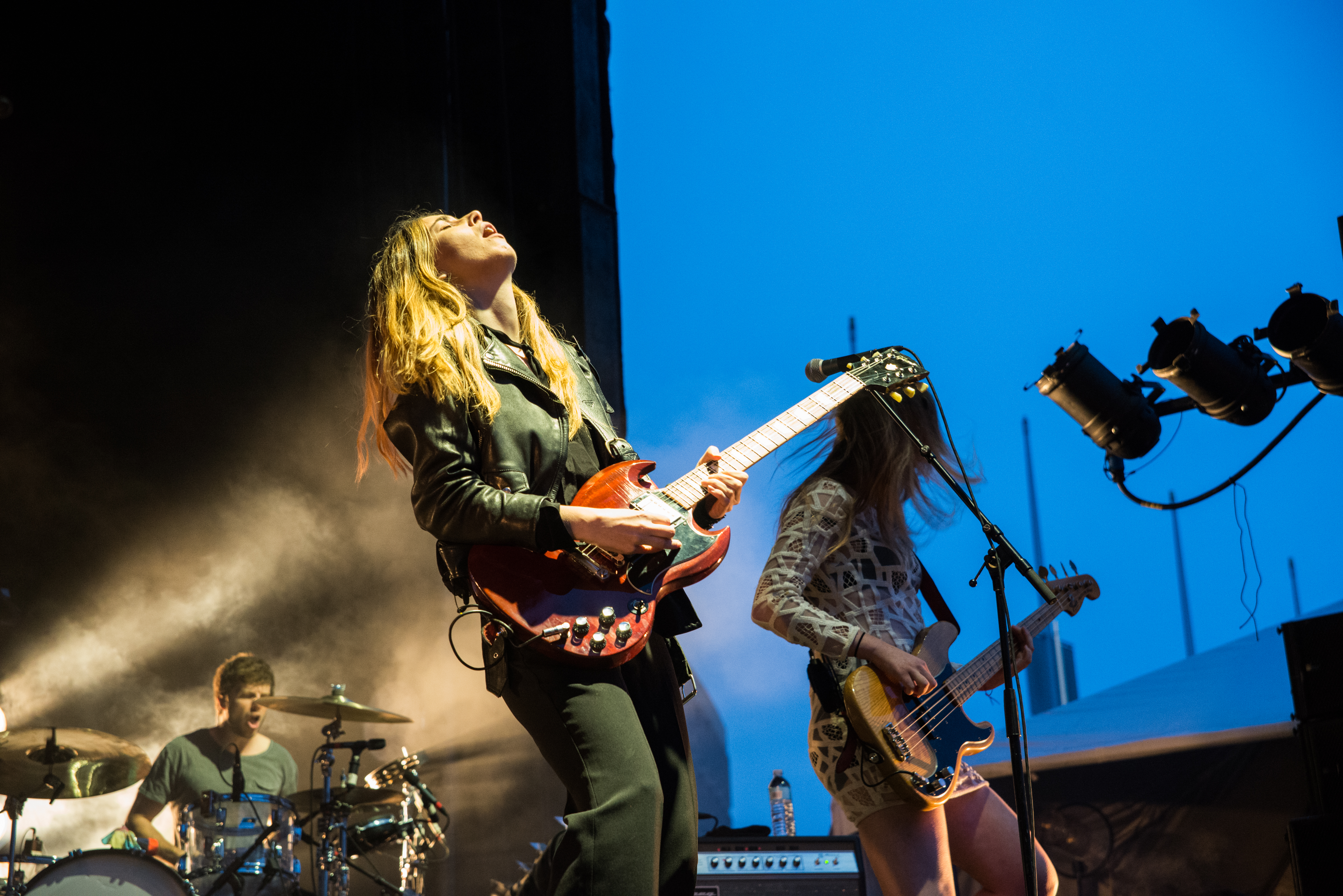
Haim performing at Boston Calling in 2016

=== Headlining ===
- Days Are Gone Tour (2013–2014)
- Sister Sister Sister Tour (2018)
- One More Haim Tour (2022)
- I Quit Tour (2025)

=== Opening act ===
- Julian Casablancas – Phrazes for the Young Tour (2010)
- The xx – Coexist Tour (2012)
- Twin Shadow – Confess Tour (2012)
- Florence and the Machine – Ceremonials Tour (2012)
- Mumford & Sons – Gentlemen of the Road Tour (2012–2013)
- Vampire Weekend – Modern Vampires Tour (2013)
- Of Monsters and Men – My Head Is an Animal Tour (2013)
- The Killers – Battle Born World Tour (2013)
- Rihanna – Diamonds World Tour (2013)
- Phoenix – Bankrupt! Tour (2013–2014)
- Kings of Leon – Mechanical Bull Tour (2014)
- Taylor Swift – The 1989 World Tour (2015)
- Red Hot Chili Peppers – 2022 Global Stadium Tour (2022)
- Taylor Swift — The Eras Tour (2023)
