= Haim discography =

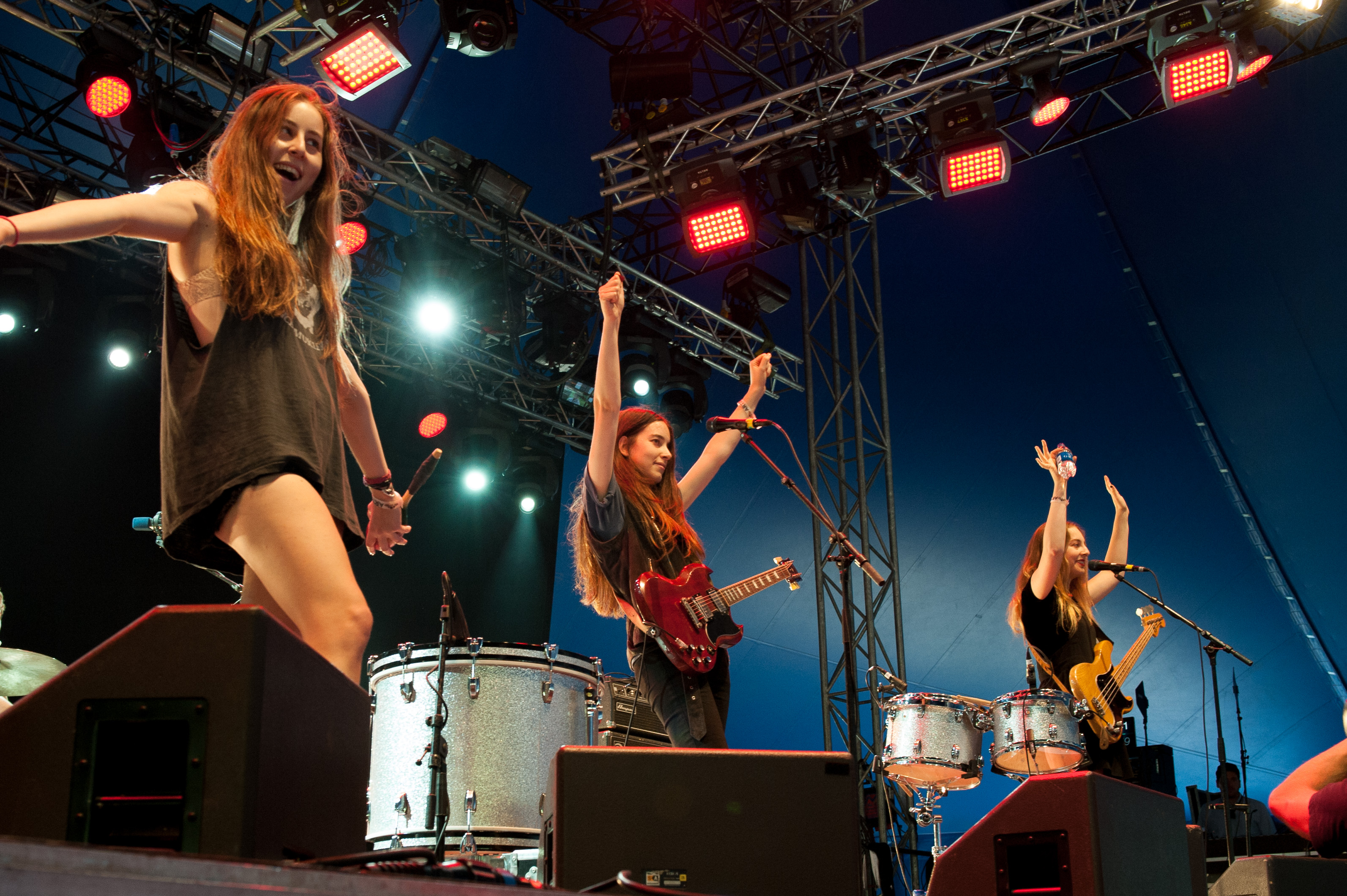
- Haim at the Way Out West Festival, Gothenburg, Sweden in 2013. L to R: Alana, Danielle, Este Haim
- Studio albums: 4
- EPs: 6
- Singles: 21
- Music videos: 18
- Promotional singles: 6

American pop rock band Haim has released four studio albums, six extended plays, 21 singles (plus 5 as a featured artist), six promotional singles, and 18 music videos. The band, which consists of three sisters Este, Danielle and Alana Haim, and drummer Dash Hutton, began performing together in 2007 and became a full-time band in 2012. The group's first release, Forever (an EP released on a limited-time download), combined with positive reception at the South by Southwest festival, led to a deal with Polydor Records and a management deal with Jay Z's Roc Nation group in mid-2012.

Haim released their debut studio album, Days Are Gone, in September 2013. The album reached number one on the UK Albums Chart and has since sold over 300,244 copies in the United Kingdom. The band has released six singles from the album: "Forever", "Don't Save Me", "Falling", "The Wire", "If I Could Change Your Mind", "My Song 5", with "The Wire" reaching number 16 on the UK Singles Chart.

== Studio albums ==
List of studio albums, with selected chart positions and certifications shown
Title	Details	Peak chart positions										Sales	Certifications
Title	Details	US	AUS	BEL (Fl)	CAN	GER	IRE	NLD	NZ	SWI	UK	Sales	Certifications
Days Are Gone	Release: September 27, 2013; Label: Polydor; Formats: CD, LP, digital download	6	2	9	7	30	4	32	12	35	1	UK: 300,244	ARIA: Platinum; BPI: Platinum; RIAA: Gold
Something to Tell You	Released: July 7, 2017; Label: Columbia; Formats: CD, LP, digital download	7	4	17	11	44	4	46	11	26	2	US: 26,000	BPI: Silver
Women in Music Pt. III	Released: June 26, 2020; Label: Columbia; Formats: CD, LP, digital download	13	7	20	37	27	5	41	37	11	1		BPI: Gold
I Quit	Released: June 20, 2025; Label: Columbia; Formats: CD, LP, digital download	25	20	20	—	19	36	48	15	37	3		
"—" denotes an album that did not chart or was not released in that territory.

== Extended plays ==
List of extended plays, with selected chart positions shown
Title	Details	Peak chart positions
Title	Details	US Dance
Forever	Released: July 2, 2012 (Note: Forever was originally released on February 10, 2012 as a free download from the band's website.); Label: National Anthem, Neon Gold; Formats: 10", digital download	1
iTunes Festival: London 2012	Released: November 7, 2012; Label: Columbia; Formats: Digital download	—
Spotify Sessions	Released: June 18, 2013; Label: Columbia; Formats: Streaming	—
iTunes Festival: London 2013	Released: October 15, 2013; Label: Columbia; Formats: Digital download	—
Spotify Singles	Released: June 18, 2017; Label: Columbia; Formats: Streaming	—
Relationships EP	Released: April 18, 2026; Label: Columbia; Formats: 12” vinyl (Record Store Day)	—

== Singles ==
=== As lead artist ===
List of singles as lead artist, with year released and album shown
Title	Year	Peak chart positions										Certifications	Album
Title	Year	US Rock	AUS	BEL (Fl)	EST	FRA	IRE	JPN	NZ	SWI	UK	Certifications	Album
"Forever"	2012	24	—	— (Note: "Forever" did not enter the Flanders Ultratop 50, but peaked at number 27 on the Ultratip chart.)	—	148	—	49	—	—	75	BPI: Silver	Days Are Gone
"Don't Save Me"	2012	—	66	28	—	—	70	—	—	61	32	ARIA: Gold; BPI: Silver	Days Are Gone
"Falling"	2013	45	86	— (Note: "Falling" did not enter the Flanders Ultratop 50, but peaked at number 20 on the Ultratip chart.)	—	—	61	—	—	—	30	BPI: Silver	Days Are Gone
"The Wire"	2013	25	12	— (Note: "The Wire" did not enter the Flanders Ultratop 50, but peaked at number 6 on the Ultratip chart.)	—	—	26	56	17	87	16	ARIA: Platinum; BPI: Gold; MC: Gold; RMNZ: Platinum; RIAA: Platinum	Days Are Gone
"If I Could Change Your Mind"	2014	42	90	— (Note: "If I Could Change Your Mind" did not enter the Flanders Ultratop 50, but peaked at number 63 on the Ultratip chart.)	—	—	52	—	—	—	27	BPI: Silver	Days Are Gone
"My Song 5" (featuring A$AP Ferg)	2014	—	—	—	—	—	—	—	—	—	183		Days Are Gone
"Want You Back"	2017	10	54	— (Note: "Want You Back" did not enter the Flanders Ultratop 50, but peaked at number 2 on the Ultratip chart.)	—	164	88	— (Note: "Want You Back" did not enter the Billboard Japan Hot 100 chart, but peaked at number 17 on the Billboard Japan Hot Overseas Songs chart.)	— (Note: "Want You Back" did not enter the NZ Top 40 Singles Chart, but peaked at number four on the NZ Heatseekers Singles Chart.)	94	56	BPI: Silver	Something to Tell You
"Little of Your Love"	2017	24	85	— (Note: "Little of Your Love" did not enter the Flanders Ultratop 50, but charted as an "extra tip" on the Ultratip chart.)	—	—	—	—	— (Note: "Little of Your Love" did not enter the NZ Top 40 Singles Chart, but peaked at number ten on the NZ Heatseekers Singles Chart.)	—	— (Note: "Little of Your Love" did not enter the UK Singles Chart, but peaked at number 91 on the UK Singles Sales Chart.)		Something to Tell You
"Nothing's Wrong"	2017	—	—	—	—	—	—	—	—	—	—		Something to Tell You
"Summer Girl"	2019	27	—	— (Note: "Summer Girl" did not enter the Flanders Ultratop 50, but peaked at number 21 on the Ultratip chart.)	—	—	—	— (Note: "Summer Girl" did not enter the Billboard Japan Hot 100 chart, but peaked at number 10 on the Billboard Japan Hot Overseas Songs chart.)	— (Note: "Summer Girl" did not enter the NZ Top 40 Singles Chart, but peaked at number 15 on the NZ Hot Singles Chart.)	—	— (Note: "Summer Girl" did not enter the UK Singles Chart, but peaked at number 94 on the UK Singles Sales Chart.)		Women in Music Pt. III
"Now I'm in It"	2019	9	—	— (Note: "Now I'm in It" did not enter the Flanders Ultratop 50, but peaked at number 22 on the Ultratip chart.)	—	—	—	—	— (Note: "Now I'm in It" did not enter the NZ Top 40 Singles Chart, but peaked at number 25 on the NZ Hot Singles Chart.)	74	— (Note: "Now I'm in It" did not enter the UK Singles Chart, but peaked at number 70 on the UK Singles Sales Chart.)	BPI: Silver	Women in Music Pt. III
"Hallelujah"	2019	38	—	—	—	—	—	—	—	—	—		Women in Music Pt. III
"The Steps"	2020	24	—	— (Note: "The Steps" did not enter the Flanders Ultratop 50, but peaked at number 20 on the Ultratip chart.)	—	—	—	—	—	—	—		Women in Music Pt. III
"I Know Alone"	2020	29	—	— (Note: "I Know Alone" did not enter the Flanders Ultratop 50, but charted as an "extra tip" on the Ultratip chart.)	—	—	—	—	— (Note: "I Know Alone" did not enter the NZ Top 40 Singles Chart, but peaked at number 40 on the NZ Hot Singles Chart.)	—	—		Women in Music Pt. III
"Don't Wanna"	2020	26	—	— (Note: "Don't Wanna" did not enter the Flanders Ultratop 50, but peaked at number 26 on the Ultratip chart.)	—	—	—	—	—	—	—		Women in Music Pt. III
"Gasoline" (featuring Taylor Swift)	2021	21	—	— (Note: "Gasoline" did not enter the Flanders Ultratop 50, but peaked at number 28 on the Ultratip chart.)	—	—	—	—	— (Note: "Gasoline" did not enter the NZ Top 40 Singles Chart, but peaked at number 23 on the NZ Hot Singles Chart.)	—	— (Note: "Gasoline" did not enter the UK Singles Chart, but peaked at number 60 on the UK Singles Downloads Chart.)		Women in Music Pt. III
"Lost Track"	2022	—	—	—	—	—	—	— (Note: "Lost Track" did not enter the Billboard Japan Hot 100 chart, but peaked at number 10 on the Billboard Japan Hot Overseas Songs chart.)	—	—	—		Non-album single
"Relationships"	2025	23	—	—	107	—	—	— (Note: "Relationships" did not enter the Billboard Japan Hot 100 chart, but peaked at number 4 on the Billboard Japan Hot Overseas Songs chart.)	— (Note: "Relationships" did not enter the NZ Top 40 Singles Chart, but peaked at number 17 on the NZ Hot Singles Chart.)	—	71		I Quit
"Everybody's Trying to Figure Me Out"	2025	—	—	—	—	—	—	— (Note: "Everybody's Trying to Figure Me Out" did not enter the Billboard Japan Hot 100 chart, but peaked at number 19 on the Billboard Japan Hot Overseas Songs chart.)	— (Note: "Everybody's Trying to Figure Me Out" did not enter the NZ Top 40 Singles Chart, but peaked at number 40 on the NZ Hot Singles Chart.)	—	—		I Quit
"Down to Be Wrong"	2025	—	—	—	183	—	—	— (Note: "Down to Be Wrong" did not enter the Billboard Japan Hot 100 chart, but peaked at number 13 on the Billboard Japan Hot Overseas Songs chart.)	— (Note: "Down to Be Wrong" did not enter the NZ Top 40 Singles Chart, but peaked at number 25 on the NZ Hot Singles Chart.)	—	—		I Quit
"Take Me Back"	2025	—	—	—	—	—	—	— (Note: "Take Me Back" did not enter the Billboard Japan Hot 100 chart, but peaked at number 2 on the Billboard Japan Hot Overseas Songs chart.)	— (Note: "Take Me Back" did not enter the NZ Top 40 Singles Chart, but peaked at number 32 on the NZ Hot Singles Chart.)	—	—		I Quit
"—" denotes a single that did not chart or was not released in that territory.

=== As featured artist ===
List of singles as featured artist, with selected chart positions and certifications shown
Title	Year	Peak chart positions										Certifications	Album
Title	Year	US	AUS	BEL (Fl)	BEL (Wa)	CAN	FRA	GER	IRE	NZ	UK	Certifications	Album
"Bite Down" (Bastille featuring Haim)	2014	—	—	—	—	—	—	—	—	—	—		VS. (Other People's Heartache, Pt. III)
"Meltdown" (Stromae featuring Lorde, Pusha T, Q-Tip and Haim)	2014	—	—	7	5	—	107	—	—	— (Note: "Meltdown" did not enter the NZ Top 40 Singles Chart, but peaked at number nineteen on the NZ Artist Singles Chart.)	—		The Hunger Games: Mockingjay Pt. 1
"Pray to God" (Calvin Harris featuring Haim)	2015	— (Note: "Pray to God" did not enter the Billboard Hot 100, but peaked at number six on the Bubbling Under Hot 100 Singles chart, which acts as an extension to the main chart.)	15	— (Note: "Pray to God" did not enter the Flanders Ultratop 50, but peaked at number 2 on the Ultratip chart.)	36	68	59	23	21	39	35	ARIA: 2× Platinum; BPI: Gold; BVMI: Gold; RMNZ: Gold; RIAA: Gold	Motion
"Saturdays" (Twin Shadow featuring Haim)	2018	—	—	—	—	—	—	—	—	—	—		Caer
"No Body, No Crime" (Taylor Swift featuring Haim)	2020	34	16	—	—	11	—	—	11	29	19	ARIA: Platinum; BPI: Silver; RMNZ: Gold	Evermore
"—" denotes a single that did not chart or was not released in that territory.

=== Promotional singles ===
Title	Year	Peak chart position	Album
Title	Year	US Rock	Album
"Right Now"	2017	44	Something to Tell You
"That Don't Impress Me Much" (Triple J Like a Version)	2018	―	Non-album promotional singles
"Walking Away" (Mura Masa Remix)	2018	―	Non-album promotional singles
"Feel the Thunder (The Croods: A New Age)"	2020	―	The Croods: A New Age (Original Motion Picture Soundtrack)
"3 AM" (Toro y Moi Remix)	2020	―	Non-album promotional singles
"Cherry Flavored Stomach Ache" (from The Last Letter from Your Lover)	2021	―	Non-album promotional singles

== Other charted songs ==
Title	Year	Peak chart position					Album
Title	Year	US Dance	US Rock	JPN Over.	NZ Hot	UK	Album
"Better Off"	2013	—	—	—	—	163	Forever EP
"Go Slow"	2013	—	—	—	—	— (Note: "Go Slow" did not enter the UK Singles Chart, but peaked at number 99 on the UK Streaming Chart.)	Days Are Gone
"Let Me Go"	2013	—	—	—	—	125	Days Are Gone
"Something to Tell You"	2017	—	—	—	— (Note: "Something to Tell You" did not enter the NZ Top 40 Singles Chart, and the Hot Singles Chart did not exist at the time, but it peaked at number 10 on the Heatseekers Singles Chart.)	—	Something to Tell You
"So Bad" (Gesaffelstein featuring Haim)	2019	50	—	—	—	—	Hyperion
"Gasoline"	2020	—	30	—	—	—	Women in Music Pt. III
"Home"	2023	—	35	—	—	—	Barbie the Album
"All Over Me"	2025	—	49	10	36	—	I Quit
"Tie You Down" (with Bon Iver)	2025	—	—	9	26	—	I Quit
"—" denotes a single that did not chart or was not released in that territory.

== Guest appearances ==
Title	Year	Other artist(s)	Album
"Won't Stop"	2012	Childish Gambino	Royalty
"LVL"	2013	ASAP Rocky	Long. Live. ASAP
"Red Eye"	2013	Kid Cudi	Indicud
"You're No Good"	2013	Major Lazer	Free The Universe
"Meltdown"	2014	Stromae, Lorde, Pusha T, Q-Tip	The Hunger Games: Mockingjay, Part 1
"Bite Down"	2014	Bastille	VS (Other People's Heartache Pt. III)
"Holes in the Sky"	2015	M83	The Divergent Series: Insurgent
"Making the Most of the Night"	2015	Carly Rae Jepsen	E•MO•TION
"Without You"	2015	Tobias Jesso Jr.	Goon
"Lonely Town"	2015	Brandon Flowers	The Desired Effect
"Trippin' on Your Love"	2016	Primal Scream	Chaosmosis
"100% or Nothing"	2016	Primal Scream	Chaosmosis
"Dear to Me"	2016	Electric Guest	Plural
"That's a Lifestyle"	2018	Dirty Projectors	Lamp Lit Prose
"IHOP Parking Lot (feat. Haim & Maya Rudolph)"	2019	The Lonely Island	The Unauthorized Bash Brothers Experience
"Warm"	2019	Charli XCX	Charli
"If It Be Your Will"	2019		Hanukkah+
"Rock N Roll Rules"	2020	Ludwig Göransson	Trolls World Tour: Original Motion Picture Soundtrack
"Home"	2023	none	Barbie the Album

== Remixes ==
Title	Year	Artist	Album
"'Cause I'm a Man"	2015	Tame Impala	Currents

== Music videos ==
Title	Year	Director(s)
"Forever"	2012	Austin Peters
"Don't Save Me"	2012	Austin Peters
"Falling"	2013	Tabitha Denholm
"The Wire"	2013	Jonathan Lia
"If I Could Change Your Mind"	2014	Warren Fu
"My Song 5"	2014	Dugan O'Neal
"Right Now (live)"	2017	Paul Thomas Anderson
"Want You Back"	2017	Jake Schreier
"Little of Your Love"	2017	Paul Thomas Anderson
"Summer Girl"	2019	Paul Thomas Anderson
"Now I'm In It"	2019	Paul Thomas Anderson
"Hallelujah"	2019	Paul Thomas Anderson
"The Steps"	2020	Paul Thomas Anderson, Danielle Haim
"I Know Alone"	2020	Jake Schreier
"Don't Wanna"	2020	Jake Schreier
"Man From The Magazine"	2020	Paul Thomas Anderson
"Lost Track"	2022	Paul Thomas Anderson
"Relationships"	2025	Camille Summers-Valli
