= List of awards and nominations received by Haim =

Haim awards and nominations
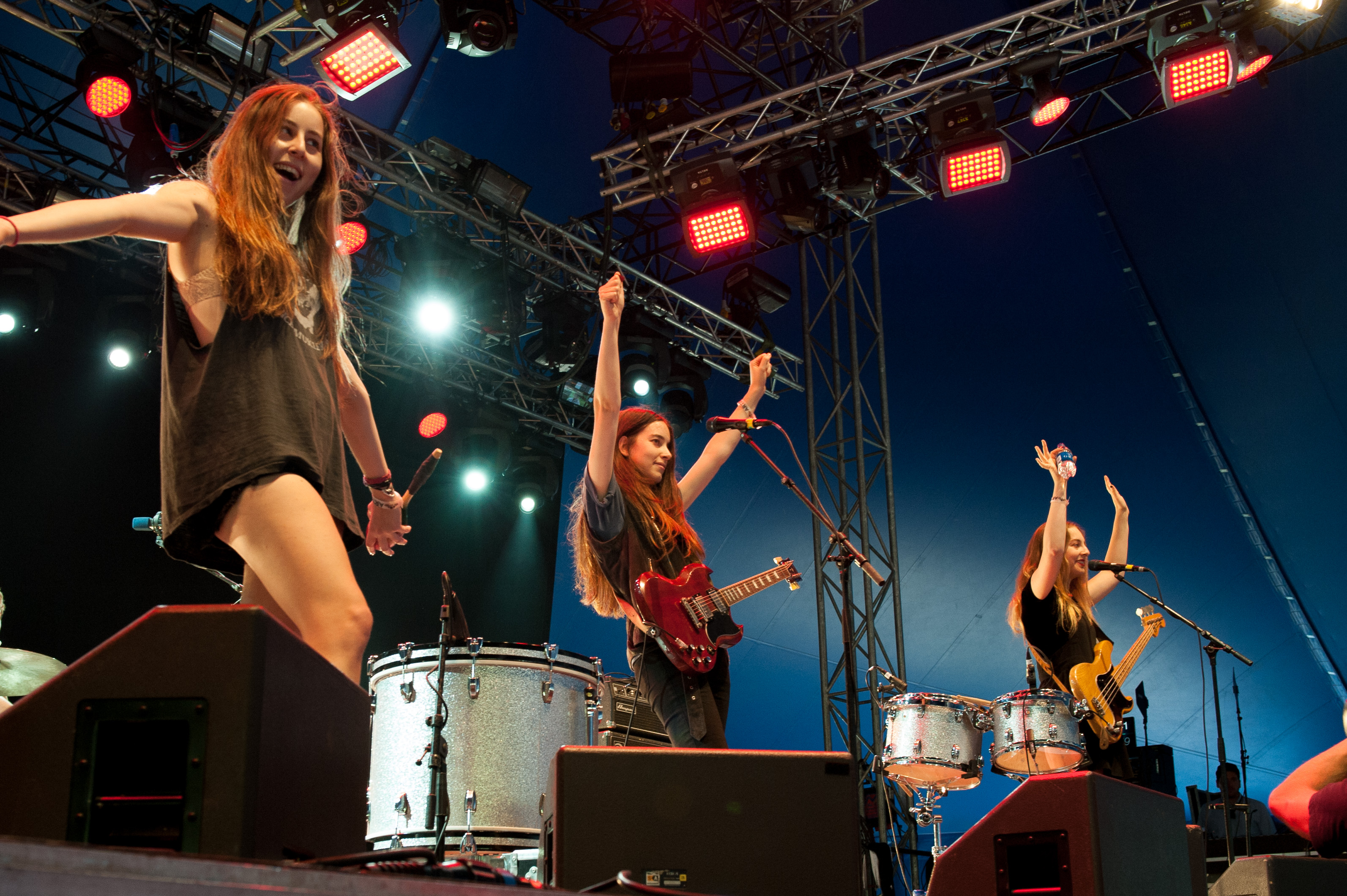
- Haim at the Way Out West Festival, Gothenburg, Sweden in 2013. L to R : Alana, Danielle, Este Haim
Awards and nominations
Award	Wins	Nominations
Brit	1	3
Grammy	0	5
World Music	0	4
MTV	0	1
Sound of...	1	0
NME Awards	4	10
LOS40 Music Awards	0	1

Totals (Note: Certain award groups do not simply award one winner. They acknowledge several different recipients, have runners-up, and have third place. Since this is a specific recognition and is different from losing an award, runner-up mentions are considered wins in this award tally. For simplification and to avoid errors, each award in this list has been presumed to have had a prior nomination.)
- Wins: 8
- Nominations: 34

Haim (/ˈhaɪɪm/ HY-im (Note: According to the band, an English approximation of the original Hebrew, meaning "life", can be "high-im") and stylized as HAIM) is an American pop rock band from Los Angeles, California. The band consists of three sisters Este, Danielle and Alana Haim. The group has released an EP, Forever, and three albums Days Are Gone, Something to Tell You, and Women in Music Pt. III, all of which have achieved commercial and critical success. In 2015, they received their first Grammy Awards nomination for Best New Artist and in 2021 became the first all-female rock group to be nominated for album of the year for Women in Music Pt. III. HAIM has received a total of 8 awards from 34 nominations.

== Awards and nominations ==
Award	Year	Nominee(s)	Category	Result	Ref.
Brit Awards	2014	Themselves	International Group	Nominated	
Brit Awards	2018	Themselves	International Group	Nominated	
Brit Awards	2021	Themselves	International Group	Won	
Brit Awards	2026	Themselves	International Group	Nominated	
GAFFA Awards (Denmark)	2021	Themselves	Best International Band	Nominated	
GAFFA Awards (Denmark)	2021	Women in Music Pt. III	Best International Album	Nominated	
GAFFA Awards (Denmark)	2021	"The Steps"	Best International Hit	Nominated	
Glamour Awards	2022	Themselves	Women of the Year	Won	
Grammy Awards	2015	Themselves	Best New Artist	Nominated	
Grammy Awards	2021	"The Steps"	Best Rock Performance	Nominated	
Grammy Awards	2021	Women in Music Pt. III	Album of the Year	Nominated	
Grammy Awards	2022	Evermore	Album of the Year	Nominated	
Grammy Awards	2026	I Quit	Best Rock Album	Nominated	
LOS40 Music Awards	2017	Themselves	LOS40 Blackjack Artist Award	Nominated	
Music Awards Japan	2026	"Relationships"	Best International Alternative Song in Japan	Nominated	
Music Awards Japan	2026	"Take Me Back"	Best International Alternative Song in Japan	Nominated	
Teen Choice Awards	2015	Themselves	Choice Music Group: Female	Nominated	
UK Music Video Awards	2017	"Want You Back"	Best Pop Video – International	Won	
UK Music Video Awards	2017	Behind the Album	Best Live Concert	Nominated	
UK Music Video Awards	2025	"Relationships"	Best Styling in a Video	Nominated	

== MTV Awards ==
MTV is an American basic cable and satellite television channel owned by the MTV Networks Music & Logo Group, a unit of the Viacom Media Networks division of Viacom. Haim has received no awards from one nomination.

Year	Work	Award	Result	Ref.
2012	Haim	Brand New for 2013	Nominated	

== Music Week Awards ==
The Music Week Awards are the UK's only music awards that recognise labels, publishing, live, retail, A&R, radio, marketing and PR.

Year	Nominee / work	Award	Result
2021	Haim	PR Campaign	Pending

== NME Awards ==
The NME Awards is an annual music awards show in the United Kingdom, founded by the music magazine, NME. Haim has received four awards from ten nominations.

Year	Work	Award	Result	Ref.
2013	Alana Haim	Best Twitter	Won	
2013	"Don't Save Me"	Best Track	Nominated	
2013	"Don't Save Me"	Best Video	Nominated	
2014	Haim	Best Live Band	Nominated	
2014	Haim	Best International Band	Won	
2014	Haim	Best Fan Community	Nominated	
2014	"Falling"	Best Music Video	Nominated	
2014	Alana Haim	Best Band Blog or Twitter	Won	
2014	Este Haim	Hero of the Year	Nominated	
2018	Haim	Best International Band	Won	
2022	Haim	Best Band In The World	Nominated	

== Rober Awards Music Poll ==
Year	Work	Award	Result	Ref.
2013	Themselves	Best Pop Artist	Nominated	
2013	"Falling" (Duke Dumont Remix)	Best Dance Anthem	Nominated	
2020	Themselves	Best Group or Duo	Won	
2020	Themselves	Best Rock Artist	Won	

== Sound of... ==
Sound of... is an annual BBC poll of music critics and industry figures to find the most promising new music talent. Haim has received one award from one nomination.

Year	Work	Award	Result	Ref.
2012	Haim	Sound of 2013	Won	

== The Daily Californian Art Awards ==
Year	Nominee / work	Award	Result	Ref.
2020	Women in Music Pt. III	Best Pop Album	Runner-up	

== World Music Awards ==
The World Music Awards is an international awards ceremony that annually honors recording artists based on worldwide sales figures provided by the International Federation of the Phonographic Industry. Haim has received no awards from four nominations.

Year	Work	Award	Result	Ref.
2014	Haim	Best Band	Nominated	
2014	Haim	Best Live Act	Nominated	
2014	Days Are Gone	Best Album	Nominated	
2014	"The Wire"	Best Song	Nominated	
