= The Croods: A New Age (soundtrack) =

2020 film soundtrack album

Film score by Mark Mothersbaugh
- Released: November 20, 2020
- Recorded: 2020
- Genre: Film score
- Length: 47:50
- Label: Back Lot Music
- Producer: Mark Mothersbaugh

Mark Mothersbaugh chronology
The Willoughbys (2020)	The Croods: A New Age (2020)	The Mitchells vs. the Machines (Original Motion Picture Soundtrack) (2021)

Singles from The Croods: A New Age (Original Motion Picture Soundtrack)
- 1. "Feel the Thunder" Released: November 12, 2020

The Croods: A New Age (Music from the Motion Picture) is the soundtrack album composed by Mark Mothersbaugh for the film of the same name and released by Back Lot Music on November 20, 2020. The single "Feel the Thunder", performed by HAIM, was released on November 12.

== Background and release ==
Mark Mothersbaugh was hired to score The Croods: A New Age in September 2020, replacing the first film's composer Alan Silvestri. The soundtrack featured an original song "Feel the Thunder" performed by HAIM. It was released under the Back Lot Music label on November 12, 2020 as the lead single from the album. The album was released through Back Lot Music on November 20.

== Track listing ==
All music is composed by Mark Mothersbaugh, except as noted.

No.	Title	Writer(s)	Artist	Length
1.	"Guy's Backstory / Guy Meets Eep"			2:17
2.	"Cave Diary"			1:18
3.	"Meet the Croods"			1:37
4.	"Welcome To Tomorrow"			1:33
5.	"Feeding Frenzy"			0:47
6.	"BaNaNa"			0:54
7.	"Meet The Bettermans"			1:35
8.	"House Tour"			0:32
9.	"Meet Dawn"			1:13
10.	"Betterman's Plan"			1:07
11.	"A Betterman Day"			1:30
12.	"Scars Joy Ride"			2:27
13.	"Phil, Grug, Lazy River"			1:37
14.	"Caveman Mancave"			2:53
15.	"Picture Book / Drunken Arrival"			2:25
16.	"Word for Word / Betterman The Tool Maker"			1:04
17.	"Thunder Sisters"			0:57
18.	"Mothers And Daughters"			2:15
19.	"Bone Arena Fight"			1:16
20.	"New Tribe Names"			1:00
21.	"My First Love"			3:00
22.	"Working Together"			1:17
23.	"Explosive Love"			1:52
24.	"I Think I Love You"	Tony Romeo	Tenacious D (Jack Black & Kyle Gass)	3:19
25.	"Feel the Thunder"	Alana Haim, Danielle Haim, Este Haim, and Ariel Rechtshaid	HAIM	2:50
26.	"Travel Log / World's First Neighborhood"			2:34
27.	"We Are Here Together"	Mothersbaugh	HAIM & Jack Black	2:51
Total length:				47:50

== Accolades ==
Award	Date of ceremony	Category	Recipient(s)	Result	Ref.
Hollywood Music in Media Awards	January 27, 2021	Best Original Score in an Animated Film	Mark Mothersbaugh	Nominated	
Hollywood Music in Media Awards	January 27, 2021	Best Original Song in an Animated Film	Alana Haim, Danielle Haim, Este Haim, and Ariel Rechtshaid for "Feel the Thunder"	Nominated	
