= Forever (Haim song) =

2012 single by Haim

Single by Haim

from the album Days Are Gone
- B-side: "Better Off" (10" EP); "Edge" (12" EP)
- Released: October 12, 2012 (10" EP); April 19, 2014 (12" EP)
- Recorded: 2012
- Genre: Pop rock
- Length: 4:06 (album version); 3:47 (radio edit)
- Label: Polydor; Neon Gold (EP only)
- Songwriters: Alana Haim; Danielle Haim; Este Haim
- Producers: Ludwig Göransson; Haim

Haim singles chronology
"Forever" (2012)	"Don't Save Me" (2012)

"Forever" is the debut single by American indie pop rock band Haim, taken from their first studio album, Days Are Gone (2013). Released on October 12, 2012, "Forever" was written by band members Alana Haim, Danielle Haim and Este Haim, while production was done by the band with Ludwig Göransson. The song is a pop rock track, with clattering percussion and tight harmonies.

Lyrically, the track talks about a relationship's do-or-die moment, while its sound was compared to many '80s and '90s tracks, including Fleetwood Mac and its member, Stevie Nicks, Donna Lewis and even Michael Jackson's "Wanna Be Startin' Somethin'". Acclaimed by music critics, "Forever" was named a "killer single", with a dazzling chorus, and some even called one of the best singles of the year. The song draws heavily from the themes of the 1979 cult classic film The Warriors.

"Forever" became the band's first charting single on the charts, reaching moderate positions in Belgium, France, Japan and the United Kingdom, while in the U.S., the song charted in multiple Billboard charts, including the Adult Pop Songs, Alternative Songs, Pop Songs and Rock Songs lists. A music video for the song features the three sisters rocking out in their living room and on their bikes and in a nail salon and all over town, all intercut with videos from their childhood. The song was performed on Jimmy Kimmel Live! and Late Show with David Letterman, as well as at the Glastonbury Festival in both 2013 and 2014.

== Background and release ==
Haim was formed in 2006, in San Fernando Valley, California, after spending their childhood as part of family cover band Rockinhaim. The group toured during the years, until they broke into the scene after a successful show at Texas music festival South by Southwest. It landed them a record deal with Polydor in the UK and subsequently released an EP titled Forever on October 12, 2012. Elsewhere, the song was also released as the lead-single from their debut album, Days Are Gone, released in 2013. On 7 September 2013, the EP was released on cassette for Cassette Store Day. The song impacted alternative radio on January 21, 2014, and released to mainstream radio on April 4, 2014.

== Composition and lyrics ==
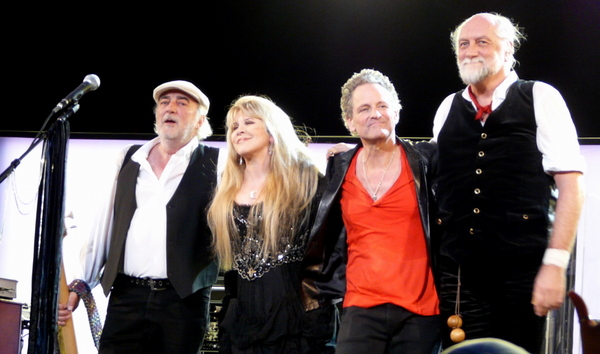
Fleetwood Mac and its member Stevie Nicks were influences for the song, according to some critics.

"Forever" was written by band members Alana, Danielle and Este Haim, who also produced the track along with Ludwig Göransson, a Swedish composer who has helmed the music for the US TV series Community, Happy Endings, New Girl, and The Mandalorian, as well as the film Fruitvale Station. Lyrically, "Forever" talks about a relationship hurtling towards disintegration. Alana provided vocals, guitar, keyboards and synthesizer, Danielle supplied vocals, guitar, percussion and drums, while Este contributed with bass and vocals.

Musically, "Forever" is a pop rock song, featuring staccato melodies and bear-trap drums snap, which were considered similar to some echo of a Jam & Lewis production under ripples of synths lifted from a Teena Marie or Suzi Quatro record by Spin's Mike Powell. Andy Gill of The Independent claimed that the track "brings to mind the likes of The Bangles and The Go-Go's. Laura Studarus of Under the Radar wrote that the song "owes a debt of gratitude to Donna Lewis' 'I Love You Always Forever'." Greg Kot of Chicago Tribune perceived a "nick of Stevie Nicks' 'Stand Back'," while Kevin Harley of The Independent on Sunday saw influences of Fleetwood Mac's Tango in the Night-era.

== Critical reception ==
The song received mostly positive reviews from music critics. Matt James of PopMatters described the song as an "all teasing 'stop-start', Prince percussive crunch and 'Wanna Be Startin' Something' shakin' guitar licks." Brendan Frank of Beats Per Minute called it "an electrifying R&B wiggle", while Michael Roffman of Consequence of Sound praised "the whimsy of spacey reggae anthem". Marc Burrows of The Quietus named it a "killer single", along with "Falling" and "The Wire". Embling of Tiny Mix Tapes shared the same thought, calling them "essentially perfect, every single second engineered within an inch of their lives, to the point where resistance becomes either impossible or unconscionable." In agreement with both critics, Cam Lindsay of Exclaim! acclaimed the singles, writing that they are "the best singles by any one artist on a single release this year."

Larry Fitzmaurice of Pitchfork Media praised the track, writing that it has a "sparkly charm about it, its palm-muted guitars and soaring vocals creating a fizzy effervescence." Laura Studarus of Under the Radar noted that "the sisters' unflinching bombast elevates the percussive hook into a league of its own." El Hunt of DIY Magazine went on to praise the band for "conjur[ing] glimmering pop foundations on ‘Forever’ that spiral upwards in strange geometric structures, built upon gasping, fragmented delivery and plunking bass." Forrest Cardamenis of No Ripcord praised the track, writing an extense article about it, claiming:

"Guitars jangle a bit more, as this one is more rock than R&B, and the lovelorn lyrics, for all their cheesiness, are incredibly endearing. 'Forever' also contains the most memorable chorus on the album, a sprightly contrast to the desperate, bass-heavy verses. The bridge is equally memorable, beginning with a short guitar solo that quickly transitions into a break into a bass/vocal break that quickly gets back to another glorious minute of the care-free, dazzling chorus. Not only does 'Forever' not wear out its welcome, but no single section of it does; it’s a perfect pop song, and a large part of what caused hype for 'Days Are Gone' in the first place."

== Chart performance ==
On January 6, 2013, the song entered the UK Singles Chart at number 86. It later rose to number 75. In Japan, "Forever" peaked at number 45, and though it peaked moderately, the song was the band's highest peak in Japan. In France, "Forever" was the only song by Haim to chart, spending 3 weeks on the charts, although it peaked at number 148. Though the single did not chart on the Billboard Hot 100, it has sold steadily since the release of the Forever EP and has sold over 77,000 copies as of March 2014 in the US. The song charted on the Alternative Songs chart, debuting at number 40, becoming the group's first charting single. The song also reached the Adult Pop Songs chart, debuting at number 39 and peaking at number 33, while also peaking at number 36 on the Pop Songs chart.

== Music video ==
A music video directed by Austin Peters to accompany the release of "Forever" was first released on The Guardian website and later onto YouTube on June 7, 2012, at a total length of four minutes and six seconds. The video for "Forever" features old footage of the sisters as kids on holiday intercut with shots of them riding on their bikes and in the salon, while guys do wheelies on motorcycles. According to Este Haim, "A lot of that video consists of our personal home videos, so there definitely is a strong nostalgic childhood vibe there."

Michael Cragg of The Guardian called it "the perfect mix of studied cool, 90s teen drama, and Destiny's Child dance moves." The website Los Angeles, I'm Yours named it "a really sweet, innocent video that is a fantastic first effort for them in terms of a video." Jacob Moore of Complex Magazine claimed: "Watching Haim's new video for 'Forever' makes it hard not to be in a good mood."

== Live performances ==
On June 10, 2013, Haim performed the track on Late Show with David Letterman. They also performed "Forever" during the Glastonbury Festival 2013, as well as at the following year's festival. On December 18, 2013, the trio appeared on Jimmy Kimmel Live! and performed the song alongside "The Wire". On May 10, 2014, "Forever" was part of Haim's setlist on their show on "Terminal 5".

== Track listing ==
=== 10" EP, CD, cassette and digital ===
1. "Better Off" – 3:37
2. "Forever" (album version) – 4:06
3. "Go Slow" – 4:16
4. "Forever" (Dan Lissvik remix) – 4:00

=== Promo CD ===
1. "Forever" (radio edit) – 3:49
2. "Forever" (instrumental) – 4:06

=== Record Store Day 2014 12" EP ===
1. "Forever" (album version) – 4:06
2. "Forever" (Giorgio Moroder remix) – 4:17
3. "Edge" – 3:39

== Charts ==
=== Weekly charts ===
Chart (2012–2014)	Peak position
Belgium (Ultratip Bubbling Under Flanders)	27
Belgium (Ultratip Bubbling Under Wallonia)	44
France (SNEP)	148
Japan Hot 100 (Billboard)	49
UK Singles (OCC)	75
US Hot Rock Songs (Billboard)	24
US Hot Singles Sales (Billboard)	4
US Adult Pop Airplay (Billboard)	33
US Alternative Airplay (Billboard)	40
US Pop Airplay (Billboard)	36

=== Year-end charts ===
Chart (2014)	Position
US Hot Rock Songs (Billboard)	73

== Certifications ==
Region	Certification	Certified units/sales
United Kingdom (BPI)	Silver	200,000^{‡}
^{‡} Sales+streaming figures based on certification alone.

== Release history ==
Release dates and formats for "Forever"
Region	Date	Format	Label(s)	Ref.
United States	April 8, 2014	Mainstream airplay	Columbia	
