= Falling (Haim song) =

Single by Haim

from the album Days Are Gone
- Released: February 12, 2013
- Recorded: 2012
- Genre: Pop rock; R&B
- Length: 4:19 (album version); 3:47 (radio edit)
- Label: Polydor
- Songwriter(s): Alana Haim; Danielle Haim; Este Haim; Morgan Meyn Nagler
- Producer(s): Ariel Rechtshaid; Alana Haim; Danielle Haim; Este Haim

Haim singles chronology
"Don't Save Me" (2012)	"Falling" (2013)	"The Wire" (2013)

Music video
- "Falling" on YouTube

"Falling" is a song by American group Haim. The song was released in the United Kingdom on February 12, 2013. It was the third single from their debut studio album, Days Are Gone. The song peaked at number 30 on the UK Singles Chart. A music video of "Falling" was released on YouTube on February 19, 2013. The video was shot in the hills near Pasadena, California. The video's director was Tabitha Denholm, formerly of the band Queens of Noize.

== Track listing ==
Digital download – single
No.	Title	Length
1.	"Falling"	4:19

Digital download – remixes
No.	Title	Length
1.	"Falling"	4:19
2.	"Falling" (Live At the iTunes Festival, 2012)	5:19
3.	"Falling" (Duke Dumont Remix)	5:35
4.	"Falling" (Psychemagik Remix)	5:54

10" vinyl
No.	Title	Length
1.	"Falling"	4:19
2.	"Falling" (Duke Dumont Remix)	5:35
3.	"Falling" (Psychemagik Remix)	5:54

== Chart performance ==
Chart (2013–14)	Peak position
Australia (ARIA)	85
Ireland (IRMA)	61
Mexico Ingles Airplay (Billboard)	43
UK Singles (OCC)	30
US Hot Rock Songs (Billboard)	45

=== Year-end charts ===
Chart (2013)	Peak position
UK Singles (Official Charts Company)	184

== Certifications ==
Region	Certification	Certified units/sales
United Kingdom (BPI)	Silver	200,000^{‡}
^{‡} Sales+streaming figures based on certification alone.
