= No Body, No Crime =

2021 single by Taylor Swift featuring Haim

Single by Taylor Swift featuring Haim

from the album Evermore
- Released: January 11, 2021
- Studio: Long Pond (Hudson Valley); Ariel Rechtshaid's house (Los Angeles)
- Genre: Americana; country; country pop; country rock
- Length: 3:35
- Label: Republic
- Songwriter: Taylor Swift
- Producers: Taylor Swift; Aaron Dessner

Taylor Swift singles chronology
| "Willow" (2020) | "No Body, No Crime" (2021) | "Coney Island" (2021) |

Haim singles chronology
| "Don't Wanna" (2020) | "No Body, No Crime" (2021) | "Gasoline" (2021) |

Lyric video
- "No Body, No Crime" on YouTube

"No Body, No Crime" is a song by the American singer-songwriter Taylor Swift featuring the American band Haim, from Swift's ninth studio album, Evermore (2020). She wrote the track as a result of her fixation with crime documentaries and podcasts, and produced it with Aaron Dessner. A murder ballad featuring styles of Americana, country, country pop, and country rock, "No Body, No Crime" is about the killing of a woman named Este, narrated by her friend who avenges her. Republic Records in partnership with MCA Nashville sent the song to US country radio on January 11, 2021, as a single from Evermore.

Some music critics praised "No Body, No Crime" for its country production and airy quality; others deemed the concept and Haim's contribution underwhelming. Commercially, the song peaked at number 16 on the Billboard Global 200 chart and reached the top 20 in Australia, Canada, Ireland, and the United Kingdom. It received certifications in Australia, Brazil, New Zealand, and the United Kingdom. Swift and Haim performed the song live on shows where Haim served as an opening act on Swift's Eras Tour in 2023.

== Background and production ==
During the COVID-19 lockdowns, Taylor Swift wrote and produced her eighth studio album, Folklore, with Aaron Dessner and Jack Antonoff. She conceived it as a set of mythopoeic visuals in her mind, a result of her imagination "running wild" while isolating herself during the lockdowns. Surprise-released on July 24, 2020, Folklore was met with critical acclaim and commercial success. In September 2020, Swift, Antonoff, and Dessner assembled at Long Pond Studio in the Hudson Valley to film Folklore: The Long Pond Studio Sessions, a documentary that features Swift performing all of the seventeen tracks of Folklore and discussing the creative process and inspirations behind the album. After filming, the three celebrated Folklore's success and unexpectedly continued writing songs while staying at Long Pond. The result was Swift's ninth studio album, Evermore, which she described as a "sister record" to Folklore.

Swift wrote "No Body, No Crime" on a rubber-bridge guitar, inspired by her fixation on crime documentaries and podcasts. She sent a voice memo recording to Dessner, who later produced the track with her. Swift had specific ideas on how the song should feel and wanted the American band Haim to contribute vocals to it. She sent the track to one of the members, Este Haim, and asked if they would be willing to sing on it; they approved immediately. "No Body, No Crime" was recorded by Dessner and Jonathan Low at Long Pond, where Low additionally mixed it and recorded Swift's vocals. Este Haim and Danielle Haim provided background vocals, recorded by Ariel Rechtshaid and Matt DiMona at Rechtshaid's house in Los Angeles. The track was mastered by Greg Calbi and Steve Fallone at Sterling Sound Studios in Edgewater, New Jersey. Dessner additionally provided field recording and played piano, bass guitar, acoustic guitar, electric guitar, mandolin, and synthesizers. Josh Kaufman played lap steel guitar, electric guitar, organ, and harmonica, and J.T. Bates played drums.

== Music and lyrics ==
"No Body, No Crime"
"No Body, No Crime" begins with police sirens and whispers of "He did it" before proceeding with its country production.

"No Body, No Crime" is three minutes and thirty-five seconds long. Music journalists identified it as a murder ballad and a breakup song that features a midtempo rhythm; they categorized the track as Americana, country, country pop, and country rock. (Note: Attributed to Rolling Stone's Claire Shaffer, Vulture's Justin Curto, New Statesman's Ellen Peirson-Hagger, The Guardian's Alexis Petridis, Slate's Carl Wilson, The Ringer's Rob Harvilla, Taste of Country's Carena Liptak, and Slant Magazine's Jonathan Keefe) Madeline Crone of American Songwriter thought Haim brought elements of pop rock to the song. "No Body, No Crime" features twang in Swift's voice and on the guitars—Justin Curto of Vulture opined that her performance is the "twangiest [she] has sounded" since her fourth studio album, Red (2012). The song starts with police sirens and whispers of "He did it". Some publications compared the composition of "No Body, No Crime" to the work of other country musicians, including Martina McBride's "Independence Day" (1994), the Dixie Chicks' "Goodbye Earl" (2000), Carrie Underwood's "Before He Cheats" (2006), and the music of Miranda Lambert.

The track tells a macabre story that incorporates themes of infidelity, vengeance, and unsolved murders. It revolves around a woman called Este, named after Este Haim, who confronts her cheating husband and is subsequently murdered. The narrator, Este's friend, kills the husband and frames the mistress who took out a large life insurance policy; Este's sister becomes an alibi who testifies they were together. The refrain consists of the repeated phrase: "I think he did it but I just can't prove it". NME's Hannah Mylrea compared the lyrical imagery to the films of David Fincher.

== Release and promotion ==
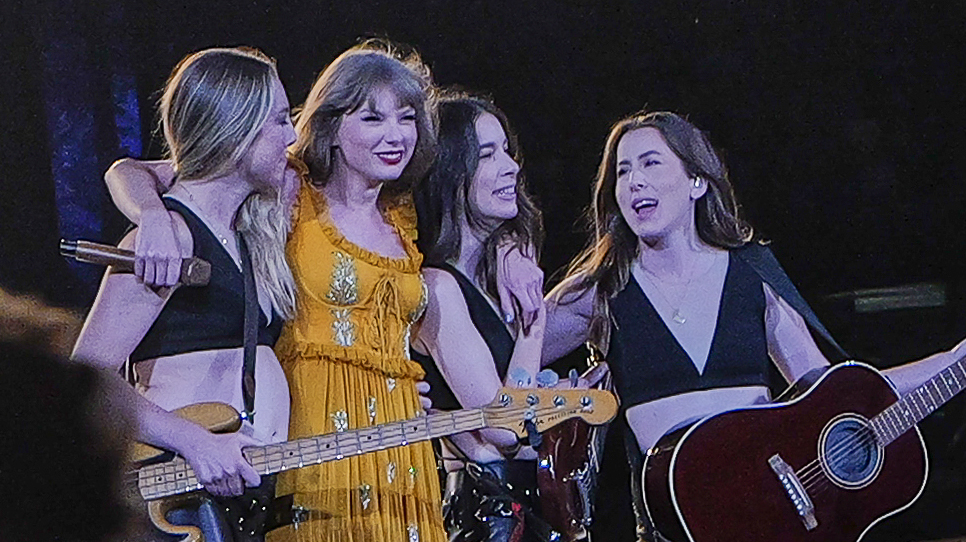
Swift after performing "No Body, No Crime" with Haim at the Eras Tour in 2023

"No Body, No Crime" is the sixth track on Evermore, which was surprise-released by Republic Records on December 11, 2020. The label partnered with MCA Nashville and promoted the song to country radio stations in the United States on January 11, 2021, as a single from the album. In March 2023, Swift embarked on her sixth concert tour, the Eras Tour, which featured various opening acts at certain shows, one of which was Haim. At shows opened by the band, "No Body, No Crime" replaced "'Tis the Damn Season" as the opening number for the Evermore act. It contained an alternative country edge compared to the studio version. Each Haim member performed with either an acoustic guitar, a bass guitar, or an electric guitar and sang with Swift. On June 15, 2024, Swift performed the track on acoustic guitar in a mashup with her song "Carolina" (2022) at the third Liverpool show of the tour.

When "No Body, No Crime" was released, the CEO of the American casual dining restaurant chain Olive Garden, Gene Lee, credited Swift for creating newfound buzz with the brand after she referenced it in the song. In 2021, the true crime podcast Crime Junkie ran an April Fools' Day episode depicting the case of a murder victim named Esther Hollis, a reinvention of the fictional victim in "No Body, No Crime". Swift reacted with delight, giving the episode "13 stars" and commenting that she changed Este Haim's name in her phone to "Esther Hollis".

== Critical reception ==
Some music critics praised "No Body, No Crime" for its airy country production. Stereogum's Tom Breihan considered it "the most country thing that Swift has done in years", and USA Today's Patrick Ryan dubbed it a "scorching" song that marks her "mischievous return" to her country roots. Variety's Chris Willman described it as the album's "pure spirit of fun" moment, away from the ruminating themes of other tracks. Billboard's Jason Lipshutz similarly viewed it as a delightful song that offers optimism and lightness in contrast to the emotional turmoil of Evermore; he considered it the second best track on the album. Mylrea commended the song for blending various genres, and Spin's Bobby Olivier praised the refrain as catchy.

Other critics commented on the concept and the minimal utilization of Haim's vocals. Robert Christgau, in his "Consumer Guide" column, wrote although "No Body, No Crime" was the first track he paid attention to on Evermore, it became his least favorite after repeated listens; he described it as "super-hooky but pat police procedural". Curto complimented Haim's performance for livening up Evermore's "static pacing", but considered the narrative rather dull and Swift's songwriting not as strong as on her past songs about revenge. New Statesman's Ellen Peirson-Hagger viewed it as one of the few missteps on the album; she thought the overall sound seemed forced due to the repeated refrain and the lack of vibrant energy that Haim showcase in their music. Slate's Carl Wilson similarly criticized the underutilization of Haim solely as background vocalists. "No Body, No Crime" appeared in rankings of Swift's discography by Rolling Stone's Rob Sheffield (192 out of 286) and Vulture's Nate Jones (202 out of 245).

== Commercial performance ==
"No Body, No Crime" reached number 16 on the Billboard Global 200 and peaked within the top 30 in Canada (11), Ireland (11), Australia (16), the United Kingdom (19), Singapore (28), and New Zealand (29). In the United States, it reached number 2 on the Billboard Hot Country Songs chart, number 12 on the Rolling Stone Top 100 chart, number 34 on the Billboard Hot 100 chart, and number 54 on the Billboard Country Airplay chart. The track became Haim's first entry on the Billboard Hot 100 chart. It also charted at number 70 in Slovakia and number 83 in Portugal. The song was certified platinum in Australia, gold in Brazil and New Zealand, and silver in the United Kingdom.

== Personnel ==
Credits are adapted from the liner notes of Evermore.

- Taylor Swift − lead vocals, songwriter, producer
- Haim – featured artist
  - Danielle Haim − background vocals
  - Este Haim − background vocals
- Aaron Dessner − producer, recording engineer, field recording, piano, bass guitar, acoustic guitar, electric guitar, mandolin, synthesizers
- Jonathan Low − recording engineer, Swift's vocal recording engineer, mixing engineer
- Ariel Rechtshaid − Haim's vocal recording engineer
- Matt DiMona − Haim's vocal recording engineer
- Greg Calbi − mastering engineer
- Steve Fallone − mastering engineer
- Josh Kaufman − lap steel guitar, electric guitar, organ, harmonica
- J.T. Bates − drums

== Charts ==
Chart performance for "No Body, No Crime"
| Chart (2020–2021) | Peak position |
|---|---|
| Australia (ARIA) | 16 |
| Canada Hot 100 (Billboard) | 11 |
| Global 200 (Billboard) | 16 |
| Ireland (IRMA) | 11 |
| New Zealand (Recorded Music NZ) | 29 |
| Portugal (AFP) | 83 |
| Singapore (RIAS) | 28 |
| Slovakia Airplay (ČNS IFPI) | 70 |
| UK Singles (Official Charts) | 19 |
| US Billboard Hot 100 | 34 |
| US Country Airplay (Billboard) | 54 |
| US Hot Country Songs (Billboard) | 2 |
| US Rolling Stone Top 100 | 12 |

== Certifications ==
Certifications for "No Body, No Crime"
| Region | Certification | Certified units/sales |
|---|---|---|
| Australia (ARIA) | Platinum | 70,000^{‡} |
| Brazil (Pro-Música Brasil) | Gold | 20,000^{‡} |
| New Zealand (RMNZ) | Gold | 15,000^{‡} |
| United Kingdom (BPI) | Silver | 200,000^{‡} |
^{‡} Sales+streaming figures based on certification alone.
