= If I Could Change Your Mind =

Single by Haim

from the album Days Are Gone
- Released: March 21, 2014
- Recorded: 2012
- Genre: Indie pop; funk rock; dance-rock
- Length: 3:50
- Label: Polydor
- Songwriter(s): Alana Haim; Danielle Haim; Este Haim; James Ford
- Producer(s): James Ford; Alana Haim; Danielle Haim; Este Haim

Haim singles chronology
"The Wire" (2013)	"If I Could Change Your Mind" (2014)	"My Song 5" (2014)

Music video
- "If I Could Change Your Mind" on YouTube

"If I Could Change Your Mind" is a song by American rock band Haim. It was released on March 21, 2014 as the fifth single from their debut studio album, Days Are Gone (2013). It was the most searched for indie-rock track of 2014 on Shazam.

== Description ==
Hazel Sheffield of NME considered the song to be similar to a Whitney Houston record.

== Music video ==
The video for "If I Could Change Your Mind", directed by Warren Fu, was released on February 25, 2014.

== Chart performance ==
The song peaked at number 27 on the UK Singles Chart.

=== Weekly charts ===
Chart (2013–14)	Peak position
Ireland (IRMA)	52
Scotland (OCC)	30
UK Singles (OCC)	27
US Hot Rock Songs (Billboard)	42

== Certifications ==
Region	Certification	Certified units/sales
United Kingdom (BPI)	Silver	200,000^{‡}
^{‡} Sales+streaming figures based on certification alone.
