= The Mitchells vs. the Machines (soundtrack) =

The Mitchells vs. the Machines (Original Motion Picture Soundtrack)

Film score by Mark Mothersbaugh
- Released: April 30, 2021
- Recorded: 2020–2021
- Genres: Film score; electronic; pop; trance; jazz
- Length: 64:35
- Label: Sony Classical
- Producer: Mark Mothersbaugh

Mark Mothersbaugh chronology
The Croods: A New Age (2020)	The Mitchells vs. the Machines (Original Motion Picture Soundtrack) (2021)	America: The Motion Picture (2021)

The Mitchells vs. the Machines (Original Motion Picture Soundtrack) is the soundtrack album to the 2021 animated film computer-animated film of the same name. The album, released by Sony Classical Records on April 30, 2021, coinciding with the film's Netflix release, features an original score composed by Mark Mothersbaugh, and an original song titled "On My Way" (which was played during the end credits) performed by Alex Lahey. Songs from various artists, including T.I., Los Campesinos!, Sigur Rós, Talking Heads, Grimes, Le Tigre, BTS, The Mae Shi and Madeon, were incorporated in the film.

== Development ==
Following the release of the film's first trailer in March 2020, one of the film's producers Phil Lord confirmed on Twitter, that his and Christopher Miller's regular collaborator Mark Mothersbaugh would score music for the film. It also marks as his sixth collaboration with Sony Pictures Animation, after scoring the Cloudy with a Chance of Meatballs films (which Lord and Miller were involved) and the first three Hotel Transylvania films. According to Variety, Mothersbaugh stated that each family member had their score in the beginning. For Rick Mitchell's character, he created the score cue by blending ukulele, guitar, banjo and harmonica and for Katie's character, he produced the score from woodwinds, while the kids had a "younger sound with electronica (modern instrumentation)" and synth sounds were created for the dysfunctional robots, to make sure that the listeners think about music in different ways. Mothersbaugh stated that "It's like you have 100 people sitting in a room and they're waiting for the countdown to start playing. There's people breathing, their hearts are beating and blood's pumping through them. That's part of the music."

Kier Lehman was the music supervisor, who had incorporated specific songs from the film, which Mike Rianda had stated "if basically, the movie felt like someone's personal playlist, it would feel like gratifying. Just like when I watch a Wes Anderson movie or Quentin Tarantino movie, it's like, I might not know about the songs, but I'm like, 'This person loves these songs.' Like you could feel it. They're these deep cuts on the album, and they're not these like obvious songs. And so, we basically wanted to try to do that with the movie. And it was tough. I mean, because sometimes the song you want isn't easy to get. The artist doesn't want to release it, or it just doesn't work in the moment or something." So he worked with Lehman for the supervision, whom regularly worked in Lord and Miller's films. Rianda stated that "He's so cool, and he could get us all the songs that we wanted and sort of figure out how to make it all work."

An original song, "On My Way" performed by Alex Lahey was included in the film, and was released separately, as a lyrical music video on May 6, 2021. Lahey had stated the track as "a song about new beginnings. I really wanted to capture Katie's sense of urgency to grow up and expand her horizons while being grateful of where she has come from and the people that have gotten her where she is. It's that push and pull of being on a path towards something new and exciting while remembering and celebrating what you're leaving behind – I think that's something we can all relate to." Additionally, the trailer featured the song Mic Drop by BTS, specifically the Steve Aoki remix.

== Track listing ==
No.	Title	Length
1.	"Columbia Opening / Apocalypse"	1:15
2.	"Katie's Life / Good Cop Dog Cop"	3:17
3.	"Laptop Breaks / Home Movies"	3:43
4.	"Rise of the Robots"	1:30
5.	"Robots Falling from the Sky"	1:25
6.	"Eat Laser Robots"	1:15
7.	"Robots Capture Humans"	1:36
8.	"On the Roof H"	1:53
9.	"Two Dumb Robots"	0:55
10.	"We Could Get Our Lives Back"	0:13
11.	"Katie's Speech"	1:28
12.	"Drive Drive!"	2:07
13.	"Robots March on PAL"	0:45
14.	"Foolish Human Air"	0:53
15.	"Abandoned Mall!"	1:35
16.	"Mall Robots Attack"	1:56
17.	"Furbies Attack_Router Knocked Out"	3:29
18.	"Rick's Pep Talk"	2:21
19.	"The Stealthbots"	1:21
20.	"Katie and Linda"	1:56
21.	"Entering Robot City"	3:05
22.	"The Pod Falls"	0:51
23.	"They Capture Linda and Rick"	0:57
24.	"Hiding in the Woods"	2:36
25.	"Katie's Video"	1:52
26.	"Katie to the Rescue"	2:03
27.	"Screwdriver Escape"	1:47
28.	"Yub Tub"	2:00
29.	"Linda Kicks Ass"	1:35
30.	"Katie Explains"	1:45
31.	"Katie and Rick Work Together"	2:17
32.	"I'm a Mitchell!"	0:44
33.	"Humanity Is Saved"	1:17
34.	"Katie's Dead"	0:56
35.	"Arriving at College"	2:32
36.	"On My Way" (performed by Alex Lahey)	3:05
Total length:		64:35

== Additional music ==
Songs that are featured in the film, but not included in the soundtrack:

- "Lamb and the Lion" – The Mae Shi
- "Death to Los Campesinos!" – Los Campesinos!
- "I Want More" – Bangs
- "Nyan Cat" – Daniwell
- "Live Your Life" – T.I. feat. Rihanna
- "California" – Grimes
- "Hoppípolla" – Sigur Rós
- "Inní mér syngur vitleysingur" – Sigur Rós
- "(Nothing But) Flowers" – Talking Heads
- "Every Day's the Weekend" – Alex Lahey
- "Life of the Party" – PRTY H3RO
- "Icarus" – Madeon
- "The Blue Danube Op. 314" – Johann Strauss II
- "Another Lonely Hangover" – Swinging Doors
- "He Was Strange (But I Needed a Ride)" – Travis Whitelaw
- "On the Verge" – Le Tigre
- "Battle Without Honor or Humanity" – Tomayasu Hotei
- "Walk the Dinosaur" – Was (Not Was)
- "Dreamy Wonder" – Tempura Kidz
- "Ironside" – Quincy Jones
- "Broken Heartbeats Sound Like Breakbeats" – Los Campesinos!

== Reception ==
Film Music Central wrote a review, saying: "Mothersbaugh has created a delightful blend of several musical genres that make for a great experience. The music for The Mitchells vs The Machines is a blend of action music, sci-fi music, and family music. It's really mind-blowing when the music switches over from the quiet-ish family music opening to the sci-fi music that enters when the robot apocalypse begins. That's not the easiest transition to make given the wide disparity between those two styles, but Mothersbaugh makes it feel easy and the music pulls you along for the ride without hardly missing a beat." Jonathan Broxton, wrote "Anyone familiar with Mothersbaugh's music for animated films can guess what they're going to find with this score. The film and score are an odd but charming mix of styles that change on a dime, occasionally punctuated by surprisingly emotional moments. Those who don't care for short tracks and frequent tonal shifts may be put off by much of the score, and the thematic ideas here are short enough that they may be hard to pick out on a first or second listen, but the music serves the film very well, and has several highlights that are definitely worth a listen."

== Charts ==
Chart (2021)	Peak position
UK Independent Albums (OCC)	24
UK Soundtrack Albums (OCC)	11
US Billboard 200	89
US Soundtrack Albums (Billboard)	23
