= Don't Save Me (Haim song) =

2012 single by Haim

Single by Haim

from the album Days Are Gone
- B-side: "Send Me Down"
- Released: November 8, 2012
- Recorded: 2012
- Genre: Pop rock; indie rock
- Length: 3:52 (album version); 3:32 (radio edit)
- Label: Polydor; Neon Gold
- Songwriter(s): Alana Haim; Danielle Haim; Este Haim
- Producer(s): James Ford; Haim

Haim singles chronology
| "Forever" (2012) | "Don't Save Me" (2012) | "Falling" (2013) |

Music video
- "Don't Save Me" on YouTube

"Don't Save Me" is a song by American rock band Haim. The song was released in the United Kingdom on November 8, 2012. It was featured on their debut studio album, Days Are Gone, released in 2013. On December 23, 2012, the song entered the UK Singles Chart at number 74. On January 6, 2013, the song re-entered the UK Singles Chart at number 51, climbing to number 32 the following week. The song premiered on BBC Radio 1 as Zane Lowe's 'Hottest Record' on October 16, 2012. A music video to accompany the release of "Don't Save Me" was first released onto YouTube on November 26, 2012, at a total length of three minutes and fifty-six seconds. On November 23, 2013, the band performed the song on Saturday Night Live. The song impacted radio on October 14, 2014.

The 7" single was released by Neon Gold Records on December 10, 2012.

== Track listing ==
7" single and digital download

1. "Don't Save Me" – 3:52
2. "Send Me Down" – 4:19

10" single

Side A:

1. "Don't Save Me" – 3:52
2. "Send Me Down" – 4:19

Side B:

1. "Don't Save Me" – 5:17 (Cyril Hahn Remix)

== Charts ==
| Chart (2012–13) | Peak position |
|---|---|
| Australia (ARIA) | 66 |
| Belgium (Ultratop 50 Flanders) | 28 |
| Ireland (IRMA) | 70 |
| Scotland (OCC) | 32 |
| Switzerland Airplay (Schweizer Hitparade) | 61 |
| UK Singles (OCC) | 32 |

== Certifications ==
| Region | Certification | Certified units/sales |
|---|---|---|
| Australia (ARIA) | Gold | 35,000^{^} |
^{^} Shipments figures based on certification alone.
