= The Wire (Haim song) =

Single by Haim

from the album Days Are Gone
- Released: August 9, 2013
- Recorded: 2012
- Genre: Rock; soft rock; R&B
- Length: 4:05 (album); 3:36 (radio edit)
- Label: Polydor
- Songwriters: Alana Haim; Danielle Haim; Este Haim
- Producers: Ariel Rechtshaid; Alana Haim; Danielle Haim; Este Haim

Haim singles chronology
| "Falling" (2013) | "The Wire" (2013) | "If I Could Change Your Mind" (2014) |

Music video
- "The Wire" on YouTube

"The Wire" is the fourth single from American rock band Haim's debut studio album, Days Are Gone (2013), released in the United Kingdom on September 22, 2013. The song had previously been released on US radio on September 17, 2013. The song peaked at number 16 in the UK Singles Chart, and at number 25 in the Billboard Hot Rock Songs. It also went platinum in Australia, and featured at number 11 in radio station Triple J's Hottest 100 Countdown of 2013. The song ranked highly at number 6 on Pitchfork Top 100 Tracks of 2013 list. and at number 91 on Pitchfork 200 Best Songs of the 2010s list. It was number 16 on Rolling Stone magazine's 100 Best Songs of 2013 list. A music video to accompany the release of "The Wire" was first released onto YouTube on August 12, 2013, at a total length of four minutes and fourteen seconds. The video features an appearance from comedian Jorma Taccone.

== Track listing ==
Digital download
| No. | Title | Length |
|---|---|---|
| 1. | "The Wire" | 4:05 |

== Chart performance ==
=== Weekly charts ===
| Chart (2013) | Peak position |
|---|---|
| Australia (ARIA) | 12 |
| Belgium (Ultratip Bubbling Under Flanders) | 6 |
| Ireland (IRMA) | 26 |
| Japan Hot 100 (Billboard) | 56 |
| New Zealand (Recorded Music NZ) | 17 |
| Scottish Singles Sales (Official Charts) | 17 |
| Switzerland Airplay (Schweizer Hitparade) | 87 |
| UK Singles (Official Charts) | 16 |
| US Hot Rock & Alternative Songs (Billboard) | 25 |

=== Year-end charts ===
| Chart (2014) | Position |
|---|---|
| US Hot Rock Songs (Billboard) | 79 |

== Certifications ==
| Region | Certification | Certified units/sales |
|---|---|---|
| Australia (ARIA) | Platinum | 70,000^{^} |
| Canada (Music Canada) | Gold | 40,000^{‡} |
| New Zealand (RMNZ) | Platinum | 15,000^{*} |
| United Kingdom (BPI) | Gold | 400,000^{‡} |
| United States (RIAA) | Platinum | 1,000,000^{‡} |
^{*} Sales figures based on certification alone.^{^} Shipments figures based on certification alone.^{‡} Sales+streaming figures based on certification alone.

== Release history ==
| Region | Date | Format | Label |
|---|---|---|---|
| Australia | August 9, 2013 | Digital download | Polydor |
| United Kingdom | September 22, 2013 | Digital download | Polydor |

== In popular culture ==
- The song appears in the first episode ("Gone But Not Forgotten") of season two of Bates Motel.
- The song appears in the sixth episode ("Dissolution") of season three of Revenge.
- The song appears in the 2014 film Vampire Academy.
- The song appears in the first episode ("300") of season fourteen of Criminal Minds.
- The song appears in the trailer of the 2017 film Home Again.
