= Mordechai Haim =

Israeli footballer (born 1954)

Mordechai Haim מרדכי חיים (Hebrew)
Personal information
- Full name: Mordechai "Moti" Haim
- Date of birth: 1954 (age 71–72)
- Place of birth: Israel

Youth career
- Maccabi Jaffa

Senior career*
Years	Team	Apps	(Gls)
- Maccabi Jaffa
- Maccabi Los Angeles
- Maccabi Jaffa
- * Club domestic league appearances and goals

Mordechai "Moti" Haim (Hebrew: מרדכי "מוטי" חיים) is an Israeli former footballer, musician and actor who played for Maccabi Jaffa and Maccabee Los Angeles. He is the father of all three members of the music trio Haim.

== Early life ==
Haim was born in 1954. He grew up on Jerusalem Boulevard in Jaffa, Israel. He started playing for Maccabi Jaffa's youth team at the age of 10.

== Career ==
Haim started playing for Maccabi Jaffa's senior team and became a regular player. Highlights of his career include playing in the UEFA Intertoto Cup in 1977.

He completed military service with the Israel Defense Forces, where he was a drummer in an IDF band. He later joined the famous 'Tzadikov Choir' as a drummer, performing alongside Oshik Levi. After this, Haim moved to Maccabee Los Angeles, which was at that time a semi-professional team. After two years in LA, he returned to Israel and again played for Maccabi Jaffa.

Haim relocated to the United States permanently in 1980.

Haim was a member of a band, Rockinhaim, with his wife Donna and their three daughters. Their three daughters went on to form the band Haim. The couple later went into real estate together in Los Angeles.

In 2021, he made his acting debut in Paul Thomas Anderson's Licorice Pizza, where he played the father of Alana, played by his own daughter Alana Haim.

== Honours ==
- Israeli Premier League - Runner-up: 1976–77

== Personal life ==
He is the father of Este Haim (b. 1986), Danielle Haim (b. 1989), and Alana Haim (b. 1991), who went on to form the Los Angeles-based pop rock band Haim. His maternal family is of Bulgarian-Jewish descent.
