= My Song 5 =

- Cover for the remix featuring A$AP Ferg

Single by Haim featuring A$AP Ferg

from the album Days Are Gone
- Released: August 15, 2014
- Recorded: 2013
- Genre: Indie rock; noise pop; alternative hip-hop (remix)
- Length: 3:44
- Label: Polydor
- Songwriter(s): Haim; Ariel Rechtshaid
- Producer(s): Haim; Ariel Rechtshaid

Haim singles chronology
"If I Could Change Your Mind" (2014)	"My Song 5" (2014)	"Pray to God" (2015)

A$AP Ferg singles chronology
"Doe-Active" (2014)	"My Song 5" (2014)	"B Boy" (2015)

"My Song 5" is the sixth and final single from American pop rock band Haim's debut studio album, Days Are Gone (2013). A re-recorded version of the song, featuring rapper A$AP Ferg, was released as a single on August 15, 2014. A music video for the song was released four days later. On October 3, 2014, Haim posted a cover version by the Australian rock band Movement on their SoundCloud account to celebrate the first anniversary of the release of Days Are Gone.

== Release ==
"My Song 5" was released on October 6, 2014 on a 10" picture disc vinyl.

== Music video ==
The music video for "My Song 5" was released on August 19, 2014. The video is set on a fictional talk show called Dallas Murphy (a parody of Jerry Springer and the original Ricki Lake show), featuring Haim and several other people playing roles. The show is hosted by Vanessa Bayer, and includes cameos from various other celebrities—Ezra Koenig from Vampire Weekend, Kesha, Big Sean, Grimes, A$AP Ferg, and Ariel Rechtshaid.

== In popular culture ==
The song was featured in the teaser trailers for the second season of the MTV drama Finding Carter.

The U2 song "Lights of Home" borrows the main riff of "My Song 5" with songwriting credited to U2 and HAIM.

== Charts ==
Chart (2014–2015)	Peak position
Mexico Ingles Airplay (Billboard)	37
UK Singles (Official Charts Company)	183
US Hot Singles Sales (Billboard)	10
