= Days Are Gone =

Studio album by Haim
- Released: September 27, 2013
- Studio: Sunset Sound (Hollywood, California) (Note: Tracks 1 and 6); Heavy Duty (Burbank, California) (Note: Track 1); Sear Sound (New York City); Downtown (New York City); Hyperion Sound (Los Angeles, California) (Note: Tracks 2 and 9); Vox (Los Angeles, California) (Note: Tracks 3, 5, 7, 8 and 10); The Bank (Burbank, California) (Note: Tracks 3–5, 8, 10 and 11); The Premises (London) (Note: Track 6); Box (New York City) (Note: Track 11)
- Genre: Pop rock; indie pop; indie rock; soft rock
- Length: 44:14
- Label: Polydor
- Producer: James Ford; Ludwig Göransson; Alana Haim; Danielle Haim; Este Haim; Ariel Rechtshaid

Haim chronology
Spotify Sessions (2013)	Days Are Gone (2013)	Something to Tell You (2017)

Singles from Days Are Gone
- 1. "Forever" Released: October 12, 2012; 2. "Don't Save Me" Released: November 8, 2012; 3. "Falling" Released: February 12, 2013; 4. "The Wire" Released: August 9, 2013; 5. "If I Could Change Your Mind" Released: March 21, 2014; 6. "My Song 5" Released: August 15, 2014

Days Are Gone is the debut studio album by American pop rock band Haim, released on September 27, 2013, by Polydor Records. The album spawned six singles: "Forever", "Don't Save Me", "Falling", "The Wire", "If I Could Change Your Mind", and "My Song 5".

The album was recognized as one of "The 100 Best Albums of the Decade So Far" by Pitchfork in August 2014.

== Background ==
The three women grew up in the San Fernando Valley, listening to the 1970s classic rock and Americana records of their music-loving parents. While they were still at school their parents formed a family band called Rockinhaim to play cover versions at local charity fairs, with Israeli-born father Mordechai ("Moti") on drums and mother Donna on guitar. Danielle and Este were members of the Valli Girls, an all-female band from Southern California that was signed to Columbia Records. Their song "Always There in You" was included on the soundtrack to the 2005 film The Sisterhood of the Traveling Pants, while "Valli Nation" appeared on the 2005 Kids' Choice Awards soundtrack. Shortly after the band's appearance at the 2005 Kids' Choice Awards, Este and Danielle opted out of their contracts.

As they grew older, the girls became more interested in incorporating pop and contemporary R&B into their music. In 2006 they decided to form their own band. For the next five years, Haim played local venues, but did not take things further as all three sisters were busy with other projects. Este was studying at UCLA and graduated in 2010 with a degree in Ethnomusicology, completed in two years instead of the customary five. Upon graduating from high school Danielle was asked to play drums for the opening act on one of Jenny Lewis's tours, which led to Lewis asking Danielle to be her guitarist on the following tour. The Strokes' singer Julian Casablancas came to see one of Lewis's shows on that tour, and he in turn asked Danielle to play guitar and percussion on his own solo tour. She has also toured as part of Scarlet Fever, the all-female backing band for CeeLo Green. It was after Danielle had played with other artists and Este had graduated that the sisters decided that they wanted pursue their career as Haim more seriously. Youngest sister Alana spent one year in college before dropping out to join the band with her sisters.

Having played shows supporting artists such as Edward Sharpe and the Magnetic Zeros, the Henry Clay People, and Kesha, Haim's first release was a three-song EP titled Forever which was made available on February 10, 2012, as a free download on their website for a brief period. The EP received a lot of attention from the music press and the general public, and following a successful gig at the South by Southwest festival in March 2012 Haim signed a deal with Polydor Records in the United Kingdom in June 2012. In July 2012 independent record label National Anthem released the Forever EP on 10-inch vinyl, containing the original three songs along with a fourth track, a remix of "Forever" by Dan Lissvik. All songs on the Forever EP were included on Days Are Gone, except for "Better Off". Following dates supporting Mumford & Sons on their "Gentlemen of the Road" tour in the US in August 2012, Haim made their debut tour of the UK in November 2012 and then supported Florence and the Machine on their UK and Ireland tour in December 2012.

== Composition ==
Writers for PopMatters found the album to be heavily indebted to music from the 1980s, particularly artists Laura Branigan and Taylor Dayne. Jason Mendelsohn from the publication cited influences from a wide variety of genres such as yacht rock, mid-90s R&B, and hip-hop.

== Singles ==
"Forever" was released as the lead single from the album on October 12, 2012. It peaked at No. 75 on the UK Singles Chart.

"Don't Save Me" was released as the second single from the album on November 8, 2012. It reached No. 32 on the UK Singles Chart, as well as No. 66 in Australia, No. 28 in Belgium (Flanders region), and No. 70 on the Irish Singles Chart.

"Falling" (co-written by Morgan Nagler) was released as the third single from the album on February 12, 2013. It peaked at No. 30 on the UK Singles Chart and No. 86 in Australia.

"The Wire" was released as the fourth single from the album on August 9, 2013. It peaked at No. 12 in Australia and No. 16 on the UK Singles Chart.

"If I Could Change Your Mind" was released as the fifth single from the album on March 21, 2014. It reached No. 27 on the UK Singles Chart.

"My Song 5" was released as the sixth and final single from the album on August 15, 2014.

== Critical reception ==
Professional ratings
Aggregate scores
Source	Rating
AnyDecentMusic?	7.4/10
Metacritic	79/100
Review scores
Source	Rating
AllMusic	4/5 stars
The A.V. Club	A−
The Guardian	4/5 stars
The Independent	3/5 stars
Los Angeles Times	3.5/4 stars
Mojo	4/5 stars
NME	8/10
Pitchfork	8.3/10
Rolling Stone	3.5/5 stars
Spin	8/10

Days Are Gone received acclaim from music critics upon release. At Metacritic, which assigns a normalized rating out of 100 to reviews from mainstream publications, the album received an average score of 79, based on 35 reviews. Ann Powers from NPR stated "HAIM's thoughtful, playful music is good for the radio, good for rock, and good for music lovers of all ages who need to carve out a little space to dream." Becca James of The A.V. Club gave the album a very positive review: "It could be an overstatement to say that if Days Are Gone is any indication of what's to come for Haim, the band is set." Matt James of PopMatters complimented all overall production, stating, "It'd be hard to truly dislike Haim. They're an eminently likeable, albeit slightly kooky, trio whose story already bears the frisson of legend. Three multi-talented siblings—Danielle, Alana and Este—who were baptised in the dark arts of rock 'n' roll by their own parents" and added [...] "It's not revolutionary, life-changing 'high art' but right here, right now Haim's sassy, enthusiastic, 'one for all' joie de vivre feels freshly invigorating, infectious ...basically, a drop o' the good stuff."

Jon Caramanica of The New York Times hailed the synthesized and the hooked production and compared the girls to the early years of Madonna, Pat Benatar, Sheena Easton and Laura Branigan: "There's the slightly sinister bubblyness of early Madonna, the erotic power of Pat Benatar, the breathlessness of Sheena Easton or Laura Branigan", and continued, "Haim lashes all of these together with force and glee, a rapturous throwback. Days Are Gone is as convincing as any major-label rock album this year, especially its first half, which is slick, confident and winningly breezy." Jody Rosen of Vulture praised the album's fusion of "everything from the Doobie Brothers to Janet Jackson to third-wave feminism" combined with "catchy four-minute-long songs." Jon Dolan of Rolling Stone wrote that it "recalls the dancy side of Eighties Top 40 radio as an AstroTurf Eden of chewy synths, neon-cheese guitar quake and slick, airy melodies." In a less enthusiastic review, Andy Gill of The Independent felt that the band has an "insubstantiality at their core." Philip Matusavage of musicOMH gave a mixed review, commenting, "Stretched to album length, Haim's shtick grows repetitive and the music is too frequently solid rather than inspired".

=== Accolades ===
Stereogum ranked Days Are Gone at No. 8 on their "The 50 Best Albums of 2013" list, stating: "On their debut album, [Haim] bring Stevie Nicks float, Michael Jackson glide, and Debbie Gibson twinkle to the table, subsuming them all into the massive force of their collective personality. They're not indie, but if they were, indie would be lucky to have them."

Accolades for Days Are Gone
Publication	Accolade	Rank	Ref.
American Songwriter	Top 50 Albums of 2013	25	
The A.V. Club	The 23 Best Albums of 2013	2	
Complex	The 50 Best Albums of 2013	7	
Consequence of Sound	Top 50 Albums of 2013	11	
Gazeta Wyborcza	10 Best Foreign Albums of 2013	10	
Magnet	Top 25 Albums of 2013	24	
Mojo	Top 50 Albums of 2013	43	
NME	50 Best Albums of 2013	25	
Paste	The 50 Best Albums of 2013	10	
Pitchfork	The 50 Best Albums of 2013	17	
Pitchfork	The 100 Best Albums of 2010–2014	64	
PopMatters	The 75 Best Albums of 2013	9	
Q	50 Albums of the Year	10	
Rolling Stone	50 Best Albums of 2013	31	
Spin	50 Best Albums of 2013	4	
Stereogum	The 50 Best Albums of 2013	8	
Time Out	50 Best Albums of 2013	23	
Uncut	Top 50 Albums of 2013	38	

== Commercial performance ==
Days Are Gone entered the Billboard 200 at number six with first-week sales of 26,000 copies. The album debuted at number one on the UK Albums Chart, selling 37,005 copies in its first week. On October 25, 2013, the album was certified silver by the British Phonographic Industry (BPI), denoting shipments of over 60,000 copies in the UK, and on December 27, 2013, was certified gold denoting shipments of over 100,000 copies. As of July 2017, the album had sold 300,244 copies in the United Kingdom.

== Track listing ==
No.	Title	Writer(s)	Producer(s)	Length
1.	"Falling"	Este Haim; Danielle Haim; Alana Haim; Morgan Nagler^{[a]}	Ariel Rechtshaid; D. Haim; A. Haim; E. Haim	4:17
2.	"Forever"	E. Haim; D. Haim; A. Haim	Ludwig Göransson; D. Haim; A. Haim; E. Haim; Rechtshaid^{[b]}	4:05
3.	"The Wire"	E. Haim; D. Haim; A. Haim	Rechtshaid; D. Haim; A. Haim; E. Haim	4:05
4.	"If I Could Change Your Mind"	E. Haim; D. Haim; A. Haim; James Ford	Ford; D. Haim; A. Haim; E. Haim	3:50
5.	"Honey & I"	E. Haim; D. Haim; A. Haim	Rechtshaid; D. Haim; A. Haim; E. Haim	4:11
6.	"Don't Save Me"	E. Haim; D. Haim; A. Haim	Ford; D. Haim; A. Haim; E. Haim	3:51
7.	"Days Are Gone"	E. Haim; D. Haim; A. Haim; Jessie Ware; Kid Harpoon	Rechtshaid; D. Haim; A. Haim; E. Haim	3:33
8.	"My Song 5"	E. Haim; D. Haim; A. Haim; Rechtshaid	Rechtshaid; D. Haim; A. Haim; E. Haim	3:53
9.	"Go Slow"	E. Haim; D. Haim; A. Haim	Göransson; D. Haim; A. Haim; E. Haim; Rechtshaid^{[b]}	4:17
10.	"Let Me Go"	E. Haim; D. Haim; A. Haim	Rechtshaid; D. Haim; A. Haim; E. Haim	4:08
11.	"Running If You Call My Name"	E. Haim; D. Haim; A. Haim; Rechtshaid	Rechtshaid; D. Haim; A. Haim; E. Haim	4:04
Total length:				44:14

UK digital deluxe edition bonus tracks
No.	Title	Writer(s)	Producer(s)	Length
12.	"Send Me Down"	E. Haim; D. Haim; A. Haim	Ford; D. Haim; A. Haim; E. Haim	4:18
13.	"Edge"	E. Haim; D. Haim; A. Haim; George Lewis Jr.	Ford; D. Haim; A. Haim; E. Haim	3:39
14.	"Falling" (Duke Dumont Remix)	E. Haim; D. Haim; A. Haim; Nagler^{[a]}	Rechtshaid; D. Haim; A. Haim; E. Haim; Tommy Forrest^{[b]}; Duke Dumont^{[c]}	5:36
15.	"Go Slow" (demo)	E. Haim; D. Haim; A. Haim		2:45

Japanese edition bonus tracks
No.	Title	Writer(s)	Producer(s)	Length
12.	"Send Me Down"	E. Haim; D. Haim; A. Haim	Ford; D. Haim; A. Haim; E. Haim	4:19
13.	"Edge"	E. Haim; D. Haim; A. Haim; Lewis	Ford; D. Haim; A. Haim; E. Haim	3:37
14.	"Falling" (Duke Dumont Remix) (digital edition only)	E. Haim; D. Haim; A. Haim; Nagler^{[a]}	Rechtshaid; D. Haim; A. Haim; E. Haim; Forrest^{[b]}; Duke Dumont^{[c]}	5:35
15.	"Go Slow" (demo)	E. Haim; D. Haim; A. Haim		2:45
16.	"Send Me Down" (Dan Lissvik Remix)	E. Haim; D. Haim; A. Haim	Ford; D. Haim; A. Haim; E. Haim; Lissvik^{[c]}	4:33
17.	"Forever" (Huebschmann/Sikora Remix)	E. Haim; D. Haim; A. Haim	Göransson; D. Haim; A. Haim; E. Haim; Rechtshaid^{[b]}; Heiko Huebschmann^{[c]}; Sikora^{[c]}	3:33

Deluxe edition bonus disc
No.	Title	Writer(s)	Producer(s)	Length
1.	"Better Off"	E. Haim; D. Haim; A. Haim	Göransson; D. Haim; A. Haim; E. Haim	3:36
2.	"Forever" (Dan Lissvik Remix)	E. Haim; D. Haim; A. Haim	Göransson; D. Haim; A. Haim; E. Haim; Lissvik^{[c]}	4:00
3.	"Send Me Down"	E. Haim; D. Haim; A. Haim	Ford; D. Haim; A. Haim; E. Haim	4:18
4.	"Don't Save Me" (Cyril Hahn Remix)	E. Haim; D. Haim; A. Haim	Ford; D. Haim; A. Haim; E. Haim; Cyril Hahn^{[c]}	5:16
5.	"Falling" (live at the iTunes Festival 2012)	E. Haim; D. Haim; A. Haim; Nagler^{[a]}		5:19
6.	"Falling" (Duke Dumont Remix)	E. Haim; D. Haim; A. Haim; Nagler^{[a]}	Rechtshaid; D. Haim; A. Haim; E. Haim; Forrest^{[b]}; Duke Dumont^{[c]}	5:34
7.	"Falling" (Psychemagik Remix)	E. Haim; D. Haim; A. Haim; Nagler^{[a]}	Rechtshaid; D. Haim; A. Haim; E. Haim; Psychemagik^{[c]}	5:54
8.	"The Wire" (Tourist Remix)	E. Haim; D. Haim; A. Haim	Rechtshaid; D. Haim; A. Haim; E. Haim; Tourist^{[c]}	4:55

=== Notes ===
- ^{^[a]} signifies an additional lyricist
- ^{^[b]} signifies an additional producer
- ^{^[c]} signifies a remixer

== Personnel ==
Credits adapted from the liner notes of Days Are Gone.

=== Haim ===
- Danielle Haim – guitar, vocals, drums (all tracks); percussion (tracks 1, 2, 5, 6, 9)
- Alana Haim – guitar (tracks 1, 2, 4–11); piano (tracks 1, 7, 11); synthesizer (tracks 1–4, 7–9); percussion (tracks 1, 6); vocals (all tracks); keyboards (tracks 2, 6, 8–10)
- Este Haim – bass, vocals (all tracks); percussion (tracks 1, 6)

=== Additional musicians ===
- Ariel Rechtshaid – synthesizer (tracks 1, 3, 5, 7, 8, 11); programming (tracks 1, 3, 7, 8); guitar (track 1); backing vocals (tracks 1, 3, 7); Simmons drums (tracks 5, 11); Rhodes (track 8); mbira, noise (track 10)
- Will Canzoneri – clavinet, Rhodes (track 1)
- James Ford – keyboards (track 4); percussion (tracks 4, 6); guitar (track 6)
- Jamie Muhoberac – additional keyboards (track 7)
- Greg Leisz – pedal steel guitar (track 11)

=== Technical ===
- Ariel Rechtshaid – production, engineering (tracks 1, 3, 5, 7, 8, 10, 11); additional production, additional engineering (tracks 2, 9)
- Danielle Haim – production (all tracks)
- Alana Haim – production (all tracks)
- Este Haim – production (all tracks)
- Ludwig Göransson – production (tracks 2, 9)
- James Ford – production (tracks 4, 6)
- David Schiffman – engineering (tracks 1, 3, 5, 7, 8, 10, 11)
- Nick Rowe – additional engineering (tracks 1–3, 5, 7–11)
- Jimmy Robertson – engineering (track 4)
- Morgan Stratton – engineering (track 6)
- Mark "Spike" Stent – mixing (tracks 2–4, 7, 10, 11)
- Geoff Swan – mixing assistance (tracks 2–4, 7, 10, 11)
- Dave Emery – mixing assistance (tracks 2–4, 7, 10, 11)
- Tom Elmhirst – mixing (tracks 1, 6)
- Ben Baptie – mixing assistance (tracks 1, 6)
- Manny Marroquin – mixing (track 8)
- Chris Galland – mixing assistance (track 8)
- Delbert Bowers – mixing assistance (track 8)
- Rich Costey – mixing (track 5)
- Chris Kasych – mix engineering (track 5)
- Nicolas Fournier – mix engineering (track 5)
- Martin Cooke – mix engineering (track 5)
- Bo Hill – engineering assistance (track 5)
- Heiko Huebschmann – mixing (track 9)
- Emily Lazar – mastering (all tracks)
- Rich Morales – mastering assistance (all tracks)

=== Artwork ===
- Big Active – design
- Marek Polewski – design
- Pierre Auroux – photography
- Tom Beard – photography

== Charts ==
=== Weekly charts ===
Weekly chart performance for Days Are Gone
Chart (2013)	Peak position
Australian Albums (ARIA)	2
Austrian Albums (Ö3 Austria)	44
Belgian Albums (Ultratop Flanders)	9
Belgian Albums (Ultratop Wallonia)	72
Canadian Albums (Billboard)	7
Danish Albums (Hitlisten)	18
Dutch Albums (Album Top 100)	32
French Albums (SNEP)	134
German Albums (Offizielle Top 100)	30
Irish Albums (IRMA)	4
Japanese Albums (Oricon)	61
New Zealand Albums (RMNZ)	12
Norwegian Albums (VG-lista)	5
Scottish Albums (OCC)	2
Spanish Albums (PROMUSICAE)	56
Swedish Albums (Sverigetopplistan)	39
Swiss Albums (Schweizer Hitparade)	35
UK Albums (OCC)	1
US Billboard 200	6
US Top Alternative Albums (Billboard)	2
US Top Rock Albums (Billboard)	2

=== Year-end charts ===
2013 year-end chart performance for Days Are Gone
Chart (2013)	Position
Australian Albums (ARIA)	86
Belgian Albums (Ultratop Flanders)	136
UK Albums (OCC)	84

2014 year-end chart performance for Days Are Gone
Chart (2014)	Position
UK Albums (OCC)	54
US Billboard 200	169
US Top Alternative Albums (Billboard)	29
US Top Rock Albums (Billboard)	35

== Certifications ==
Certifications for Days Are Gone
Region	Certification	Certified units/sales
Australia (ARIA)	Platinum	70,000^{‡}
United Kingdom (BPI)	Platinum	300,244
United States (RIAA)	Gold	500,000^{‡}
^{‡} Sales+streaming figures based on certification alone.

== Release history ==
Release history for Days Are Gone
Region	Date	Label	Ref.
Australia	September 27, 2013	Universal	
Germany	September 27, 2013	Vertigo Berlin	
Ireland	September 27, 2013	Polydor	
United Kingdom	September 30, 2013	Polydor	
France	September 30, 2013	Mercury	
United States	September 30, 2013	Columbia	
Sweden	September 30, 2013	Universal	
Italy	October 1, 2013	Universal	
Japan	October 2, 2013	Universal	
