= Este Haim =

American musician (born 1986)

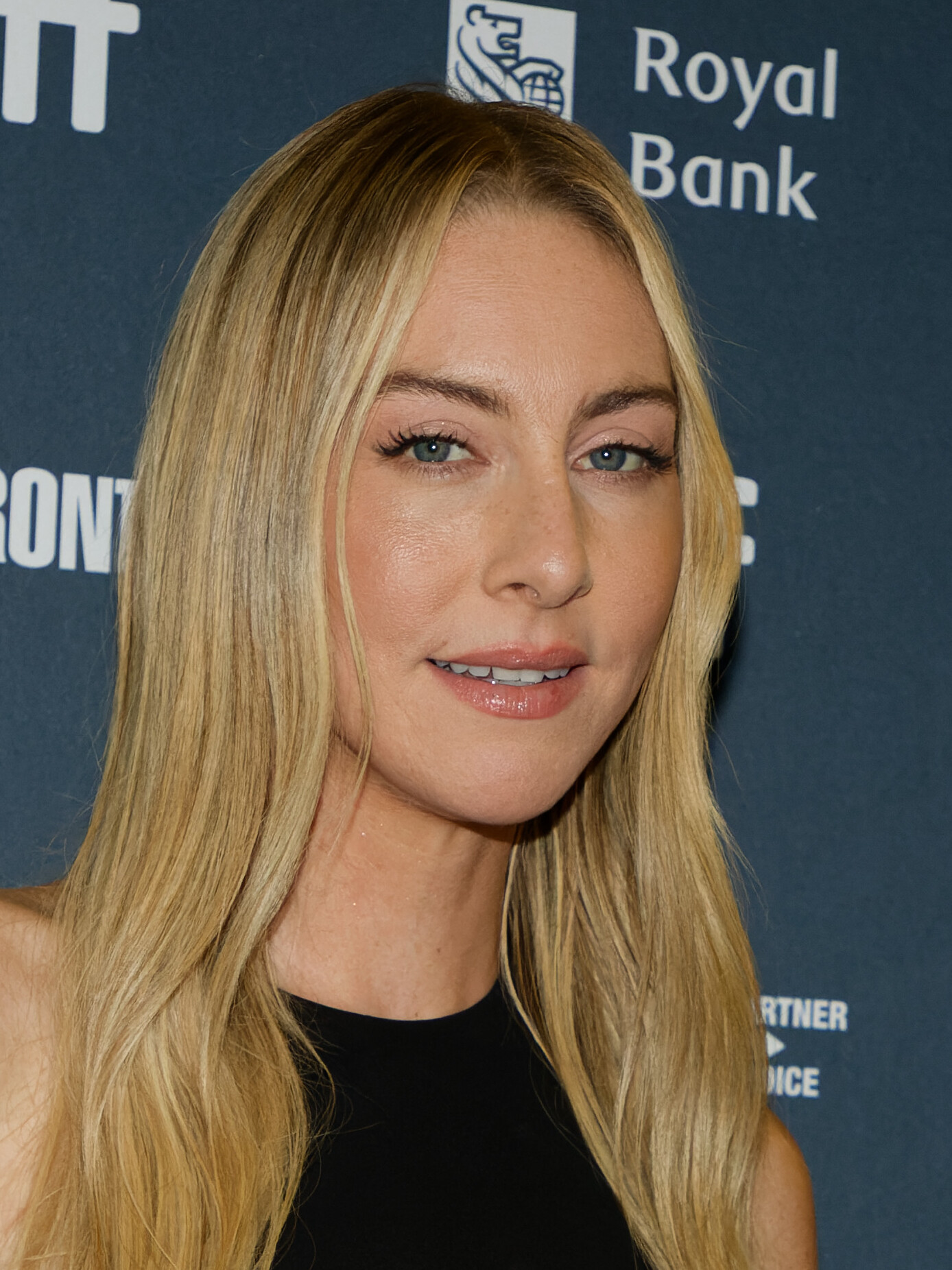
- Haim in 2024

Background information
- Born: Este Arielle Haim; March 14, 1986 (age 40); Los Angeles, California, U.S.
- Genres: Indie rock; folk rock; pop rock
- Occupations: Musician; singer; songwriter; composer; actress
- Instruments: Bass guitar; vocals
- Years active: 2004–present
- Labels: Polydor; Columbia
- Member of: Haim
- Spouse: Jonathan Levin (m. 2025)
- Website: haimtheband.com

Este Arielle Haim (/ˈɛstiː haɪ.ɪm/ ESS-tee HY-im; born March 14, 1986) is an American musician. She is the bassist and a vocalist of the pop-rock trio Haim, which she formed with her younger sisters Alana and Danielle in 2006. She co-writes all of Haim's songs.

Since 2021, Este has composed scores for film and television. She acted as a music consultant for the second season of HBO's The White Lotus. Este was also the executive music producer for the mini-series A Small Light (2023).

== Early life ==
Este grew up in the San Fernando Valley, California and studied at LA County's High School For The Arts. Her family is Jewish. Este's father, Mordechai "Moti" Haim, is an Israeli-born retired professional soccer player who moved to the United States in 1980. Her mother, Donna Rose, is a former elementary school art teacher from Philadelphia. Este's paternal grandmother was originally from Bulgaria.

The Haim sisters were taught to play instruments from an early age by their parents, with Este being encouraged to learn bass guitar by her father. She has described being influenced by bassist Tina Weymouth after her father showed her the Talking Heads concert film Stop Making Sense. Donna, Moti, and their children formed a family band, performing covers for charity gigs and at children's hospitals.

Este graduated from the University of California, Los Angeles with a degree in ethnomusicology.

== Career ==
Este formed the band Haim with her sisters Danielle and Alana in 2006. They played their first show in 2007 and released their debut extended play (EP) Falling as a free download on their website after meeting producer Ludwig Göransson. Their debut album Days Are Gone was released in 2013, followed by their second album Something to Tell You in 2017. Haim's third album Women in Music Pt. III was issued in June 2020, after the band postponed its release due to the COVID-19 pandemic. In 2025, Haim released their fourth album, I Quit.

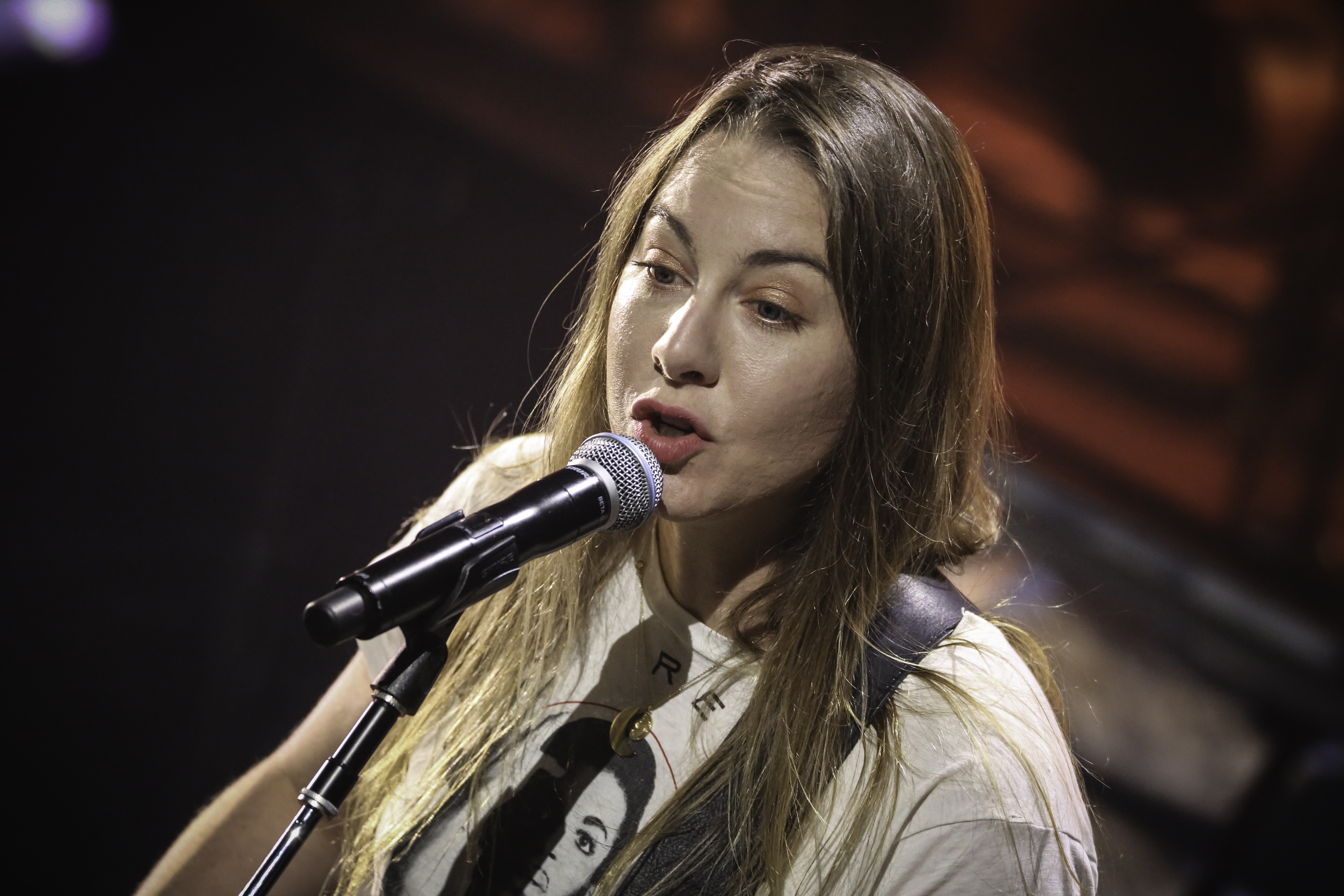
Este Haim performing in 2018

In 2021, Este composed the score for the Netflix limited series Maid. She became involved in the project through a friend who was executive producing the show. Este collaborated with Christopher Stracey, a member of the electronic duo Bag Raiders. While Christopher produced and played synth-based sounds, Este played most of the instruments. While working on the music for Maid, Este and Christopher were approached to score the film Cha Cha Real Smooth.

Este wrote original music for the Netflix teen movie Do Revenge. She collaborated with composer Amanda Yamate. Este served as music consultant for season 2 of the HBO series The White Lotus after being invited to the set by her friend Dave Bernad. Bernad executive produced the series and asked Este to work on the show after observing her interactions with actress Beatrice Grannò. In 2021, Este hosted the pop culture and music podcast That Thing I Do with actor Darren Criss. In 2022, Este appeared in the film Licorice Pizza, which also featured her sisters and parents.

In 2023, Este worked for the first time as an executive music producer on the National Geographic limited series A Small Light. Composer Ariel Marx wrote an original score for the series, with Este producing an accompanying soundtrack of cover versions of songs from the 1930s and 1940s. Contributors to the soundtrack included Danielle Haim, Angel Olsen, Remi Wolf and Weyes Blood. She and Zachary Dawes provided the original musical score for George Jacques' film, Sunny Dancer. In 2026, she again collaborated with Amanda Yamate to score the Netflix series Voicemails For Isabel.

== Personal life ==
Este was diagnosed with Type 1 diabetes at age fourteen, during her first year of high school. In interviews, she has discussed the challenges of managing diabetes as a touring musician. When the band first performed at Glastonbury Festival, Este fainted after taking insulin when she had not had an opportunity to eat. In 2018, Este was diagnosed with stage 3 kidney disease. She has since started wearing a continuous glucose monitor, which she credits with transforming how she manages her diabetes.

In February 2025, her engagement to Chainalysis co-founder and CEO Jonathan Levin was announced. Haim and Levin got married in Ojai, California on December 31, 2025, New Year's Eve.

== Artistry ==
Este is a multi-instrumentalist who plays bass guitar, drums and guitar. Este's main instrument is a 1975 Fender Precision Bass. Her first bass was a Fender Jazz Precision, which she purchased herself after saving up her allowance. Este prefers to play without a pick and rarely uses effects. Bass Magazine described her style as diverse, "which allows her to both play for the song and play for the bass, at all times".

== Cultural influence ==
Este is referenced in the Taylor Swift song "No Body, No Crime", on which she is also a featured artist providing background vocals. The song tells the story of avenging Este's murder. Swift named the song's character after her because she knew that she would be excited to be included in a murder-mystery track.

== Discography ==
=== Haim ===
- Days Are Gone (2013)
- Something to Tell You (2017)
- Women in Music Pt. III (2020)
- I Quit (2025)

=== As composer ===
- Maid (2021)
- Cha Cha Real Smooth (2022)
- Do Revenge (2022)
- You Are So Not Invited to My Bat Mitzvah (2023)
- Anyone But You (2023); co-composed with Chris Stracey
- Suncoast (2024)
- Tow (2025)
- Voicemails for Isabelle (2026)
- One Night Only (2026)

== Filmography ==
=== Film ===
Year	Title	Role	Notes	Ref.
2021	Licorice Pizza	Este		
2024	Shell	Lydia		
2026	One Night Only	Aura		
2026	Spidey and the Avengers: Halloween Team-Up!	Hallows' Eve (voice)	TV special	
