= Alana Haim =

American musician and actress (born 1991)

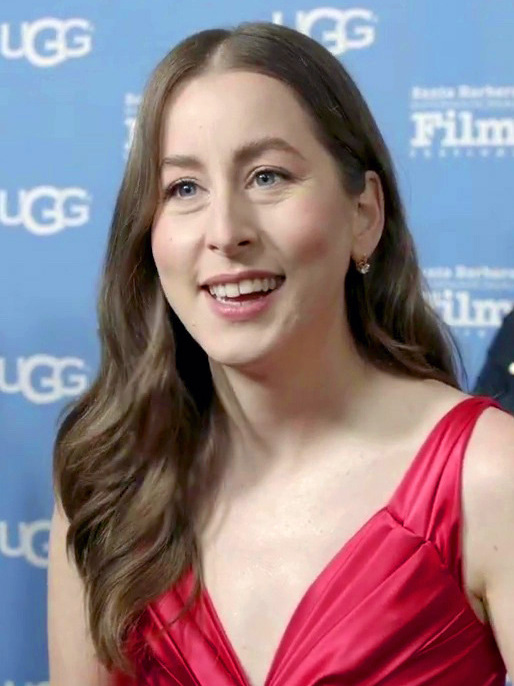
- Haim in 2022
- Born: Alana Mychal Haim; December 15, 1991 (age 34); Los Angeles, California, U.S.
- Occupations: Singer; songwriter; actress
- Father: Moti Haim
- Relatives: Este Haim (sister); Danielle Haim (sister)
- Musical career
- Genres: Indie rock; folk rock; pop rock
- Instruments: Vocals; guitar; keyboards
- Years active: 2007–present
- Labels: Polydor; Columbia
- Member of: Haim
- Website: haimtheband.com

Alana Mychal Haim (/əˈlɑːnə haɪ.ɪm/ ə-LAH-nə HY-im; born December 15, 1991) is an American musician and actress. She is a member of the pop rock band Haim, along with her older sisters Este and Danielle, and performs piano, guitar and vocals. Alana has been nominated for five Grammy Awards. She starred in Paul Thomas Anderson's comedy-drama film Licorice Pizza (2021), for which she was nominated for a Golden Globe Award for Best Actress – Motion Picture Comedy or Musical and a BAFTA Award for Best Actress in a Leading Role. In 2025, Alana appeared in the acclaimed films The Mastermind and One Battle After Another. In 2026, she portrayed Rachel in the movie The Drama.

== Early life ==
Alana Mychal Haim was born on December 15, 1991, in Los Angeles to a Jewish family. Her father, Mordechai "Moti" Haim, is an Israeli-born retired professional soccer player who moved to the United States in 1980. Her mother, Donna Rose, is a former elementary school art teacher from Philadelphia. Alana's paternal grandmother was originally from Bulgaria. She has two older sisters, Este (born 1986) and Danielle (born 1989).

Alana was raised in the San Fernando Valley in a musical family. Her father was a drummer in a choir group; her mother was a folk singer, and a winning contestant on The Gong Show in the 1970s. They taught their young daughters to play various instruments, with Alana picking up percussion at the age of four. Growing up, the siblings were encouraged to listen to their parents' classic rock and Americana records, though they also developed their own liking of '90s R&B. The family eventually formed a band, Rockinhaim, and played their first rock concert at Los Angeles' Canter's Deli in 2000, with Moti on drums and Donna on vocals. They performed '70s and '80s rock covers every few months in the next decade, mostly at local fairs and fundraisers.

Alana attended Los Angeles County High School for the Arts and graduated in 2010. She briefly attended Los Angeles Valley College before dropping out to focus on her music career.

== Career ==
=== Haim ===
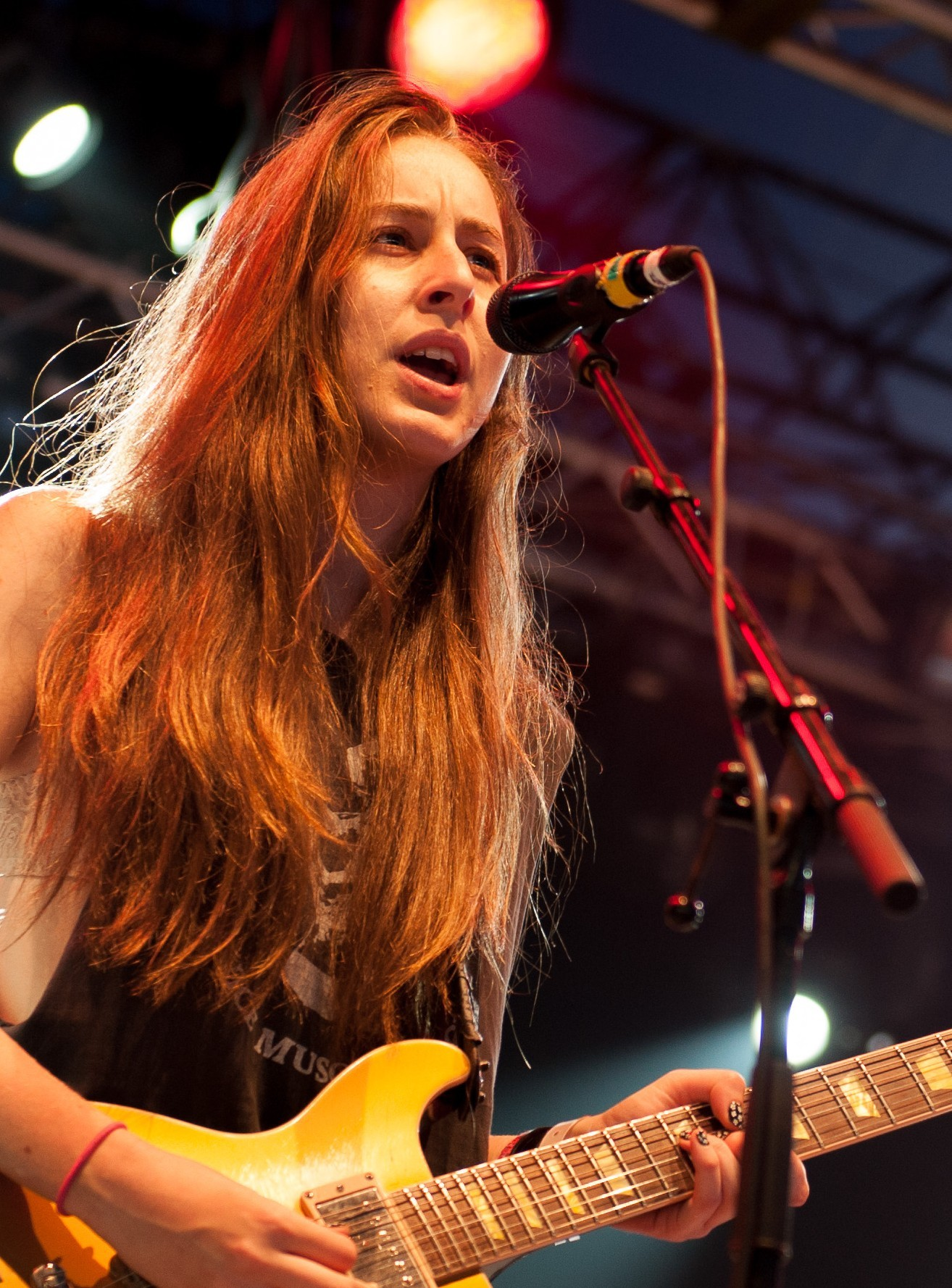
Alana Haim performing in 2013

In 2007, Alana and her sisters formed the band Haim and released their EP Forever in 2012. They have appeared at many music festivals, one of which brought them to the attention of artist and musician Jay-Z, who signed them to his recently founded label Roc Nation in 2012. Alana signed with Columbia Records at the end of 2012, and was a featured artist at Jay-Z's Made in America festival. Haim released their first studio album, Days Are Gone, in September 2013. It was a commercial success, and they were musical guests on Saturday Night Live. They released their second studio album, Something to Tell You, in July 2017. In June 2020, they released their third album, Women in Music, Pt. III, which was nominated for Album of the Year at the 63rd Annual Grammy Awards, with the single, "The Steps", nominated for Best Rock Performance. The album was widely featured on year-end best album lists, including those of The Guardian, NPR, Pitchfork and Stereogum.

=== Acting ===
Alana made her acting debut when she starred in Licorice Pizza, a 2021 feature film directed by Paul Thomas Anderson, who previously directed several of the band's music videos and a short documentary on the making of Something to Tell You. Licorice Pizza is set in 1973, where Alana plays opposite Cooper Hoffman, the son of Anderson's late collaborator Philip Seymour Hoffman. Reviewing the film in the Los Angeles Times, Justin Chang called Alana "the star of this boisterous, bighearted movie and its raison d'être". In The Hollywood Reporter, David Rooney praised her performance as "an incandescent presence that marks the arrival of a fully formed screen star". For her performance she was nominated for a Golden Globe Award for Best Actress – Motion Picture Comedy or Musical, a BAFTA Award for Best Actress in a Leading Role and a Critics' Choice Movie Award for Best Actress.

Alana next acted in Kelly Reichardt's heist film The Mastermind, which premiered in competition at the Cannes Film Festival in 2025. That same year, she collaborated again with Anderson, appearing in One Battle After Another. In 2026, she starred in The Drama alongside Zendaya and Robert Pattinson.

== Personal life ==
Haim lives in Los Angeles.

== Filmography ==
=== Film ===
Year	Title	Role	Notes
2017	Haim: Behind the Music	Herself	Documentary
2021	Licorice Pizza	Alana Kane	
2025	The Mastermind	Terri Mooney	
2025	One Battle After Another	Mae West	
2026	The Drama	Rachel	

=== Television ===
Year	Title	Role	Notes
2015	Documentary Now!	Herself	2 episodes
2019	The Unauthorized Bash Brothers Experience	Val Gal	Variety special
2026	Family Guy	Odette (voice)	Episode: "Tall Stewie"

== Awards and nominations ==
Year	Award	Category	Nominated work	Result	Ref.
2021	Atlanta Film Critics Circle	Best Actress	Licorice Pizza	Won	
2021	Boston Society of Film Critics	Best Actress	Licorice Pizza	Won	
2021	Chicago Film Critics Association	Best Actress	Licorice Pizza	Nominated	
2021	Chicago Film Critics Association	Most Promising Performer	Licorice Pizza	Won	
2021	Detroit Film Critics Society	Best Actress	Licorice Pizza	Nominated	
2021	Detroit Film Critics Society	Best Breakthrough Performance	Licorice Pizza	Nominated	
2021	Florida Film Critics Circle	Best Actress	Licorice Pizza	Won	
2021	Greater Western New York Film Critics Association	Breakthrough Performance	Licorice Pizza	Nominated	
2021	Indiana Film Journalists Association	Best Actress	Licorice Pizza	Nominated	
2021	Indiana Film Journalists Association	Breakout of the Year	Licorice Pizza	Nominated	
2021	IndieWire Critics Poll	Best Performance	Licorice Pizza	5th place	
2021	National Board of Review	Breakthrough Performance	Licorice Pizza	Won	
2021	Online Association of Female Film Critics	Breakthrough Performance	Licorice Pizza	Nominated	
2021	Phoenix Critics Circle	Best Actress	Licorice Pizza	Nominated	
2021	Phoenix Film Critics Society	Breakthrough Performance	Licorice Pizza	Won	
2021	Portland Critics Association	Best Female Leading Role	Licorice Pizza	Nominated	
2021	Southeastern Film Critics Association	Best Actress	Licorice Pizza	Runner-up	
2022	Alliance of Women Film Journalists	EDA Female Focus Award for Best Woman's Breakthrough Performance	Licorice Pizza	Nominated	
2022	Alliance of Women Film Journalists	EDA Special Mention Award for Most Egregious Lovers' Age Difference	Licorice Pizza	Nominated	
2022	Austin Film Critics Association	Best Actress	Licorice Pizza	Nominated	
2022	Austin Film Critics Association	The Robert R. "Bobby" McCurdy Memorial Breakthrough Artist Award	Licorice Pizza	Won	
2022	British Academy Film Awards	Best Actress in a Leading Role	Licorice Pizza	Nominated	
2022	Chicago Indie Critics	Best Actress	Licorice Pizza	Nominated	
2022	Columbus Film Critics	Best Actress	Licorice Pizza	Won	
2022	Columbus Film Critics	Breakthrough Film Artist	Licorice Pizza	Won	
2022	Critics Association of Central Florida	Best Actress	Licorice Pizza	Runner-up	
2022	Critics' Choice Awards	Best Actress	Licorice Pizza	Nominated	
2022	Denver Film Critics Society	Best Actress	Licorice Pizza	Nominated	
2022	DiscussingFilm Critics Awards	Best Debut Performance	Licorice Pizza	Runner-up	
2022	Georgia Film Critics Association	Best Actress	Licorice Pizza	Won	
2022	Georgia Film Critics Association	Breakthrough Award	Licorice Pizza	Won	
2022	Golden Globe Awards	Best Actress in a Motion Picture – Comedy or Musical	Licorice Pizza	Nominated	
2022	Houston Film Critics Society	Best Actress	Licorice Pizza	Nominated	
2022	International Cinephile Society	Breakthrough Performance	Licorice Pizza	Runner-up	
2022	Minnesota Film Critics Alliance	Best Actress	Licorice Pizza	Runner-up	
2022	Music City Film Critics Association	Best Actress	Licorice Pizza	Nominated	
2022	National Society of Film Critics	Best Actress	Licorice Pizza	3rd place	
2022	NME Awards 2022	Best Film Actor	Licorice Pizza	Won	
2022	North Carolina Film Critics	Best Actress	Licorice Pizza	Nominated	
2022	North Carolina Film Critics	Best Breakthrough Performance	Licorice Pizza	Won	
2022	Oklahoma Film Critics Circle	Best Actress	Licorice Pizza	Won	
2022	Online Film & Television Association	Best Breakthrough Performance: Female	Licorice Pizza	Won	
2022	Online Film Critics Society	Best Actress	Licorice Pizza	Nominated	
2022	San Diego Film Critics Society	Best Breakthrough Artist	Licorice Pizza	Nominated	
2022	Satellite Awards	Best Actress in a Motion Picture – Comedy or Musical	Licorice Pizza	Won	
2022	Seattle Film Critics Society	Best Actress in a Leading Role	Licorice Pizza	Nominated	
