= Danielle Haim =

American musician (born 1989)

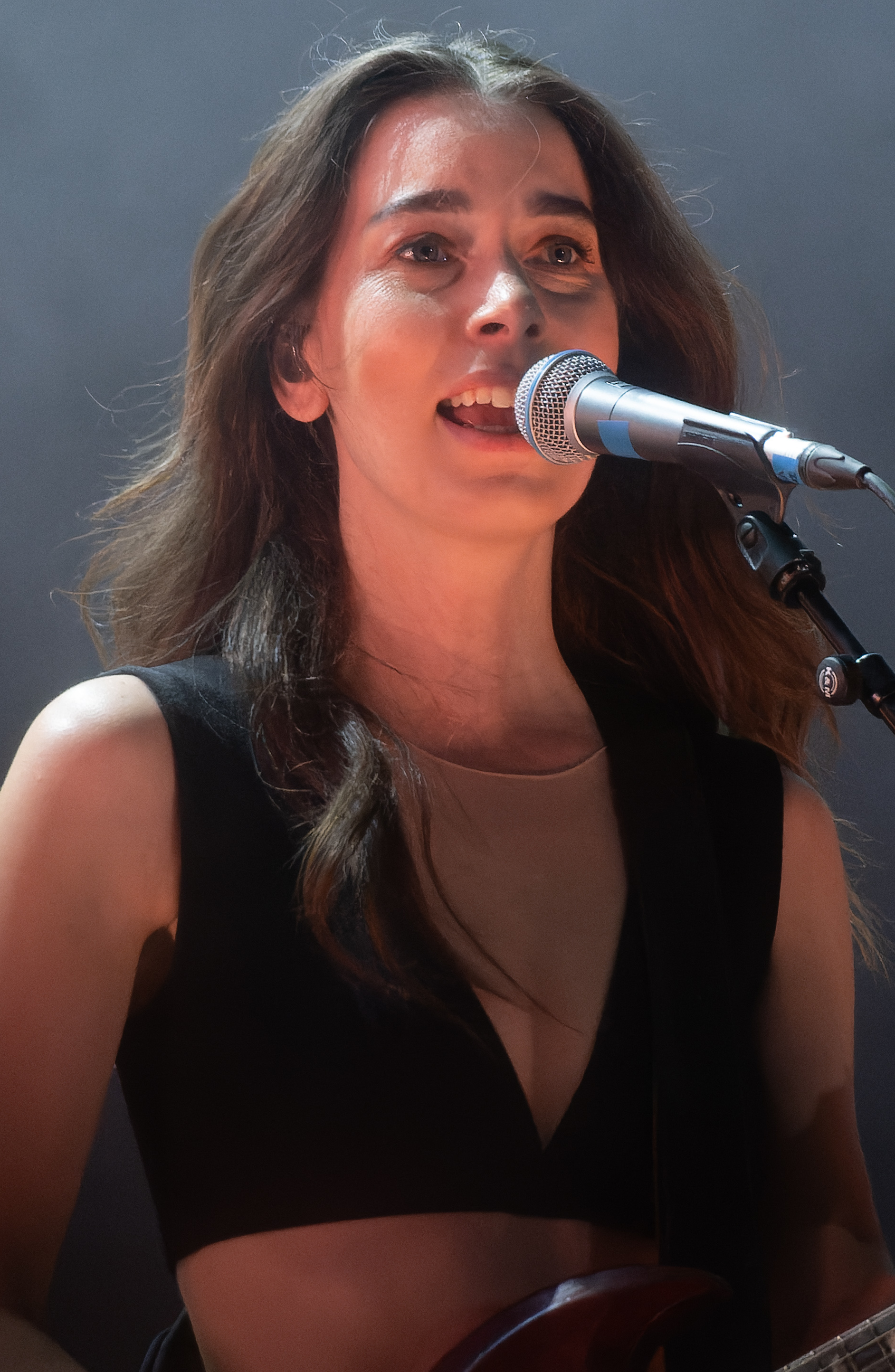
- Danielle Haim performing in London, 2023
- Born: Danielle Sari Haim; February 16, 1989 (age 37); Los Angeles, California, U.S.
- Education: Los Angeles County High School for the Arts
- Occupations: Musician; singer; songwriter
- Father: Mordechai Haim
- Relatives: Este Haim (sister); Alana Haim (sister)
- Musical career
- Genres: Indie rock; folk rock; pop rock
- Instruments: Guitar; vocals; drums
- Years active: 2004–present
- Labels: Polydor; Columbia
- Member of: Haim
- Formerly of: Valli Girls

Danielle Sari Haim (/ˈhaɪ.ɪm/ HY-im; born February 16, 1989) is an American musician. She is the lead guitarist and vocalist of the pop rock band Haim, which also consists of her two sisters, Este Haim and Alana Haim. Danielle also serves as the group's drummer in the studio; the drummer for live performances varies between Danielle and a separate drummer.

== Early life ==
Danielle Sari Haim was born and raised in the San Fernando Valley, California to a Jewish family. Her father is Israeli-born former professional soccer player Mordechai ("Moti") and her mother, Donna Rose, is a former elementary school art teacher from Philadelphia, Pennsylvania. Both of her parents have musical backgrounds; Moti played drums, while Donna won a contest on The Gong Show in the 1970s singing a Bonnie Raitt song. Danielle's paternal grandmother was originally from Bulgaria.

While Danielle showed an aptitude for the guitar at a young age, Moti made the decision that Este would be more suited to the bass, buying her a second hand Fender for $50.

== Career ==
=== Early career ===
Danielle started playing music at an early age, and was encouraged by her parents to pursue the guitar. As a child, she played lead guitar in a band called Rockinhaim which consisted of her parents and her two sisters. The band played mostly classic rock covers. After playing a gig with their parents, Danielle and her older sister Este were asked to join a pop group called the Valli Girls, and signed to Sony Records in 2004. Danielle also received a product endorsement deal from Gibson guitars. While later stating that this group was not a suitable outlet for the kind of music she wanted to be playing, the band did allow Danielle some commercial success. The group made promotional videos, an unreleased album, and their song "Always There in You" was featured on the soundtrack of The Sisterhood of the Traveling Pants in 2005.

Before forming a band with her sisters, Danielle toured with Jenny Lewis (2009 on guitar), and Julian Casablancas (2009–10 on percussion and guitar), and played guitar briefly for CeeLo Green in June 2010. She was introduced to Jenny Lewis by a friend of Jenny's who invited Danielle and Este to a jam session/party at Lewis' house on July 4, 2008. Lewis saw Danielle's performance on drums, and later asked her to tour with her as a guitarist. Julian Casablancas also saw Danielle perform on that tour, and asked her to be a part of his touring band, which went into rehearsals two days after wrapping Jenny Lewis's tour. Danielle appears in the official music video of Casablancas' song "11th Dimension". It was while on tour with other acts that Danielle realized she would much rather play on stage with her sisters. After two years of being on the road with other bands, Danielle came back to form a three-piece band with Este and Alana called Haim.

=== Haim ===
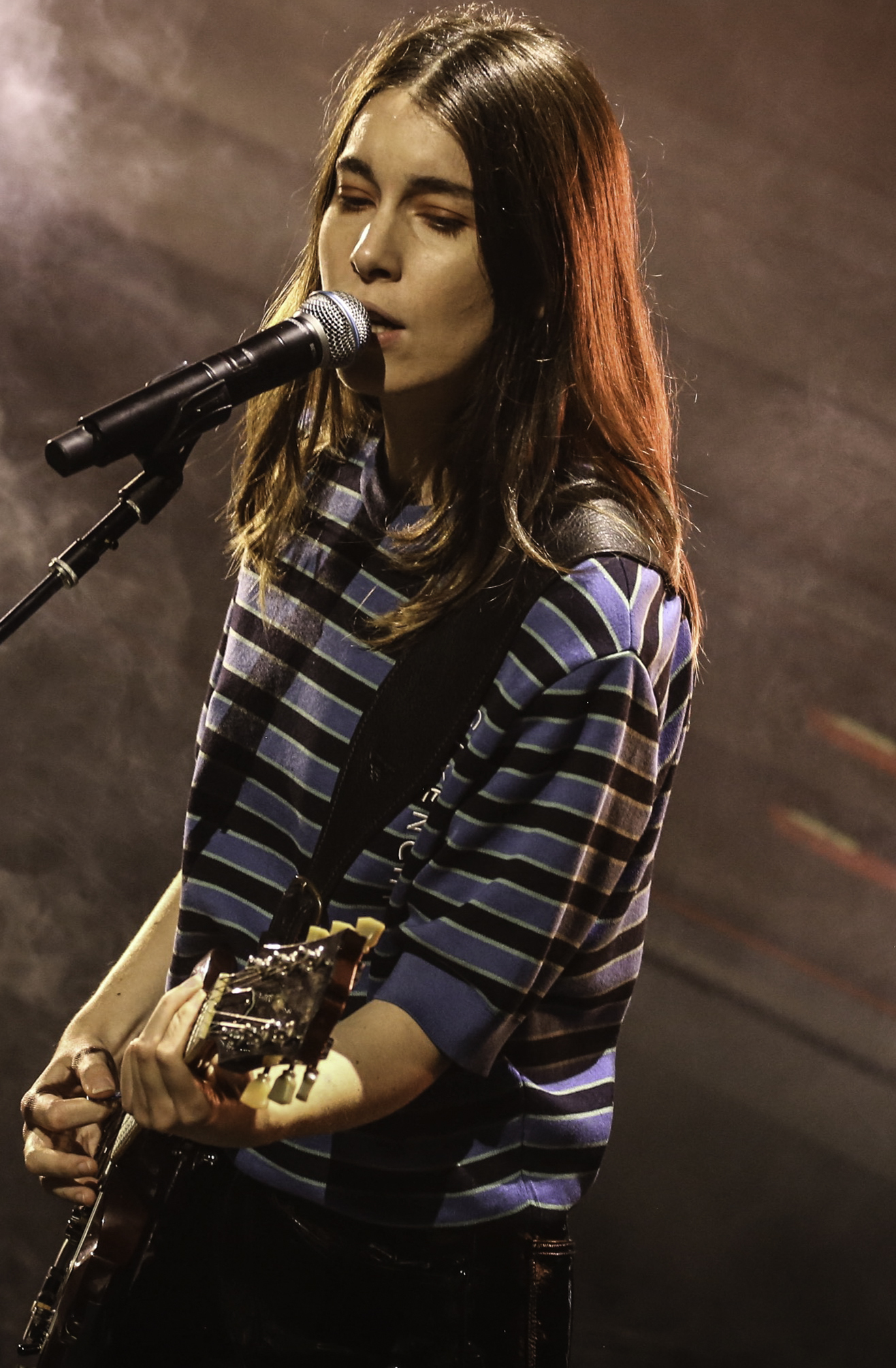
Performing with Haim in 2018

In 2007, Danielle and her sisters formed a band of their own known as Haim. They released an EP called Forever in 2012, and appeared at many music festivals, which brought them to the attention of Jay-Z. They were later signed to Roc Nation, and were one of the featured artists at Jay-Z's Made in America festival.

Haim released their first studio album titled Days Are Gone in September 2013. In July 2017, Haim's second studio album Something to Tell You was released to positive reviews. Haim's third studio album Women in Music Pt.III was released in June 2020 to widespread critical acclaim. The album received nominations for Album of the Year and Best Rock Performance at the 63rd Annual Grammy Awards in 2021.

=== Other collaborations ===
In August 2014, Danielle joined the Killers as the drummer for one song during a concert in San Francisco. The Killers' lead singer Brandon Flowers told the crowd that "We have a cool, special surprise guest. ... One of the bands that came out and dropped a record on us in 2013 and gave us hope for people playing music was Haim. Danielle, the singer from Haim, is actually a hell of a drummer." Haim later contributed drums to Flowers' song "Lonely Town" on his 2015 solo record The Desired Effect.

In 2019, Danielle was featured in Vampire Weekend's album Father of the Bride, providing vocals on the tracks "Hold You Now", "Married in a Gold Rush" and "We Belong Together". Also in 2019, Danielle played drums on the tracks "Sofia", "Impossible" and "Bags" from Clairo's album Immunity.

In 2025, Danielle was featured on Bon Iver's Sable, Fable on the track "If Only I Could Wait".

== Personal life ==
From 2013 to early 2022, Danielle dated producer Ariel Rechtshaid, who also produced Haim's first three albums. The first single from Haim's third record, "Summer Girl", was written for Rechtshaid after he was diagnosed with cancer; she broke up with him shortly after the album's release.

== Artistry ==
Danielle serves as Haim's lead vocalist and guitarist, although all three band members sing and play multiple instruments. Danielle also plays piano and drums, the latter of which she typically plays for the band's studio recordings. Vocally, Danielle is an alto, with Abby Johnston of The Austin Chronicle describing her vocal delivery as "understated". Reviewing Days Are Gone (2013), Heather Phares of AllMusic found Danielle's voice distinctive "Compared to the thin voices of so many 2010s pop stars", describing her as a "remarkably versatile" vocalist. The Pop Break contributor Jason Kundrath described Danielle as being "in full command of her low alto, stacking her syllables close together, and using each one percussively to create rhythmic hooks on top of her grade A melodies". Similarly, Spencer Kornhaber of The Atlantic observed that the artist "breaks words into a cluster of onomatopoeias delivered rapid-fire, making sentences sound like tongue twisters even without alliteration". When Danielle opted not to sing during a 2018 live performance upon contracting the flu, The Guardian music critic Kitty Empire found the absence of Danielle's vocals to be disorienting as a listener, opining that she "packs a gravitas her two sisters lack".

BBC music critic Mark Savage declared Danielle "the honorary Mick Jagger of Haim", drawing similarities between their musicianship, performance styles and physical appearance, which Savage attributes to her having toured with Jenny Lewis and The Strokes band member Julian Casablancas. Younger sister Alana likened her to rapper will.i.am because "She's always on some future shit". Aspects of Danielle's personal life and struggles were written into Haim's third album Women in Music Pt. III (2020), such as the depression she experienced post-tour and the cancer diagnosis of her boyfriend at the time, producer Ariel Rechtshaid. Several interviewers and publications have cited Danielle as the quietest and most reserved among her siblings, with Melena Ryzik of The New York Times describing her as the band's "most precise and serious-minded" member. Danielle herself admitted to being a shy person who "come[s] out of my shell on stage", an observation corroborated by DIY's Emma Snook. Danielle has publicly condemned the sexism she and her sisters receive as female rock musicians, believing their musical efforts are often dismissed and ignored by the rock community because they "don't take ourselves too seriously, and we do choreography in our music videos".

== Discography ==
=== Haim ===
- Days Are Gone (2013)
- Something to Tell You (2017)
- Women in Music Pt. III (2020)
- I Quit (2025)

=== As featured artist ===
Year	Artist(s)	Album	Title	Role(s)	Ref.
2010	Blake Mills	Break Mirrors	"Hey Lover"	Backing vocals	
2012	Childish Gambino	Royalty	"Won't Stop"	Featured vocals	
2013	Major Lazer	Free the Universe	"You're No Good"	Featured vocals	
2013	Portugal. The Man	Evil Friends	"Sea of Air"	Backing vocals	
2013	Natalia Kills	Trouble	"Trouble"	Guitar	
2013	Natalia Kills	Trouble	"Saturday Night"	Guitar	
2015	Tobias Jesso Jr.	Goon	"Without You"	Drums	
2019	Vampire Weekend	Father of the Bride	"Hold You Now"	Featured vocals	
2019	Vampire Weekend	Father of the Bride	"Harmony Hall"	Backing vocals	
2019	Vampire Weekend	Father of the Bride	"This Life"	Backing vocals	
2019	Vampire Weekend	Father of the Bride	"Married in a Gold Rush"	Featured vocals	
2019	Vampire Weekend	Father of the Bride	"Sympathy"	Backing vocals	
2019	Vampire Weekend	Father of the Bride	"We Belong Together"	Featured vocals	
2019	Vampire Weekend	Father of the Bride	"Stranger"	Backing vocals	
2019	Vampire Weekend	Father of the Bride	"Jerusalem, New York, Berlin"	Backing vocals	
2019	Vampire Weekend	Father of the Bride	"I Don't Think Much About Her No More"	Backing vocals	
2019	Clairo	Immunity	"Impossible"	Drums	
2019	Clairo	Immunity	"Bags"	Drums	
2019	Clairo	Immunity	"Sofia"	Drums	
2019	Jim-E Stack	EPHEMERA	"Good Enough"	Guitar	
2020	Major Lazer	Music is the Weapon	"Lay Your Head on Me"	Backing vocals	
2020	Mountain Brews	Raised in a Place EP	"The Worst Margarita of My Life"	Backing vocals	
2021	Rostam	Changephobia	"These Kids We Knew"	Drums	
2022	Cass McCombs	Heartmind	"Belong to Heaven"	Drums, timpani, background	
2022	Bruce Hornsby	'Flicted	"Days Ahead"	Featured vocals	
2023	Carly Rae Jepsen	The Loveliest Time	"Shadow"	Drums	
2025	Bon Iver	Sable, Fable	"I'll Be There"	Backing vocals	
2025	Bon Iver	Sable, Fable	"If Only I Could Wait"	Featured vocals	

== Filmography ==
=== Film ===
Year	Title	Role	Notes	Ref.
2021	Licorice Pizza	Danielle		

=== Music videos ===
Year	Artist	Title	Credited as	Notes
Year	Artist	Title	Director	Notes
2020	Haim	"The Steps"	Yes	Co-director with Paul Thomas Anderson
