= Whatever's Clever! World Tour =

2026 concert tour by Charlie Puth

- Tour by Charlie Puth
- Promotional poster
- Location: North America; Europe; Asia
- Associated album: Whatever's Clever!
- Start date: April 22, 2026
- End date: November 1, 2026
- No. of shows: 59
- Supporting acts: Daniel Seavey; Lawrence; Ally Salort

Charlie Puth concert chronology
- Something New (2024); Whatever's Clever! World Tour (2026)

The Whatever’s Clever! World Tour is an ongoing concert tour by American singer-songwriter Charlie Puth, in support of his fourth studio album Whatever's Clever! (2026). It began on April 22, 2026, in San Diego, and is scheduled to end on November 1, 2026, in Shanghai. It is Puth's first tour to feature concerts held in arenas and stadiums.

== Background ==
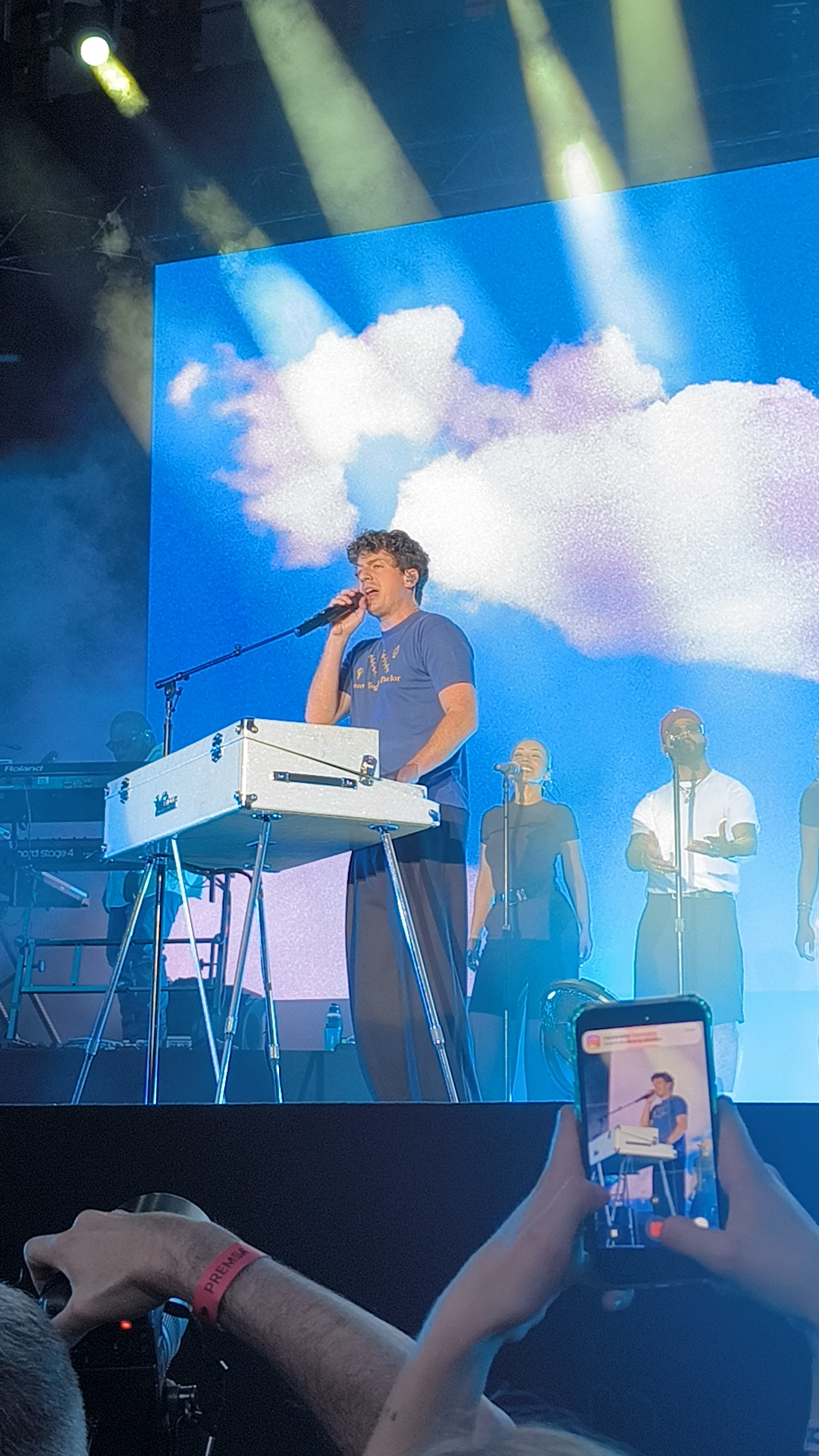
Puth performing at the Poble Espanyol in Barcelona during the tour.

In January 2026, Puth revealed plans for the Whatever's Clever! World Tour to promote his upcoming album of the same name, which was released that March. The tour's presales began on January 14, with general ticket sales opening on January 16. The announcement revealed 50 scheduled shows in North America and Europe, which included both solo headlining concerts and summer festival appearances. Daniel Seavey, Lawrence, and Ally Salort were announced as the tour's supporting acts for select dates.

On April 14, an Oceania leg was announced, however, the Australian and New Zealand dates were abruptly cancelled on September 19.

On October 8, 2026, it was announced that the Hong Kong stop, originally scheduled to take place at Kai Tak Stadium on October 21, 2026, has been postponed to April 2027 due to production and logistical challenges.

== Set list ==
This set list is representative of the show held in San Diego on April 22, 2026. It is not representative of every show on the tour.

1. "Beat Yourself Up"
2. "How Long"
3. "Washed Up"
4. "LA Girls"
5. "Empty Cups"
6. "Home"
7. "Cry"
8. "Patient"
9. "Sideways"
10. "We Don't Talk Anymore"
11. "BOY"
12. "Reply to This"
13. "Attention"
14. "Cheating on You"
15. "Suffer"
16. "Love In Exile"
17. "One Call Away"
18. "See You Again"
19. "Changes"

== Tour dates ==
List of 2026 concerts
Date (2026)	City	Country	Venue	Supporting act(s)
April 22	San Diego	United States	Viejas Arena	Daniel Seavey; Ally Salort
April 24	Phoenix	United States	Arizona Financial Theatre	Daniel Seavey; Ally Salort
April 25	Santa Barbara	United States	Santa Barbara Bowl	Daniel Seavey; Ally Salort
April 28	Anaheim	United States	Honda Center	Daniel Seavey; Ally Salort
April 29	Inglewood (Note: Labeled as Los Angeles in promotional material.)	United States	Kia Forum	Daniel Seavey; Ally Salort
May 1	San Francisco	United States	Bill Graham Civic Auditorium	Daniel Seavey; Ally Salort
May 3	Seattle	United States	WaMu Theater	Daniel Seavey; Ally Salort
May 5	Vancouver	Canada	Thunderbird Sports Centre	Daniel Seavey; Ally Salort
May 7	Portland	United States	Veterans Memorial Coliseum	Daniel Seavey; Ally Salort
May 9	West Valley City (Note: Labeled as Salt Lake City in promotional material.)	United States	Maverik Center	Daniel Seavey; Ally Salort
May 10	Denver	United States	Bellco Theatre	Daniel Seavey; Ally Salort
May 13	Kansas City	United States	Starlight Theatre	Daniel Seavey; Ally Salort
May 15	Rosemont	United States	Rosemont Theatre	Daniel Seavey; Ally Salort
May 16	Minneapolis	United States	Minneapolis Armory	Daniel Seavey; Ally Salort
May 19	Detroit	United States	Fox Theatre	Daniel Seavey; Ally Salort
May 20	Hamilton	Canada	TD Coliseum	Daniel Seavey; Ally Salort
May 22	Boston	United States	MGM Music Hall at Fenway	Daniel Seavey; Ally Salort
May 23	Uncasville	United States	Mohegan Sun Arena	Daniel Seavey; Ally Salort
May 26	Fairfax	United States	EagleBank Arena	Daniel Seavey; Ally Salort
May 29	New York City	United States	Madison Square Garden	Daniel Seavey; Ally Salort
May 30	Atlantic City	United States	Hard Rock Live	Ally Salort
June 1	Charlotte	United States	Spectrum Center	Ally Salort
June 3	Atlanta	United States	Synovus Bank Amphitheater	Ally Salort
June 5	Hollywood	United States	Hard Rock Live	Ally Salort
June 6	Orlando	United States	Addition Financial Arena	Ally Salort
June 9	Nashville	United States	Ascend Amphitheater	Ally Salort
June 11	Austin	United States	Moody Center	Ally Salort
June 12	Irving	United States	The Pavilion at Toyota Music Factory	Ally Salort
June 13	Houston	United States	713 Music Hall	Ally Salort; Lawrence
June 27 (Note: This show was part of Tinderbox Festival.)	Odense	Denmark	Tusindårsskoven	—N/a
June 30	Stockholm	Sweden	Gröna Lund	TBA
July 1	Helsinki	Finland	Allas Live	TBA
July 3 (Note: This show was part of Stavernfestivalen.)	Stavern	Norway	Larvik Golf Arena	—N/a
July 5	Hamburg	Germany	Stadtpark Open Air	TBA
July 6	Frankfurt	Germany	myticket Jahrhunderthalle	TBA
July 8 (Note: This show was part of BARTS Festival.)	Barcelona	Spain	Poble Espanyol	—N/a
July 9 (Note: This show was part of Mad Cool.)	Madrid	Spain	Iberdrola Music	—N/a
July 13	Paris	France	Olympia	TBA
July 15	London	England	Eventim Apollo	TBA
July 18	Birmingham	England	O_{2} Academy Birmingham	TBA
July 19	Dublin	Ireland	Iveagh Gardens	TBA
July 21	Edinburgh	Scotland	Usher Hall	TBA
July 22	Manchester	England	Manchester Academy	TBA
July 24	Pompei	Italy	Amphitheatre of Pompeii	TBA
July 25	Cernobbio	Italy	Villa Erba	TBA
July 27	Budapest	Hungary	Budapest Park	TBA
July 28	Prague	Czech Republic	Forum Karlín	TBA
July 30	Warsaw	Poland	Progresja Summer Stage	TBA
September 13 (Note: This show was part of Heineken Music Festival.)	Ho Chi Minh City	Vietnam	Creative Park	TBA
October 11	Goyang (Note: Labeled as Seoul in promotional material.)	South Korea	Goyang Stadium	TBA
October 14	Pasay (Note: Labeled as Manila in promotional material.)	Philippines	SM Mall of Asia Arena	TBA
October 16	Yokohama (Note: Labeled as Tokyo in promotional material.)	Japan	Pia Arena MM	TBA
October 20	Taipei	Taiwan	Taipei Arena	TBA
October 23	Guangzhou	China	Greater Bay Sports Center Stadium	TBA
October 25	Hangzhou	China	Huanglong Sports Center Stadium	TBA
October 28	Wuhan	China	Wuhan Sports Center Stadium	TBA
October 31	Shanghai	China	Hongkou Football Stadium	TBA
November 1	Shanghai	China	Hongkou Football Stadium	TBA

== Cancelled shows ==
List of cancelled shows
Date (2026)	City	Country	Venue	Reason
November 5	Auckland	New Zealand	Spark Arena	No reason indicated
November 7	Melbourne	Australia	Rod Laver Arena	No reason indicated
November 10	Sydney	Australia	Afterpay Arena	No reason indicated
November 13	Brisbane	Australia	Brisbane Entertainment Centre	No reason indicated
November 15	Adelaide	Australia	Adelaide Entertainment Centre	No reason indicated
November 17	Perth	Australia	RAC Arena	No reason indicated
