= Sequence 01 =

Studio album by F5ve
- Released: May 5, 2025
- Recorded: 2022–2025
- Genres: J-pop; hyperpop
- Length: 25:23; 1:21:47 (deluxe)
- Label: LDH
- Producer: BloodPop

Singles from Sequence 01
- 1. "Firetruck" Released: March 1, 2023; 2. "Lettuce" Released: May 3, 2024; 3. "Underground" Released: July 17, 2024; 4. "UFO" Released: October 17, 2024; 5. "Magic Clock" Released: March 5, 2025; 6. "Sugar Free Venom" Released: May 5, 2025

Sequence 01.5 (Dreaming of the 2nd 1st Impact - Consequences of Fate Redux)

Sequence 01 (stylized in all caps) is the debut studio album by Japanese girl group F5ve, released on May 5, 2025, through LDH Records. Under executive production from BloodPop, the album features additional work by A.G. Cook and Hudson Mohawke, and a guest appearance from American singer Kesha.

It is preceded by the singles "Firetruck", "Lettuce", "Underground", "UFO" and "Magic Clock".

A deluxe edition of the album, Sequence 01.5 (Dreaming of the 2nd 1st Impact - Consequences of Fate Redux) (Note: Stylized as SEQUENCE 01.5 (dreaming of the 2nd 1st impact - consequences of fate redux).), was released on November 14, 2025.

== Background and recording ==
F5ve, composed of the members Sayaka, Kaede, Miyuu, Ruri and Rui, originally made their debut in 2022 under the name SG5 ("Sailor Guardians 5"), taking direct inspiration from the manga franchise Sailor Moon. Their formation was a collaboration between LDH Japan and the globally-based Three Six Zero, with BloodPop brought on as executive producer. Their first and only single as this iteration, "Firetruck", was released in February 2023 and emphasized a "girl crush" concept; it was met with lukewarm reception.

By 2024, the group underwent a change in creative direction and re-emerged as F5ve, with subsequent releases taking on a hyperpop influence and ceasing their association to the manga. The group saw wide exposure after the singles "Lettuce" and "Underground" went viral on social media. In October 2024, the group revealed to Gay Times that their debut album was in production.

Sequence 01 was developed over nearly two years. Initial sessions took place in December 2023, with a team of American producers traveling to Japan to work with F5ve over two weeks. Kaede found the recording process with Bloodpop to be a "fresh" experience, "different from how Japanese people create music". Their creative team took heavy note of the group's music preferences, with the members sharing playlists for song ideas and giving their input on arrangements.

The album marked the first time that Sayaka, Kaede, and Miyuu recorded vocals for a project, who previously held dancer-only roles in their former group, Happiness. Rui shared that it was the first time that they were able to decide their own singing parts.

== Composition ==
Sequence 01 is conceptualized as a "sequence of dreams" and explores a range of genres as a result—dance, rock, funk and hyperpop among them. Member Ruri characterizes the album as straddling a "classic J-pop influence" that meets Western electronic pop, with a "futuristic edge to the production that keeps it cohesive".

The members sing in both Japanese and English. F5ve made it a point to deliver a distinct Japanese identity through their music, with Kaede adding: "I think [following trends] ends up diluting [that] aspect. [We are] transmitting Japanese culture as it is [and] I think it has hit audiences that have always been interested in Japanese culture and music." Japanese singer-songwriter Emyli, known for her work with M-Flo and Namie Amuro, is credited on all but three of the album's tracks. Anime, a common interest between the group and Bloodpop, was also a source of musical inspiration.

=== Songs ===
Following the brief introduction of "Initiate Sequence 01", the album opens with "Underground", which Rolling Stone Japan writer Minori singled out for its nod to Heisei era sensibilities in blending Eurobeat and hyperpop. "Magic Clock" is described as a melancholic, bright pop song mixed with "glitchy synths" that is centered around fleeting memories. Member Ruri called it "quintessentially J-pop", while Kaede noted comments on social media that likened it to "early 2000s K-pop".

== Release and artwork ==
Sequence 01 was announced on February 26, 2025, through the group's social media accounts. The cover photograph was taken by Charlotte Rutherford, who also directed several music videos for the group during the Sequence 01 album cycle. F5ve is seen examining office filing boxes while scattering documents. The creative direction was handled by Crystalline Structures, while the F5ve logo was designed by Timothy Luke.

Sequence 01.5 (Dreaming of the 2nd 1st Impact - Consequences of Fate Redux), the album's deluxe edition, was announced on November 4, 2025.

== Critical reception ==
Clash writer Maria Letícia L. Gomes gave the album an eight out of ten, calling it "chaotic, camp, and completely irresistible".

== Commercial performance ==
The album reached a debut position of 39 on the Japanese Oricon Albums Chart, selling 1,231 physical copies in its first week.

== Track listing ==
Sequence 01 track listing
No.	Title	Writer(s)	Producer(s)	Length
1.	"Initiate Sequence 01"	Count Baldor	Count Baldor	0:37
2.	"Underground" (アンダーグラウンド)	Bloodpop; Count Baldor; Emyli	Bloodpop; Count Baldor	2:21
3.	"Magic Clock"	Bloodpop; A.G. Cook; Count Baldor; Naomie Abergel; Emyli	Bloodpop; Cook	2:13
4.	"UFO"	Cook; Mark Johns; Bloodpop	Bloodpop; Cook; Count Baldor; Nomak	2:39
5.	"Firetruck"	Bloodpop; Count Baldor; Abergel; Ross Birchard	Bloodpop; Hudson Mohawke	2:23
6.	"Lettuce" (レタス)	Bloodpop; Count Baldor; AOBeats; Johns; Emyli	Bloodpop	2:08
7.	"Sugar Free Venom" (featuring Kesha)	AOBeats; Bloodpop; Count Baldor; Kesha Sebert; Abergel	AOBeats; Alexander Lewis; Bloodpop; Count Baldor	2:48
8.	"Television"	AOBeats; Bloodpop; Count Baldor; Emyli; Abergel; Yoshi	AOBeats; Bloodpop; Count Baldor	2:17
9.	"Bow Chika Wow Wow"	AOBeats; Bloodpop; Count Baldor; Emyli; Abergel	AOBeats; Bloodpop; Abergel	2:24
10.	"Jump"	Bloodpop; Count Baldor; Emyli	Bloodpop; Count Baldor	3:24
11.	"Real Girl" (リア女)	Bloodpop; Count Baldor; Emyli	Bloodpop; Count Baldor	2:09
Total length:				25:23

Sequence 01.5 (Dreaming of the 2nd 1st Impact - Consequences of Fate Redux) track listing
No.	Title	Length
12.	"Wish"	2:41
13.	"Snowman"	2:54
14.	"I Choose You"	2:09
15.	"UFO" (Dorian Electra & Count Baldor remix)	3:06
16.	"Underground" (DJ Chari × French Cries remix) (featuring Starkids)	2:33
17.	"Underground" (Yagi Exhibition's Mini 4WD remix)	2:40
18.	"Underground" (TeddyLoid remix)	2:26
19.	"Underground" (Doss remix)	2:51
20.	"Magic Clock" (The Deep & Kimj remix)	2:10
21.	"Sugar Free Venom" (Finn Keane remix) (featuring Kesha)	3:59
22.	"Firetruck" (Umru remix)	2:49
23.	"Bow Chika Wow Wow" (Shinichi Osawa remix)	3:44
24.	"Television" (Kyundesu remix) (featuring N ^{2}, Aisho Nakajima, sheidA, Yohji Igarashi)	3:27
25.	"Jump" (M-Flo remix)	4:29
26.	"Lettuce" (8-bit version)	2:08
27.	"Wish" (Himera's Shooting Star remix)	4:17
28.	"I Choose You" (Hana Truly remix)	4:23
29.	"Snowman" (Hannah Diamond remix)	3:38
Total length:		1:21:47

== Charts ==
Chart performance for Sequence 01
Chart (2025)	Peak position
Japanese Albums (Oricon)	39

== Release history ==
Region	Date	Format	Edition	Ref.
Various	May 5, 2025	CD; digital download; LP; streaming	Standard	
Various	November 14, 2025	Cassette	Standard	
Various	November 14, 2025	CD; digital download; LP; streaming	Deluxe (Note: Titled Sequence 01.5 (Dreaming of the 2nd 1st Impact - Consequences of Fate Redux).)	
