= BloodPop =

American musician (born 1990)

- Also known as: Blood Diamonds; Michael Diamond; Blood
- Born: Michael Tucker; August 15, 1990 (age 36); Kansas City, Missouri, U.S.
- Genre: Electropop
- Occupations: Musician; record producer; songwriter
- Years active: 2010–present
- Labels: Transparent Records; 4AD; Owsla; GENPOP; Republic

Michael Tucker (born August 15, 1990), known professionally as BloodPop (stylized as BloodPop^{®}), is an American musician, record producer, songwriter, and gaming executive.

== Life and early career ==
Tucker was born in Kansas City, Missouri, United States. Tucker studied jazz guitar in school and, under the guidance of Cody Critcheloe of SSION, learned how to produce music in his parents' basement while he studied at the Kansas City Art Institute.

He moved to Vancouver in the late 2000s to study video game design at the Vancouver Film School. It was while in Vancouver that Tucker bonded with fellow creatives - most notably Grimes, a Vancouver native - while frequently DJ'ing at local parties.

In his spare time, he continued producing music with Ableton and sporadically released glitchy, multi-layered electropop instrumentals online, eventually catching the attention of Transparent Records and dubstep artist Skrillex's Owsla imprint. He then relocated to Los Angeles.

== Music career ==
After relocating to Los Angeles and using the monikers Blood and Blood Diamonds, Tucker began to make his mark by working with established artists. He collaborated with Grimes (on his debut 2011 EP, Phone Sex, and later on her 2014 track, "Go"), while also being drafted in to officially remix tracks by artists such as Kendrick Lamar, Beyoncé, Ellie Goulding, and Major Lazer.

In 2014, he worked alongside fellow producers Avicii and DJ Dahl on Madonna's thirteenth studio album, Rebel Heart, which was released the following year, with Tucker providing input on the tracks "Devil Pray", "Iconic", "Body Shop" and "Beautiful Scars". Tucker also earned a prominent production credit for smash hit, "Sorry", on Purpose, the fourth album by Justin Bieber, in 2015.

Tucker then went on to produce tracks for Britney Spears, Fifth Harmony, and Hana before working on Lady Gaga's 2016 album, Joanne, alongside Mark Ronson and Kevin Parker of Tame Impala. Tucker began operating under the name BloodPop that year, and he rounded off 2016 by producing John Legend's "What You Do to Me".

The following year saw him return with a remix of "Little of Your Love" by indie pop trio Haim, as well as a single co-written with Bieber entitled "Friends". 2019 saw Tucker issue the jubilant single "Newman" under the BloodPop moniker, as well as contributing to Post Malone's "Internet".

Tucker executive produced Lady Gaga's sixth studio album, Chromatica, including lead single, "Stupid Love".

In 2023, Tucker was nominated for the Academy Award for Best Original Song for "Hold My Hand", co-written and performed by Lady Gaga, from the Top Gun: Maverick soundtrack.

Tucker co-produced Charlie Puth's fourth album Whatever's Clever! along with Puth.

== Other activities ==
In 2023, Tucker announced the formation of Genpop Interactive, a studio dedicated to driving “forward the next-gen of music, fashion, and gaming culture.”

== Personal life ==
Tucker has been dating American songwriter and producer Hana since May 2013. They met at a recording session. As of May 2023, they are engaged.

== Discography ==
=== Singles ===
As lead artist

List of singles as lead artist, with selected chart positions and certifications, showing year released and album name
Year	Title	Artists	Peak chart positions										Certifications	Album
Year	Title	Artists	US	AUS	CAN	DEN	FRA	GER	IRL	NZ	SWE	UK	Certifications	Album
2017	"Friends"	Justin Bieber, BloodPop	20	2	4	1	8	4	4	2	2	2	ARIA: 4× Platinum; BVMI: Platinum; RMNZ: Gold; MC: 2× Platinum; BPI: Gold; IFPI DEN: Platinum; IFPI SWE: Gold	Non-album single
2018	"Capital Letters"	Hailee Steinfeld, BloodPop	— (Note: "Capital Letters" did not enter the Billboard Hot 100, but peaked at number 12 on the Bubbling Under Hot 100 Singles chart.)	36	69	34	12	32	—	— (Note: "Capital Letters" did not enter the NZ Top 40 Singles Chart, but peaked at number 10 on the NZ Heatseeker Singles Chart.)	42	39	ARIA: 2× Platinum; BVMI: Gold; MC: Platinum	Fifty Shades Freed: Original Motion Picture Soundtrack
2019	"Newman"	BloodPop	—	—	—	—	—	—	—	—	—	—		Non-album single
"—" denotes a recording that did not chart or was not released.

=== Songwriting and production credits ===
Year	Title	Artist(s)	Album	Credit
2010	"So What?"	Far East Movement	Free Wired	Songwriter
2011	"Girl"	Das Racist	Relax	Producer
2011	"Hauntin' Me"	Keep Shelly in Athens	Non-album single	Remixer
2012	"Swimming Pools/Drank" (Blood Diamonds Remix)	Kendrick Lamar, BloodPop (credited as Blood Diamonds)	Non-album single	Remixer
2013	"Grins"	Charli XCX	True Romance	Producer, songwriter
2013	"Anything Could Happen" (Blood Diamonds Remix)	Ellie Goulding, BloodPop (credited as Blood Diamonds)	Non-album single	Remixer
2014	"Go"	Grimes, BloodPop (credited as Blood Diamonds)	Non-album single	Producer, songwriter
2014	"No Evidence"	Rome Fortune	Small VVorld	Producer, songwriter
2014	"Bet"	Tinashe, Devonte Hynes	Aquarius	Producer, songwriter
2014	"Giant in My Heart" (Blood Diamonds Remix)	Kiesza, BloodPop (credited as Blood Diamonds)	Non-album single	Remixer
2014	"You're Not the One" (Blood Diamonds Remix)	Sky Ferreira, BloodPop (credited as Blood Diamonds)	Non-album single	Remixer
2015	"U"	Mikky Ekko	Time	Producer, songwriter
2015	"They. Resurrect. Over. New."	Lupe Fiasco, Ab-Soul	Tetsuo & Youth	Producer, songwriter
2015	"Iconic"	Madonna, Mike Tyson, Chance The Rapper	Rebel Heart	Producer, songwriter
2015	"Devil Pray"	Madonna	Rebel Heart	Producer, songwriter
2015	"Body Shop"	Madonna	Rebel Heart	Producer, songwriter
2015	"Beautiful Scars"	Madonna	Rebel Heart	Producer, songwriter
2015	"Borrowed Time"	Madonna	Rebel Heart	Producer, songwriter
2015	"Paw Due Respect"	Run the Jewels	Meow the Jewels	Remixer
2015	"Tell Me"	Raye	Second EP	Producer, songwriter
2015	"Touch"	Pia Mia	Non-album single	Producer, songwriter
2015	"Sorry"	Justin Bieber	Purpose	Producer, songwriter
2015	"Mark My Words"	Justin Bieber	Purpose	Producer, songwriter
2015	"I'll Show You"	Justin Bieber	Purpose	Producer, songwriter
2015	"Children"	Justin Bieber	Purpose	Producer, songwriter
2015	"Hit the Ground"	Justin Bieber	Purpose	Songwriter
2015	"Lisa"	LE1F	Riot Boi	Producer, songwriter
2015	"Haunted" (Michael Diamond Remix)	Beyoncé, BloodPop (credited as Michael Diamond)	Non-album single	Remixer
2016	"Body"	Dreezy, Jeremih	No Hard Feelings	Producer
2016	"Clay"	Hana	Hana EP	Songwriter
2016	"Avalanche"	Hana	Hana EP	Songwriter
2016	"Underwater"	Hana	Hana EP	Songwriter
2016	"A Noite É Dela"	Pedro Ratão	Non-album single	Producer
2016	"Scared of Happy"	Fifth Harmony	7/27	Producer, songwriter
2016	"Hands"	Various artists	Non-album single	Songwriter
2016	"Seavvorld"	Rome Fortune	VVorldwide Pimpstation	Producer
2016	"Better"	Britney Spears	Glory	Producer, songwriter
2016	"Drum"	MØ	Non-album single	Producer, songwriter
2016	"Me Now"	Denzel Curry	Imperial	Producer
2016	"Diamond Heart"	Lady Gaga	Joanne	Producer
2016	"A-Yo"	Lady Gaga	Joanne	Producer, songwriter
2016	"Perfect Illusion"	Lady Gaga	Joanne	Producer, songwriter
2016	"Joanne"	Lady Gaga	Joanne	Producer
2016	"John Wayne"	Lady Gaga	Joanne	Producer, songwriter
2016	"Dancin' in Circles"	Lady Gaga	Joanne	Producer, songwriter
2016	"Million Reasons"	Lady Gaga	Joanne	Producer
2016	"Sinner's Prayer"	Lady Gaga	Joanne	Producer
2016	"Come to Mama"	Lady Gaga	Joanne	Producer
2016	"Angel Down"	Lady Gaga	Joanne	Producer
2016	"Grigio Girls"	Lady Gaga	Joanne	Producer, songwriter
2016	"Hey Girl"	Lady Gaga, Florence Welch	Joanne	Producer
2016	"Blow You Up"	Yogi, Aluna George, Less is More	Non-album single	Producer, songwriter
2016	"What You Do to Me"	John Legend	Darkness and Light	Songwriter
2017	"Want You Back"	Haim	Something to Tell You	Producer
2017	"Wanna Know Love"	Jasmine Thompson	Wonderland EP	Songwriter
2017	"Friends"	Justin Bieber, BloodPop	Non-album single	Artist
2017	"...Ready For It?" (BloodPop® Remix)	Taylor Swift, BloodPop	Non-album single	Remixer
2017	"Lust For Life" (BloodPop® Remix)	Lana Del Rey, The Weeknd, BloodPop	Non-album single	Remixer
2017	"Little of Your Love" (BloodPop® Remix)	Haim, BloodPop	Non-album single	Remixer
2018	"A Good Night"	John Legend, BloodPop	Non-album single	Artist, producer, songwriter, drums
2018	"Capital Letters"	Hailee Steinfeld, BloodPop	Fifty Shades Freed: Original Motion Picture Soundtrack	Artist, producer, songwriter
2018	"Carousel"	Travis Scott, Frank Ocean	Astroworld	Songwriter
2018	"Enemies"	Lauv	I Met You When I Was 18 (The Playlist)	Producer
2018	"My One"	Lily Allen	No Shame	Producer, songwriter
2018	"Cowboy"	Alma	Non-album single	Producer, songwriter
2018	"Depressed"	12 Honcho	Non-album single	Producer, songwriter
2019	"South East London"	Raye	Rapman Presents: Blue Story OST	Songwriter
2019	"Internet"	Post Malone	Hollywood's Bleeding	Producer, songwriter
2019	"Jerusalem, New York, Berlin"	Vampire Weekend	Father of the Bride	Producer
2019	"Spring Snow"	Vampire Weekend	Father of the Bride	Producer, songwriter
2019	"Unbearably White"	Vampire Weekend	Father of the Bride	Producer
2019	"Sweettalk My Heart" (BloodPop® and Burns Vitaclub Remix)	Tove Lo, BloodPop, Burns	Non-album single	Remixer
2019	"RIP Harambe"	Yung Jake	Non-album single	Producer
2019	"We Appreciate Power" (BloodPop® Remix)	Grimes, Hana, BloodPop	Non-album single	Remixer
2020	"Lucid"	Rina Sawayama	Sawayama (Deluxe edition)	Producer
2020	"Face Down: Reborn"	Arashi	Non-album single	Producer
2020	"Ghosts"	Tchami, Hana	Year Zero	Co-writer
2020	"Rain on Me"	Lady Gaga and Ariana Grande	Chromatica	Producer, songwriter
2020	"Stupid Love"	Lady Gaga	Chromatica	Producer, songwriter, bass, drums, guitar, keyboards, percussion
2020	"Alice"	Lady Gaga	Chromatica	Producer, songwriter, bass, drums, keyboard, guitar, percussion, programming
2020	"Free Woman"	Lady Gaga	Chromatica	Producer, songwriter, bass, drums, keyboard, guitar, percussion
2020	"Fun Tonight"	Lady Gaga	Chromatica	Producer, songwriter, bass, drums, keyboard, guitar, percussion
2020	"911"	Lady Gaga	Chromatica	Producer, songwriter, bass, drums, keyboard, guitar, percussion
2020	"Plastic Doll"	Lady Gaga	Chromatica	Producer, songwriter, bass, drums, keyboard, guitar, percussion
2020	"Sour Candy"	Lady Gaga, Blackpink	Chromatica	Producer, songwriter, bass, drums, keyboard, percussion
2020	"Enigma"	Lady Gaga	Chromatica	Producer, songwriter
2020	"Replay"	Lady Gaga	Chromatica	Songwriter
2020	"Sine from Above"	Lady Gaga, Elton John	Chromatica	Producer, songwriter, bass, drums, keyboard, guitar, percussion
2020	"1000 Doves"	Lady Gaga	Chromatica	Producer, songwriter, bass, drums, keyboard, guitar, percussion, programming
2020	"Babylon"	Lady Gaga	Chromatica	Producer, songwriter, bass, drums, keyboard, percussion
2020	"Stupid Love" (BloodPop® and Burns Vitaclub Warehouse Mix)	Lady Gaga, BloodPop, Burns	Chromatica (Deluxe Edition)	Remixer, producer, songwriter, bass, drums, guitar, keyboards, percussion
2021	"Die4U"	Bring Me the Horizon	Post Human: Nex Gen	Producer, songwriter
2022	"Hold My Hand"	Lady Gaga	Top Gun: Maverick Music from the Motion Picture	Producer, songwriter
2022	"All Up in Your Mind"	Beyoncé	Renaissance	Co-producer, songwriter
2022	"Pure/Honey"	Beyoncé	Renaissance	Producer, songwriter
2022	"Strangers"	Bring Me the Horizon	Post Human: Nex Gen	Producer, songwriter
2023	"Firetruck"	F5ve	Sequence 01	Producer, songwriter
2023	"Angel"	PinkPantheress	Barbie the Album	Producer, songwriter
2023	"3D"	Jungkook, Jack Harlow	Golden	Producer, songwriter
2024	"Stay Awake 4 Me"	Chuck Ellis	Brainbox	Producer, songwriter
2024	"Talk It Up"	Chuck Ellis	Brainbox	Producer, songwriter
2024	"Lettuce"	F5ve	Sequence 01	Producer, songwriter
2024	"Underground"	F5ve	Sequence 01	Producer
2024	"Bibidiba" (BloodPop® Remix)	Suisei Hoshimachi	Non-album single	Remixer
2024	"1-800-Hot-N-Fun"	Le Sserafim	Crazy	Producer, songwriter
2024	"UFO"	F5ve	Sequence 01	Co-producer, co-songwriter
2025	"Magic Clock"	F5ve	Sequence 01	Producer, co-songwriter
2025	"Done Like That"	Chuck Ellis	Nice & Sweet	Producer
2025	"Love Who You Love"	Romy	Non-album single	Co-producer, co-songwriter
2026	"Nightshift Superstar"	Muse	The Wow! Signal	Additional production

== Awards and nominations ==
Year	Awards	Category	Work	Outcome	Ref.
2015	Much Music Video Awards	Video of the Year	Grimes (feat. Blood Diamonds) – "Go"	Nominated	
2015	Much Music Video Awards	Best Post-Production	Grimes (feat. Blood Diamonds) – "Go"	Nominated	
2015	Much Music Video Awards	Best Director	Grimes (feat. Blood Diamonds) – "Go"	Nominated	
2017	Grammy Awards	Album of the Year	Purpose (credited as a producer)	Nominated	
2022	Hollywood Music in Media Awards	Best Original Song – Feature Film	Lady Gaga – "Hold My Hand"	Nominated	
2022	World Soundtrack Awards	Best Original Song	Lady Gaga – "Hold My Hand"	Nominated	
2023	Academy Awards	Best Original Song	Lady Gaga – "Hold My Hand"	Nominated	
2023	Critics' Choice Movie Awards	Best Song	Lady Gaga – "Hold My Hand"	Nominated	
2023	Georgia Film Critics Association	Best Original Song	Lady Gaga – "Hold My Hand"	Won	
2023	Golden Globe Awards	Best Original Song	Lady Gaga – "Hold My Hand"	Nominated	
2023	Grammy Awards	Best Song Written for Visual Media	Lady Gaga – "Hold My Hand"	Nominated	
2023	Grammy Awards	Album of the Year	Renaissance (credited as a producer)	Nominated	
2023	Guild of Music Supervisors Awards	Best Song/Recording Created for a Film	Lady Gaga – "Hold My Hand"	Nominated	
2023	Hollywood Critics Association	Best Original Song	Lady Gaga – "Hold My Hand"	Nominated	
2023	Houston Film Critics Society	Best Original Song	Lady Gaga – "Hold My Hand"	Nominated	
2023	Satellite Awards	Best Original Song	Lady Gaga – "Hold My Hand"	Won	
2023	Society of Composers & Lyricists Awards	Outstanding Original Song for a Dramatic or Documentary Visual Media Production	Lady Gaga – "Hold My Hand"	Nominated	
