= Beat Yourself Up =

Single by Charlie Puth

from the album Whatever's Clever!
- Released: January 16, 2026
- Genre: Funk
- Length: 2:58
- Label: Atlantic
- Songwriters: Puth; BloodPop
- Producers: Puth; BloodPop

Charlie Puth singles chronology
"Changes" (2025)	"Beat Yourself Up" (2026)	"Home" (2026)

Performance video
- "Beat Yourself Up" on YouTube

"Beat Yourself Up" is a song by Charlie Puth, released as a single from his fourth studio album Whatever's Clever! (2026). It is a song about optimism, advising the listener to "please don't beat yourself up, whatever you do".

== Background and composition ==
Written by Puth and BloodPop, the song is a funk style optimistic song, advising the listener not to beat themselves up. According to Puth:

'Beat Yourself Up' started as something I wanted to tell a friend. We've never been the heart-to-heart types, so I wrote it in a song instead. I wanted to tell him that even though he has made mistakes along the way, he shouldn't be so hard on himself. That things will get better and he's not alone. While writing it, I soon realized this wasn't just for my friend but myself and so many others who can be hard on themselves. It's a message to keep going and be kinder to yourself.

== Release and reception ==
In a review for Rolling Stone, Jon Dolan writes that the song "imparts similarly earnest thoughts over a sophisti-pop swing that brings to mind Scritti Politti or Swing Out Sister."

Neil Z. Yeung wrote for AllMusic that the track "continues to inspire and motivate – both himself and a friend – as the singer looks back on experiences, his perseverance, and turning that into a universal message."

== Credits and personnel ==
According to Tidal:

Performers

- Charlie Puth – vocals, keyboards, mixer, writer producer
- Pastor Funk – bass
- William Nathan Farrington – bass
- Ben Lash – cello
- Christopher Ahn – cello
- Joy Payton-Stevens – cello
- Juan-Salvador Carrasco – cello
- Stanley Rudolph – drums
- Curt Chambers – guitar
- Leddie Garcia – percussion
- Jeff Driskill – saxophone
- Ido Meshulam – trombone
- Rob Schaer – trumpet
- Wayne Bergeron – trumpet
- Carolyn Riley – viola
- Corrine Sobolewski – viola
- Drew Forde – viola
- Emily WIlliams – viola
- Adam Milstine – violin
- Ji Young An – violin
- Kerenza Peacock – violin
- Mark Robertson – violin
- Maya Magub – violin
- Michael Siess – violin
- Misha Vayman – violin
- Radu Pieptea – violin
- Sara Parkins – violin
- Stephanie Yu – violin
- Katie Sloan – violine

Production

- Eric Eylands – assistant engineer
- Ramiro Fernandez-Soanne – assistant mixer
- Ben Sedano – engineer
- Zach Pererya – masterer
- Manny Marroquin – mixer
- Noah Gladstone – orchestral contractor
- Steve Hackman – orchestra leader and manager
- Brad Richie – orchestration
- Thanh Tran – orchestration

== Charts ==
=== Weekly charts ===
Weekly chart performance
Chart (2026)	Peak position
Argentina Anglo Airplay (Monitor Latino)	13
Croatia International Airplay (Top lista)	16
Germany Airplay (BVMI)	73
Latvia Airplay (TopHit)	62
Lithuania Airplay (TopHit)	84
New Zealand Hot Singles (RMNZ)	18
Paraguay Anglo Airplay (Monitor Latino)	9
Venezuela Airplay (Record Report)	32

=== Monthly charts ===
Monthly chart performance
Chart (2026)	Peak position
Latvia Airplay (TopHit)	81
