= F5ve =

Japanese girl group

f5ve
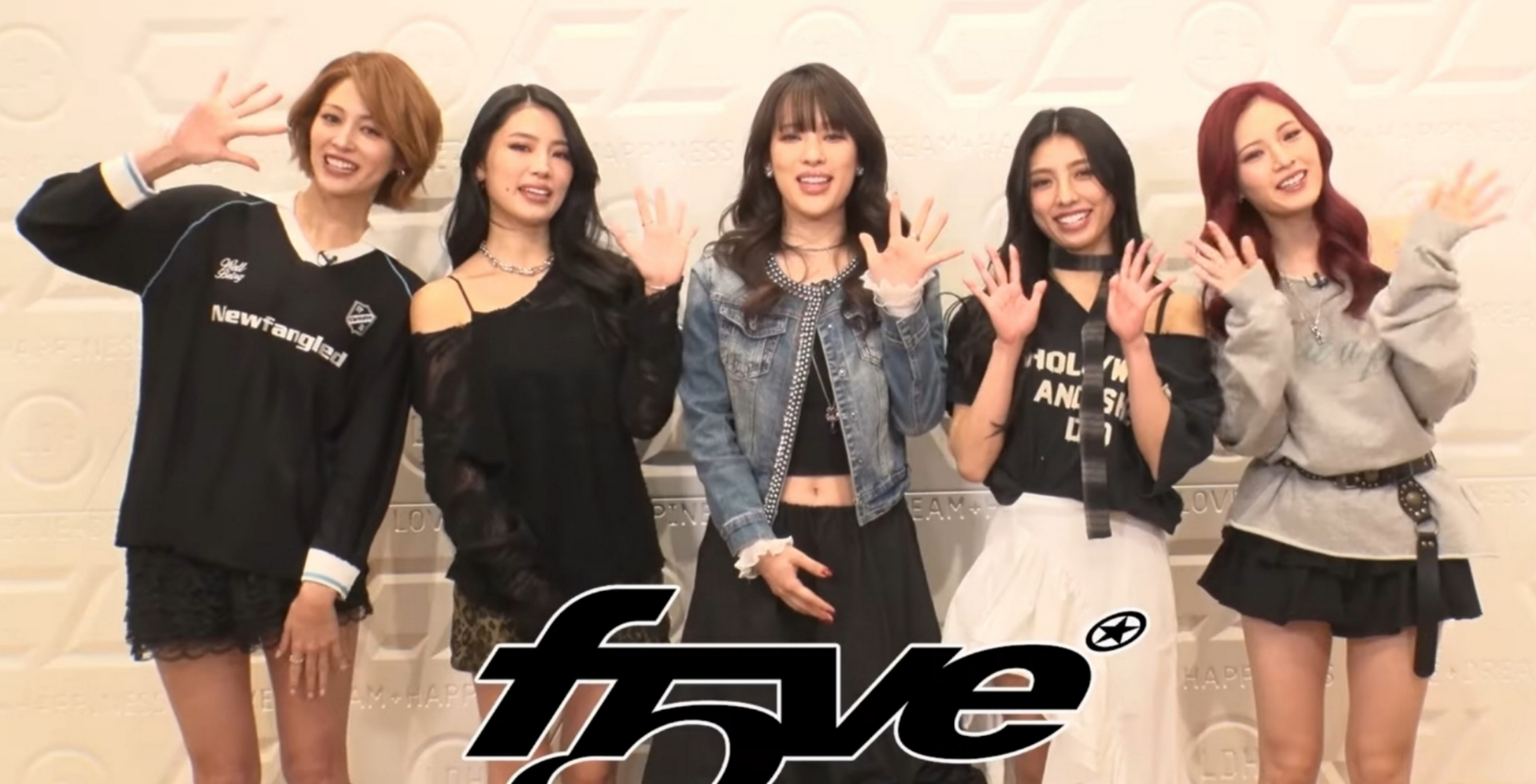
- F5ve in May 2025; L–R: Kaede, Ruri, Miyuu, Sayaka, and Rui

Background information
- Also known as: SG5 (2022–2023)
- Origin: Tokyo, Japan
- Genres: J-pop; hyperpop; pop-trap
- Years active: 2022–present
- Labels: LDH; Three Six Zero
- Spinoff of: Happiness; iScream
- Members: Sayaka; Kaede; Ruri; Miyuu; Rui
- Website: f5veofficial.com

F5ve (ファイビー, Faibī), stylized in lowercase and pronounced "fi-vee", and known formerly as SG5, is a Japanese girl group formed in 2022 by LDH and Three Six Zero. The group consists of Sayaka, Kaede, Ruri, Miyuu, and Rui, with BloodPop serving as their executive producer.

As SG5, the group was based around the Sailor Moon franchise. They released their debut single, "Firetruck", in 2023 before rebranding as F5ve in 2024, when they released the singles "Lettuce" and "Underground", which were featured on their debut studio album Sequence 01 (2025). As of 2024, the group is signed to Three Six Zero Recordings. In May 2025, Three Six Zero stopped managing F5ve, making LDH the only manager of the group.

== History ==
=== 2008–2023: Previous activities and formation as SG5 ===
Prior to the formation of F5ve, Sayaka, Kaede, Ruri, and Miyuu were all members of the LDH Japan girl group Happiness (2008–2023), and its collective unit E-girls (2011–2020). Ruri was first made a member of E-girls in 2013, and was then added to Happiness several months later. Both Ruri and Miyuu left E-girls in 2017 to focus on Happiness, following the collective's restructure.

Under an initiative to bring Japanese music to a global audience, LDH began collaborating with the globally-based Three Six Zero to form a new "overseas project" in 2020. The project was led by Japanese rapper and producer Verbal, of the international business division at LDH. BloodPop became the group's executive producer through his connection with Verbal, whom BloodPop befriended after DJing an event for Beats by Dr. Dre in 2017.

Their line-up and concept was finalized in early 2022, with the then-unnamed group making a surprise appearance at Anime Central in Illinois in May 2022. Their name was revealed as SG5 (an initialism of "Sailor Guardians 5") shortly before their official debut at the 2022 Anime Expo in Los Angeles. SG5 was themed after the manga franchise Sailor Moon, with its creator Naoko Takeuchi promptly giving her approval during proposals. They were signed to WME for global representation in September 2022.

The group's debut single, "Firetruck", was released with a music video in February 2023. SG5 differed from the members' previous groups in that Sayaka, Kaede, and Miyuu were given the opportunity to sing in addition to dancing. SG5 marked the first time they recorded music and shot a music video outside of Japan, both taking place in the United States.

=== 2024–present: Rename to F5ve, Sequence 01 ===
The group was renamed to F5ve in April 2024, and they re-introduced themselves as "inter-dimensional dream agents from Tokyo, Japan", ceasing their association with Sailor Moon. Crystalline Structures Studio was brought on to handle their creative direction. They released the single "Lettuce" in May 2024, with critics noting a 2000s R&B and hyperpop influence. The song went viral on TikTok.

Their follow-up single, "Underground", was released in July 2024. In October, F5ve released the single "UFO", about a girl so good at claw machines people think she is an alien. The music video was filmed in Akihabara.

Harper's Bazaar Japan named the group as among the "Most Powerful People of 2025", while NME called them "effortlessly cool and wacky" in their "NME 100: Essential Emerging Artists for 2025" feature. Rolling Stone Japan similarly listed F5ve in their yearly "Future of Music" report, highlighting their "cutting edge" sound.

On March 5, 2025, they released the single "Magic Clock", along with announcing the release date of May 5 for their debut album, Sequence 01. The music video for the song was directed by Crystalline Structures Studio, and features Tsurugi of the band Psychic Fever.

Released on May 5, 2025, Sequence 01 features 11 tracks, including the previously released "Lettuce", "Underground", and "Magic Clock", and includes a collaboration with American singer Kesha. Produced by f5ve's executive producer BloodPop, with additional production from A. G. Cook, Hudson Mohawke, Count Baldor, and others, BloodPop drew inspiration from Japanese anime music such as Yoasobi's "Idol" for the track "リア女 (Real Girl)".

On November 4, 2025, a reissue of Sequence 01 was announced, entitled as Sequence 01.5 (dreaming of the 2nd 1st impact - consequences of fate redux), which later released on November 14.

== Artistry ==
F5ve is committed to an authentic incorporation of Japanese culture in their music. In an interview with Dazed, member Kaede explained that though their work may eschew a "traditional J-pop sound", their ability to explore a range of music genres allows them to expand the boundaries of it. F5ve have cited Morning Musume, Blackpink, Perfume, MAX and the Pussycat Dolls as girl groups that have inspired their image and sound.

== Members ==
- Sayaka was born September 20, 1995, in Miyazaki, Japan. She began attending EXPG Studio Miyazaki, a performing arts school operated by the LDH company, in elementary school at age 9. Outside LDH, Sayaka's interest in fashion design led to collaborations with a number of local brands. She founded the petite clothing brand Sirius+81 in 2023, before ceasing operations the next year.
- Kaede was born January 11, 1996, in Kanagawa, Japan. She is the leader of the group. She started dancing in the fourth grade, and attended a local dance school. She was personally invited by Tetsuya of the boy band Exile to begin attending EXPG Studio Tokyo in the seventh grade. Outside LDH, Kaede is known for her modelling work, making her debut in 2011. Her early inspirations included Morning Musume, Girls' Generation, and Disney Channel stars.
- Ruri was born April 12, 1996, in Osaka, Japan. She was inspired by Ayumi Hamasaki to become a singer, and began taking lessons in the fifth grade. She attended EXPG Studio Osaka.
- Miyuu was born August 16, 1996, in Kanagawa, Japan. She attended EXPG Studio Tokyo. In 2017, she spent a year and a half studying choreography, which allowed her to work behind the scenes with E-girls and its affiliated acts.
- Rui was born November 4, 2003, in Aichi, Japan. She began learning dance at age 4, and was inspired by E-girls and Namie Amuro to become a performer. Rui began attending EXPG Studio Nagoya as a third grader, and passed auditions to join its elite division, EXPG Lab, in the eighth grade. Through this, she was introduced as a member of the trainee project group Kizzy in 2017. Between 2019 and 2021, Rui released solo music under the kanji form of her name (琉衣); its promotional material did not feature her image. Rui made her official debut in 2021 with the girl group iScream, of which she is also currently a part.

== Discography ==
=== Studio albums ===
List of studio albums and showing selected details, peaks and sales
Title	Details	Peak chart positions	Sales
Title	Details	JPN	Sales
Sequence 01	Released: May 5, 2025; Labels: LDH Records; Formats: CD, digital download, LP, streaming	39	JPN: 1,521 (phy.)

=== Reissue studio albums ===
List of reissue studio albums
Title	Details
Sequence 01.5 (Dreaming of the 2nd 1st Impact - Consequences of Fate Redux)	Released: November 14, 2025; Labels: LDH Records; Formats: Digital download, streaming

=== Singles ===
List of singles
Title	Year	Album
"Firetruck"	2023	Sequence 01
"Lettuce"	2024	Sequence 01
"Underground"	2024	Sequence 01
"UFO" (solo or remix featuring Dorian Electra and Count Baldor)	2024	Sequence 01
"Magic Clock"	2025	Sequence 01
"Sugar Free Venom" (featuring Kesha)	2025	Sequence 01
"I Choose You"	2025	Sequence 01
"bordercoaster" (BACARDI RECORDS featuring f5ve, Enon Kawatani)	2025	Non-album single
"Tropical Paradise (3am girls)" (BACARDI RECORDS featuring f5ve, Utaha)	2026	Non-album single
