= This Way (Hana Pestle album) =

Studio album by Hana Pestle
- Released: September 22, 2009
- Recorded: 2008–2009
- Genre: Alternative rock
- Length: 51:13
- Label: FNR
- Producers: Ben Moody, Michael Herring

Hana Pestle chronology
| Live in the Studio EP (2009) | This Way (2009) | For the Sky EP (2011) |

This Way is the debut album by Hana Pestle. The album was released on September 22, 2009, via Hanapestle.com, and iTunes through Ben Moody's label FNR Records.

MojoRadio.us calls This Way a journey where "Pestle's lyrics combine with an emotive and ethereal vocal style to evoke soul stirring memories. Her songs sway from brooding and moody, to inspiring and uplifting."

Professional ratings
Review scores
| Source | Rating |
|---|---|
| Mojo Radio | (9.3/10) |

== Track listing ==
| No. | Title | Length |
|---|---|---|
| 1. | "Never Learned to Lie" | 3:19 |
| 2. | "The Red Death Ball" | 4:43 |
| 3. | "Need" | 3:52 |
| 4. | "Rain" | 4:08 |
| 5. | "This Way" | 3:50 |
| 6. | "Not Worth Today" | 3:56 |
| 7. | "Shadows" | 4:20 |
| 8. | "Let Me Be" | 6:14 |
| 9. | "Starting to Like This" | 3:29 |
| 10. | "Lilly of the Lake" | 4:34 |
| 11. | "Make You Hurt" | 3:37 |
| 12. | "What Makes Things" | 5:11 |

== Personnel ==
- Hana Pestle — lead vocals
- Marty O'Brien — bass
- Produced by Ben Moody and Michael Herring
- Strings arranged and conducted by David Campbell
