= Hana (EP) =

EP by Hana
- Released: March 25, 2016
- Recorded: 2015
- Genre: Synth-pop; electronic
- Length: 22:43
- Label: Self-released
- Producer: Hana Pestle; BloodPop

Hana chronology
For the Sky (2011)	Hana (2016)	Hanadriel (2019)

Singles from Hana
- 1. "Clay" Released: May 9, 2015; 2. "Avalanche" Released: July 7, 2015; 3. "Underwater" Released: March 8, 2016

Hana (stylized as HANA) is the self-titled debut EP by American singer, songwriter and producer Hana. The EP was self-released on March 25, 2016. Music videos for "Underwater", "Chimera", and "Avalanche" were featured in a short film alongside videos from Grimes' album Art Angels, entitled The Acid Reign Chronicles. The short film was released on October 5, 2016.

== Singles ==
"Clay" was released as the EP's first single on May 9, 2015, via SoundCloud, and an accompanying music video was released on February 18, 2016. "Avalanche" was released as the second single on July 7. "Underwater" was later released as the EP's third single on March 8, 2016. All three songs were accompanied by official music videos uploaded to Pestle's YouTube channel.

== Track listing ==
- All Tracks produced by HANA and BloodPop.

No.	Title	Writer(s)	Length
1.	"Clay"	Hana Pestle; Michael Tucker	5:04
2.	"Avalanche"	Pestle; Tucker	3:50
3.	"Underwater"	Pestle; Tucker	4:17
4.	"White"	Pestle	3:36
5.	"Chimera"	Pestle	5:56
Total length:			22:43
