= Whatever's Clever! =

Studio album by Charlie Puth
- Released: March 27, 2026
- Genre: Pop
- Length: 37:59
- Languages: English; Japanese
- Label: Atlantic
- Producers: BloodPop; Charlie Puth

Charlie Puth chronology
Charlie (2022)	Whatever's Clever! (2026)

Singles from Whatever's Clever!
- 1. "Changes" Released: October 16, 2025; 2. "Beat Yourself Up" Released: January 16, 2026; 3. "Home" Released: March 9, 2026; 4. "Sideways" Released: March 27, 2026

Whatever's Clever! is the fourth studio album by the American singer-songwriter Charlie Puth, released on March 27, 2026, through Atlantic Records. Produced by Puth and BloodPop, the album features guest appearances from Kenny G, Ravyn Lenae, Hikaru Utada, Coco Jones, Michael McDonald, Kenny Loggins, and Jeff Goldblum.

Whatever's Clever! serves as a follow-up to his third studio album, Charlie (2022), and his four-night Blue Note Jazz Club residency in 2025. It is supported by a world tour and four singles: "Changes", "Beat Yourself Up", "Home", and "Sideways".

== Background and release ==
Puth first gave fans a preview of the album via the first show of a four-night residency at the Blue Note Jazz Club in New York, where he played "Changes" and "Beat Yourself Up." He debuted a third song, "Sideways," during a follow-up Blue Note residency in Los Angeles.

Whatever's Clever! was announced on October 16, 2025, alongside the first single, "Changes", with an initial album release date of March 6, 2026. It was announced alongside an announcement that Puth's wife, Brooke Sansone, was pregnant. During an interview with ABC News, Puth stated that people can "expect the truth" on Whatever's Clever!. "It's fun because I'm always figuring out what the sound is going to be first and then I fill in the lyrics after," he said. He described this approach as a change in his formula, saying, "This album is the first time where I'm putting life first and letting melody follow." The album is available on CD, LP, and cassette as well as streaming.

In January 2026, the release date of the album was pushed back to March 27, 2026. That same month, "Beat Yourself Up" was released as the album's second single. "Cry" with Kenny G was released on February 6, 2026, ahead of his performance at Super Bowl LX. It was issued as a promotional single. The album's third single, the Hikaru Utada-assisted "Home" was released on March 9, 2026, while the Coco Jones-assisted "Sideways" was serviced to radio airplay on March 27.

== Critical reception ==
Professional ratings
Aggregate scores
Source	Rating
Metacritic	78/100
Review scores
Source	Rating
AllMusic	4/5 stars
Associated Press	3/5 stars
Paste	B−
PopMatters	8/10
Rolling Stone	3.5/5 stars

According to the review aggregator Metacritic, Whatever's Clever! received "generally favorable reviews" based on a weighted average score of 78 out of 100 from 4 critic scores. Jon Dolan of Rolling Stone called the album Puth's "best work yet".

Sam Rosenberg of Paste Magazine described Whatever's Clever! as a "bright and bouncy" record that shows greater thematic maturity and sonic refinement, highlighting its focus on adulthood and personal change.

Cedric Joshua of Melodic Magazine praised its commitment to an authentic 1980s-inspired sound, blending soft rock and yacht rock influences with polished pop production. Writing for Showbiz by PS, Tim Strong commended the album's high-quality production and smooth vocals, while noting that its nostalgic style can feel somewhat diluted and its lyrics remain relatively safe.

== Track listing ==
All tracks produced by Charlie Puth and BloodPop, with the exception of "Reply to This", which is produced solely by Puth.

Standard edition
No.	Title	Writer(s)	Length
1.	"Changes"	Puth; BloodPop	3:04
2.	"Beat Yourself Up"	Puth; BloodPop	2:58
3.	"Cry" (featuring Kenny G)	Puth; Kenny G; BloodPop	3:07
4.	"Washed Up"	Puth; BloodPop	3:00
5.	"New Jersey" (featuring Ravyn Lenae)	Puth; Lenae; BloodPop	2:15
6.	"Don't Meet Your Heroes"	Puth; BloodPop	3:18
7.	"Home" (featuring Hikaru Utada)	Puth; Utada; BloodPop	3:44
8.	"Hey Brother"	Puth; BloodPop	3:24
9.	"Sideways" (featuring Coco Jones)	Puth; BloodPop; Courtney Jones	3:55
10.	"Love in Exile" (featuring Michael McDonald and Kenny Loggins)	Puth; Loggins; McDonald; BloodPop	3:17
11.	"Until It Happens to You" (featuring Jeff Goldblum & the Mildred Snitzer Orchestra)	Puth; BloodPop; Goldblum	3:23
12.	"I Used to Be Cringe"	Puth; BloodPop	2:34
Total length:			37:59

Limited edition CD and expanded edition bonus track
No.	Title	Writer(s)	Length
13.	"Reply to This"	Puth; Jacob Kasher; Scott Harris	2:58
Total length:			40:57

Japanese exclusive bonus track
No.	Title	Length
13.	"Holding on for Dear Life"	3:16
Total length:		41:05

== Credits and personnel ==
Credits adapted from Tidal.

=== Musicians ===
- Charlie Puth – vocals, keyboards, programming
- Michael McDonald – vocals (track 10)
- Kenny Loggins – vocals (track 10)
- Pastor Funk – bass
- Stanley Rudolph – drums
- Curt Chambers – guitar
- Leddie Garcia – percussion
- BloodPop – programming
- Ashley Morgan – choir vocals (tracks 1, 3, 4, 11)
- David Lee – choir vocals (1, 3, 4, 11)
- Eric Copeland II – choir vocals (1, 3, 4, 11)
- LaKesha Nugent – choir vocals (1, 3, 4, 11)
- Rachel Gonzalez – choir vocals (1, 3, 4, 11)
- Revel Day – choir vocals (1, 3, 4, 11)
- Ronald O'Hannon – choir vocals (1, 3, 4, 11)
- Whitney Wood – choir vocals (1, 3, 4, 11)
- Steve Hackman – orchestra leader, orchestra management (2, 4, 6, 7, 9–11)
- Brad Ritchie – orchestration (2, 4, 6, 7, 9–11)
- Jeff Driskill – saxophone (2, 4, 11)
- Ido Meshulam – trombone (2, 4, 11)
- Rob Schaer – trumpet (2, 4, 11)
- Wayne Bergeron – trumpet (2, 4, 11)
- Katie Sloan – concertmaster, violin (2, 6, 7, 9, 10)
- Adam Millstein – violin (2, 6, 7, 9, 10)
- Ji Young An – violin (2, 6, 7, 9, 10)
- Kerenza Peacock – violin (2, 6, 7, 9, 10)
- Mark Robertson – violin (2, 6, 7, 9, 10)
- Maya Magub – violin (2, 6, 7, 9), viol (10)
- Michael Siess – violin (2, 6, 7, 9, 10)
- Misha Vayman – violin (2, 6, 7, 9, 10)
- Radu Pieptea – violin (2, 6, 7, 9, 10)
- Sara Parkins – violin (2, 6, 7, 9, 10)
- Stephanie Yu – violin (2, 6, 7, 9, 10)
- Carolyn Riley – viola (2, 6, 7, 9, 10)
- Corinne Sobolewski – viola (2, 6, 7, 9, 10)
- Drew Forde – viola (2, 6, 7, 9, 10)
- Emily Williams – viola (2, 6, 7, 9, 10)
- Ben Lash – cello (2, 6, 7, 9, 10)
- Christopher Ahn – cello (2, 6, 7, 9, 10)
- Juan-Salvador Carrasco – cello (2, 6, 9, 10)
- William Nathan Farrington – double bass (2, 6, 9, 10)
- Thanh Tran – orchestration (2, 7, 10)
- Joy Payton-Stevens – cello (2, 10)
- Kenny G – featured saxophone (3)
- Sophie Giuliani – guitar (4, 8)
- Coco Jones — featured vocals (9)
- Ravyn Lenae – featured vocals (5)
- Mia Barcia Colombo – cello (6, 7, 9)
- Hikaru Utada – featured vocals (7)
- Akira Miyake – vocal direction (7)
- Jeff Goldblum – vocals (11)
- Mauro Mengotto – drums (6)
- Antoine Bourachot – drums (4, 7, 8, 9)

=== Technical ===
- Charlie Puth – production, mixing
- BloodPop – production
- Ben Sedano – engineering
- Damien Lewis – engineering (1)
- Yuva Saito – vocal engineering (7)
- Eric Eylands – engineering assistance
- Manny Marroquin – mixing
- Ramiro Fernandez-Seoane – mixing assistance
- Zach Pereyra – mastering

== Charts ==
Chart performance
Chart (2026)	Peak position
Australian Albums (ARIA)	33
Belgian Albums (Ultratop Flanders)	133
Belgian Albums (Ultratop Wallonia)	76
Croatian International Albums (HDU)	6
French Physical Albums (SNEP)	64
Hungarian Physical Albums (MAHASZ)	11
Japanese Digital Albums (Oricon)	7
Japanese Hot Albums (Billboard Japan)	35
Japanese Western Albums (Oricon)	15
New Zealand Albums (RMNZ)	33
Scottish Albums (Official Charts)	45
UK Albums Sales (OCC)	25
US Billboard 200	46
