= Friends (Justin Bieber and BloodPop song) =

Single by Justin Bieber and BloodPop
- Released: August 17, 2017
- Genre: Pop; electro; EDM
- Length: 3:09
- Label: Genpop; RBMG; Schoolboy; Def Jam; Republic
- Songwriters: Justin Bieber; Michael Tucker; Justin Tranter; Julia Michaels
- Producer: BloodPop

Justin Bieber singles chronology
"2U" (2017)	"Friends" (2017)	"Hard 2 Face Reality" (2018)

BloodPop singles chronology
"Friends" (2017)	"Capital Letters" (2018)

Audio videos
- "Friends" on YouTube; "Friends" (remix) on YouTube

"Friends" is a song by Canadian singer Justin Bieber and American record producer BloodPop. It was released through Genpop Corporation, RBMG Records, School Boy Records, Def Jam Recordings and Republic Records as a single on August 17, 2017. Bieber and BloodPop wrote the song alongside Justin Tranter and Julia Michaels, with production solely handled by BloodPop. "Friends" peaked at number two on the UK Singles Chart and number 20 on the Billboard Hot 100. On October 20, 2017, Bieber and BloodPop released a remix of the song, which features Michaels.

== Background ==
In July 2017, Bieber played fans a clip of the song at Milan Airport. On August 13, 2017, Bieber first teased the single by tweeting the line: "Can we still be friends". The following day, Bieber announced an upcoming release on social media, the accompanied artwork featured a monochrome illustration of two birds tearing apart a worm in front of highlighter yellow text, captioning: "New music. Thursday noon". Justin Tranter and Julia Michaels later revealed on social media that they co-wrote the single alongside Bieber and BloodPop.

== Critical reception ==
Spencer Kornhaber of The Atlantic called the single "sleek electro" and "the zillionth child of the Eurythmics' "Sweet Dreams (Are Made of This)" to approach the public in the past three decades". He wrote that BloodPop provided "an insistent beat", "a tight verse-prechorus-chorus structure" and "an on-trend wordless hook". Jordan Sargent of Spin thinks that the four songwriters "seem to nod overtly at that song", and that the song "has the same little between-beat drum fills as 'Sorry', as well as its pitched-up vocal counterpoints". Brittany Spanos of Rolling Stone felt that Bieber "traded in the tropical house leanings of his previous solo hits for a more pop direction" with this song. Maeve McDermott of USA Today opined that the song "finally jailbreaks Bieber from the soulless trop-house prison of his other EDM one-offs". Phil Witmer of Vice wrote that the song "pretty much sounds like a synth-disco remix" of "Sorry", in which "the chord progression is the exact same". Beatrice Hazlehurst of Paper called the song "a shameless club banger".

== Commercial performance ==
In Canada, "Friends" charted on the Canadian Hot 100 within a day of release, debuting at number 96 and jumping to number 4 the following week, marking Bieber's 19th top 10 song. It received a double platinum certification from Music Canada for more than 80,000 downloads in the country. In the United States, the song had 16,000 downloads counted only on its release day. The following week, the single debuted at US Adult Contemporary (No. 28), Adult Top 40 (No. 17), Dance Club Songs (No. 42), Mainstream Top 40 (No. 11) and Rhythmic (No. 19). Consequently, it debuted and peaked at No. 20 on the Billboard Hot 100 with 32 million impressions on the radio, 39,000 downloads and 13.3 million streams and being his 23rd Top 20 in the country. It also received a platinum certification by the Recording Industry Association of America (RIAA).

In Europe, the song debuted at the top of the charts in Denmark, Norway and Slovakia, dethroning the remix of "Despacito" by Luis Fonsi and Daddy Yankee, which features Bieber, in the second place of five nationalities, including the United Kingdom, in addition to the top 10 of fourteen. He has received platinum certifications from the Federazione Industria Musicale Italiana (FIMI), gold from the Belgian Entertainment Association (BEA), IFPI Denmark, Bundesverband Musikindustrie (BVMI), Productores de Música de España (PROMUSICAE), the Swedish Recording Industry Association (GLF) and the British Phonographic Industry (BPI). In Oceania, "Friends" reached at number two both in Australia and New Zealand, receiving double platinum certifications from the Australian Recording Industry Association (ARIA) and gold from Recorded Music NZ (RMNZ).

== Credits and personnel ==
Credits adapted from Tidal.

- Justin Bieber – vocals, songwriting
- BloodPop – production, songwriting, keyboard, background vocals, bass, synthesizer
- Julia Michaels – songwriting, background vocals
- Justin Tranter – songwriting
- Josh Gudwin – engineering, recording engineering
- Michael Freeman – mixing assistance
- Spike Stent – mixing

== Charts ==
=== Weekly charts ===
Chart (2017–2018)	Peak position
Argentina (Monitor Latino)	16
Australia (ARIA)	2
Austria (Ö3 Austria Top 40)	2
Belgium (Ultratop 50 Flanders)	15
Belgium (Ultratop 50 Wallonia)	27
Canada Hot 100 (Billboard)	4
Canada AC (Billboard)	26
Canada CHR/Top 40 (Billboard)	15
Canada Hot AC (Billboard)	25
Colombia (National-Report)	77
Costa Rica (Monitor Latino)	12
Croatia International Airplay (Top lista)	10
Czech Republic Airplay (ČNS IFPI)	24
Czech Republic Singles Digital (ČNS IFPI)	3
Denmark (Tracklisten)	1
Ecuador (National-Report)	49
El Salvador (Monitor Latino)	11
Euro Digital Songs (Billboard)	3
Finland (Suomen virallinen lista)	2
France (SNEP)	36
Germany (GfK)	4
Greece Digital (Billboard)	2
Honduras (Monitor Latino)	5
Hungary (Rádiós Top 40)	16
Hungary (Single Top 40)	5
Hungary (Stream Top 40)	3
Ireland (IRMA)	4
Israel International TV Airplay (Media Forest)	1
Italy (FIMI)	10
Japan Hot 100 (Billboard)	22
Latvia Streaming (LaIPA)	59
Lebanon (Lebanese Top 20)	1
Malaysia (RIM)	5
Mexico (Billboard Mexican Airplay)	5
Netherlands (Dutch Top 40)	6
Netherlands (Mega Top 50)	11
Netherlands (Single Top 100)	5
New Zealand (Recorded Music NZ)	2
Norway (VG-lista)	1
Panama (Monitor Latino)	14
Poland Airplay (ZPAV)	43
Portugal (AFP)	6
Scottish Singles Sales (Official Charts)	4
Slovakia Airplay (ČNS IFPI)	27
Slovakia Singles Digital (ČNS IFPI)	1
Slovenia (SloTop50)	5
Spain (Promusicae)	3
Sweden (Sverigetopplistan)	2
Switzerland (Schweizer Hitparade)	3
UK Singles (Official Charts)	2
Uruguay (Monitor Latino)	12
US Billboard Hot 100	20
US Adult Contemporary (Billboard)	25
US Adult Pop Airplay (Billboard)	17
US Dance Club Songs (Billboard)	42
US Dance Airplay (Billboard)	6
US Pop Airplay (Billboard)	11
US Rhythmic Airplay (Billboard)	19
Venezuela (National-Report)	44

=== Year-end charts ===
Chart (2017)	Position
Australia (ARIA)	63
Austria (Ö3 Austria Top 40)	63
Brazil (Pro-Música Brasil)	197
Canada (Canadian Hot 100)	83
Croatia (HRT Top 40)	77
Denmark (Tracklisten)	45
Germany (Official German Charts)	35
Hungary (Rádiós Top 40)	80
Hungary (Single Top 40)	74
Hungary (Stream Top 40)	50
Italy (FIMI)	95
Latvia Airplay (LaIPA)	70
Netherlands (Dutch Top 40)	45
Netherlands (Single Top 100)	84
Portugal (AFP)	60
Sweden (Sverigetopplistan)	71
Switzerland (Schweizer Hitparade)	83
UK Singles (Official Charts Company)	93
Chart (2018)	Position
Germany (Official German Charts)	56

== Certifications ==
Region	Certification	Certified units/sales
Australia (ARIA)	4× Platinum	280,000^{‡}
Belgium (BRMA)	Gold	10,000^{‡}
Brazil (Pro-Música Brasil)	3× Platinum	180,000^{‡}
Canada (Music Canada)	2× Platinum	160,000^{‡}
Denmark (IFPI Danmark)	2× Platinum	180,000^{‡}
Germany (BVMI)	Platinum	400,000^{‡}
Italy (FIMI)	2× Platinum	100,000^{‡}
Mexico (AMPROFON)	Platinum	60,000^{‡}
New Zealand (RMNZ)	2× Platinum	60,000^{‡}
Norway (IFPI Norway)	2× Platinum	120,000^{‡}
Portugal (AFP)	Platinum	10,000^{‡}
Spain (Promusicae)	Gold	20,000^{‡}
Sweden (GLF)	Gold	20,000^{‡}
United Kingdom (BPI)	Platinum	600,000^{‡}
United States (RIAA)	Platinum	1,000,000^{‡}
^{‡} Sales+streaming figures based on certification alone.

== Release history ==
Region	Date	Format(s)	Label(s)	Ref.
Various	August 17, 2017	Digital download; streaming	Genpop; RBMG; Schoolboy; Def Jam; Republic	
Italy	August 18, 2017	Contemporary hit radio	Universal	
United Kingdom	August 19, 2017	Contemporary hit radio	Virgin EMI	
United States	August 22, 2017	Contemporary hit radio	RBMG; School Boy; Def Jam; Republic	
United States	August 22, 2017	Rhythmic contemporary radio	RBMG; School Boy; Def Jam; Republic	
