= Changes (Charlie Puth song) =

Single by Charlie Puth

from the album Whatever's Clever!
- Released: October 16, 2025
- Genre: Pop
- Length: 3:04
- Label: Atlantic
- Songwriters: Puth; BloodPop
- Producers: Puth; BloodPop

Charlie Puth singles chronology
"December 25th" (2025)	"Changes" (2025)	"Beat Yourself Up" (2026)

Music video
- "Changes" on YouTube

"Changes" is a song by Charlie Puth, released as the lead single from his fourth studio album Whatever's Clever! on October 16, 2025.

== Background ==
Puth first previewed "Changes" on August 6, 2025, during the second episode of a series he had recently started titled "Professor Puth" where he would teach viewers about music. In the video, he explains why he has so many keyboards in his room, showing a CP70 piano where he plays "Godspeed" by Frank Ocean alongside "Changes", which had not yet been released and had no title. In an Instagram post, Puth stated why he was excited to share the song, writing it was the "perfect way to bring all of you into the most beautiful, colorful part of my life, which happens to be right now," ominously stating that "You will soon know why..."

== Composition and lyrics ==
Changes is an 1980s pop inspired song about changes in one's life, specifically referring to Puth's marriage to Brooke Sansone and the announcement of her pregnancy, which they formally announced near the end of the music video for "Changes".

== Music video ==
The music video for "Changes" was directed by the English director Charlotte Rutherford. It uses claymation, a type of animation that utilizes stop motion and clay figures.

== Release and reception ==
Upon release, "Changes" became a small hit, peaking at number 15 on New Zealand's Hot Singles Chart. Critics including Fran Hoepfner of Vulture noted a "charming PBS feel" in the song, likening the song to the music of the band Toto and Harry Styles' "Late Night Talking". In a 2025 Billboard poll, 32% of voters picked "Changes" as their favorite new song.

== Credits and personnel ==
Adapted from Tidal:

=== Performers ===
- Charlie Puth – vocals, keyboards, writer, programming, mixer, producer
- Pastor Funk – bass
- Stanley Randolph – drums
- Curt Chambers – guitar
- Leddie Garcia – percussion
- Ashley Morgan – choir vocals
- David Lee – choir vocals
- Eric Copeland II – choir vocals
- LaKesha Nugent – choir vocals
- Rachel Gonzales – choir vocals
- Revel Day – choir vocals
- Ronald O'Hannon – choir vocals
- Whitney Wood – choir vocals

=== Technical ===
- BloodPop – producer, writer, programming
- Ben Sadano – engineer
- Damien Lewis – recording engineer
- Manny Marroquin – mixer
- Ramiro Fernandez-Seoane – assistant mixer
- Zach Pereyra – masterer

== Charts ==
=== Weekly charts ===
Weekly chart performance
Chart (2025–2026)	Peak position
Argentina Anglo Airplay (Monitor Latino)	15
Croatia International Airplay (Top lista)	83
Denmark Airplay (Tracklisten)	8
Estonia Airplay (TopHit)	42
Germany Airplay (BVMI)	74
Lithuania Airplay (TopHit)	20
Malta Airplay (Radiomonitor)	19
Mexico Anglo Airplay (Monitor Latino)	18
New Zealand Hot Singles (RMNZ)	16
Panama Anglo Airplay (Monitor Latino)	8
Paraguay Airplay (Monitor Latino)	16
Puerto Rico Anglo Airplay (Monitor Latino)	8
Romania Airplay (TopHit)	90
Suriname (Nationale Top 40)	7
Switzerland Airplay (IFPI)	12
US Adult Contemporary (Billboard)	22
US Adult Pop Airplay (Billboard)	13
Uruguay Anglo Airplay (Monitor Latino)	15

=== Monthly charts ===
List of monthly chart performance
Chart (2025)	Peak position
Estonia Airplay (TopHit)	51
Lithuania Airplay (TopHit)	25
