= Something to Tell You =

Studio album by Haim
- Released: July 7, 2017
- Studio: Valentine Recording Studios (Valley Village, Los Angeles, California); Ariel Rechtshaid's studio (Burbank, California)
- Genre: Pop rock
- Length: 42:38
- Label: Columbia
- Producer: Ariel Rechtshaid; Rostam Batmanglij; Twin Shadow

Haim chronology
Days Are Gone (2013)	Something to Tell You (2017)	Women in Music Pt. III (2020)

Singles from Something to Tell You
- 1. "Want You Back" Released: May 3, 2017; 2. "Little of Your Love" Released: June 18, 2017; 3. "Nothing's Wrong" Released: August 21, 2017

Something to Tell You is the second studio album by American pop rock band Haim. It was released on July 7, 2017, by Columbia Records. The album's lead single, "Want You Back", was released on May 3, 2017, followed by the release of the promotional single "Right Now". On May 10, the album cover was revealed, along with the preorder announcement. "Little of Your Love" was then announced as the second single on June 18, 2017, via Twitter. "Nothing's Wrong" was released as the third single on August 21, 2017.

== Background and recording ==
Haim toured for two years to support their previous release, Days Are Gone, the three sisters' 2013 debut album that was met with a great deal of critical and commercial success. With the conclusion of their tour came the beginning of the process of crafting Something to Tell You: "All we knew for two years was wake up, soundcheck, play the show, go to sleep and fit in a slice of pizza at some point. We needed to turn our brains from touring brains back to writing brains. When we came home, we literally got off the bus, took a nap and went right into the studio." The initial sessions for the album were unfruitful; the band questioned the quality of the songs, wondering if they were on par with the debut album. However, a breakthrough came after the producers of the 2015 Judd Apatow–directed romantic comedy Trainwreck asked the band to write a song for the film's soundtrack. "Little of Your Love", the album's second single, was produced in under a week at the film producers' request, and although it was ultimately not selected for the soundtrack, completing the song gave the band the confidence they needed to write new material for the album.

In the following years, the band developed the album, taking breaks and continuing to perform at various shows and festivals, much of which would further inspire the album. During the production of the album, Ariel Rechtshaid, one of the producers and Danielle Haim's partner, was diagnosed with testicular cancer. His diagnosis is cited by the band as the reason for the four-year delay between their first and second album as they halted production while Rechtshaid underwent treatment. The band switched between Valentine Studios, an infrequently used 1970's production facility in Valley Village (a neighborhood in Los Angeles, California), and Rechtshaid's home studio.

== Promotion ==
"Want You Back" was released as the album's first single on May 3, 2017, and was followed a week later by the promotional single, "Right Now". On May 13, the band performed "Want You Back" along with "Little of Your Love" on Saturday Night Live.

Director Paul Thomas Anderson filmed a documentary about the making of the album. Titled Valentine, the film was first screened in July 2017, before being officially uploaded to the internet that September. Anderson would go on to direct music videos for three of the album's tracks "Right Now", "Little of Your Love", and a live version of "Night So Long". Anderson became interested in the group after learning that the sisters were the daughters of one of his former art teachers.

They made their first UK appearance at BBC Radio 1's Big Weekend on May 27, performing "Want You Back" and "Right Now" as part of their set.

The trio also embarked on their second headlining tour, the Sister Sister Sister Tour which begun on April 3, 2018.

== Critical reception ==
Professional ratings
Aggregate scores
Source	Rating
Metacritic	69/100
Review scores
Source	Rating
AllMusic	3/5 stars
Clash	7/10
Entertainment Weekly	A−
The Guardian	3/5 stars
The Independent	1/5 stars
NME	4/5 stars
Pitchfork	7.8/10
Rolling Stone	3.5/5 stars
Slant Magazine	2.5/5 stars
Uncut	3/5 stars

Something to Tell You received a mostly positive reception from music critics. At Metacritic, which assigns a normalized rating out of 100 to reviews from mainstream critics, the album has an average score of 69 out of 100 based on 30 reviews, which indicates "generally favorable" reception.

Writing for Pitchfork, Jenn Pelly said, "No other rock band in popular music (an anomalous statement already) has mixed styles so seamlessly—rattling and gliding from one hook to another...Haim's latticed arrangements and heavily percussive melodies make their music fly." Pelly as well as several other reviewers stressed the influence of Stevie Nicks and other 1970s and '80s rock; in the Los Angeles Times, Mikael Wood said the album "makes you believe that rock might have a future," bearing "the polished sound of vintage Fleetwood Mac and the Eagles, and here the sisters continue to rely on guitars and the like at a moment when many of their peers have little use for them." In Rolling Stone, Jon Dolan said, "You can hear the studied sense of craft all over Something to Tell You...These songs don't always explode with the sunny ebullience of the first LP, but the melodies, beats and ideas are layered and piled high." In The Guardian, Kitty Empire writes, "Haim really know what they are doing. There are digressions to kill for here, what you might once have called middle eights, indefatigable melodies, and weird little noises – a horse neigh and a seagull coda on Want You Back, a fax machine on Found It in Silence, the gasping on Nothing's Wrong – to keep you clamping your headphones to your ears in delight."

Elsewhere, the album received some mixed from some critics, who deemed it inferior to their debut. Sam Wolfson of The Guardian reported that some reviewers criticized the band's 80s and 90s influences for overwhelming their vocals.

== Commercial performance ==
Something to Tell You debuted at number seven on the US Billboard 200 with 32,000 album-equivalent units, of which 26,000 were pure album sales. It also debuted at No. 2 on the UK Albums Chart, selling 18,319 copies in its first week. Billboard noted that the album failed to generate a hit single, despite strong reviews and significant media attention.

== Track listing ==
No.	Title	Writer(s)	Producer(s)	Length
1.	"Want You Back"	Alana Haim; Danielle Haim; Este Haim; Ariel Rechtshaid	Rechtshaid; BloodPop^{[a]}	3:52
2.	"Nothing's Wrong"	A. Haim; D. Haim; E. Haim; Rechtshaid	Rechtshaid	3:09
3.	"Little of Your Love"	A. Haim; D. Haim; E. Haim; Rechtshaid	Rechtshaid; Rostam Batmanglij^{[a]}	3:33
4.	"Ready for You"	A. Haim; D. Haim; E. Haim; Rechtshaid; George Lewis Jr.	Rechtshaid; Twin Shadow	3:45
5.	"Something to Tell You"	A. Haim; D. Haim; E. Haim; Rechtshaid	Rechtshaid	4:13
6.	"You Never Knew"	A. Haim; D. Haim; E. Haim; Rechtshaid; Dev Hynes	Rechtshaid	4:29
7.	"Kept Me Crying"	A. Haim; D. Haim; E. Haim; Rechtshaid; Batmanglij	Rechtshaid; Batmanglij	3:55
8.	"Found It in Silence"	A. Haim; D. Haim; E. Haim; Rechtshaid	Rechtshaid; Batmanglij^{[a]}	4:23
9.	"Walking Away"	A. Haim; D. Haim; E. Haim; Batmanglij	Batmanglij	3:56
10.	"Right Now"	A. Haim; D. Haim; E. Haim; Rechtshaid	Rechtshaid	4:15
11.	"Night So Long"	A. Haim; D. Haim; E. Haim; Rechtshaid	Rechtshaid	3:04
Total length:				42:34

LP and Japan bonus track
No.	Title	Writer(s)	Producer(s)	Length
12.	"Water's Running Dry"	A. Haim; D. Haim; E. Haim; Batmanglij	Batmanglij	3:45

Notes

- ^{^[a]} signifies an additional producer

== Personnel ==
Credits adapted from AllMusic and album's liner notes.

Haim

- Alana Haim – vocals (tracks 1–9, 12), guitar (2, 3, 5–7, 10), percussion (2–5), keyboards (8)
- Danielle Haim – vocals (all tracks), guitar (1–8, 11), drums (1–8, 10, 12), percussion (2, 4–6, 8), Hi-hat (9), synthesizer (10), glass bottle (9)
- Este Haim – vocals (tracks 1–10, 12), bass guitar (1–3, 5–10, 12), percussion (4)

Musicians

- Rostam Batmanglij – acoustic guitar (tracks 8, 12), drum programming (7), electric guitar (12), harmonizer (7), Moog Bass (12), piano (7), rhythm guitar (7), synthesizer (7, 8, 12)
- Matt Bauder – saxophone (track 3)
- Andrew Bulbrook – violin (track 12)
- Lenny Castro – congas (track 5)
- Devonté Hynes – DX7 electric piano (track 6)
- Jim-E Stack – keyboards (track 1)
- Tommy King – bass synth (tracks 4, 5), CP70 (5), organ (7, 8, 10), piano (2, 3), synthesizer (2, 5, 11)
- Greg Leisz – guitar (tracks 1, 3), pedal steel guitar (10), slide guitar (12)
- George Lewis Jr. – guitar (track 4)
- Roger Manning – synthesizer (track 3)
- Serena McKinney – violin (track 8)
- David Moyer – saxophone (track 3)
- Nico Muhly – prepared piano and strings (track 10)
- Mike Olsen – cello (track 8)
- Owen Pallett – viola (track 8)
- Ariel Rechtshaid – acoustic guitar (tracks 2, 4, 6), background vocals (8), celeste (11), guitar (5), keyboards (1), marimba (11), organ (3, 7), percussion (3, 5, 6, 8, 10), piano (10), rhythm guitar (7), synthesizer (2, 4–8, 10, 11), vocoder (6)
- Buddy Ross – dulcimer (track 2), Fender Rhodes (2, 6), keyboards (1), percussion (5), synthesizer (2, 6, 10)
- Gus Seyffert – percussion (track 2)
- Ruud Wiener – Simmons Silicon Mallet (track 6)

Technical personnel

- Chris Allgood – assistant mastering engineer
- Rostam Batmanglij – additional production (tracks 3, 8), engineer (7, 9, 12), producer (7, 9, 12), string arrangements (12)
- BloodPop – additional production (track 1)
- Martin Cooke – assistant engineer (tracks 1–6, 8, 10, 11)
- Rich Costey – mixing (tracks 1–6, 8, 10, 11)
- Laura Coulson – photography
- John DeBold – engineer (tracks 1–6, 8, 10, 11)
- Scott Desmarais – assistant mixing engineer (track 9)
- Robin Florent – assistant mixing engineer (track 9)
- Nicolas Fournier – assistant engineer (tracks 1–6, 8, 10, 11)
- Dave Fridmann – mixing (track 7)
- Chris Galland – mixing engineer (track 9)
- Michael Harris – engineer (tracks 1, 3, 7, 12)
- Chris Kasych – engineer (tracks 1–6, 8, 10, 11)
- Emily Lazar – mastering
- George Lewis Jr. – producer (track 4)
- Ted Lovett – creative director
- Manny Marroquin – mixing (track 9)
- Serena McKinney – string arrangements (track 8)
- Rob Orton – mixing (track 12)
- Ariel Rechtshaid – drum programming (track 7), engineer (1–8, 10, 11), producer (1–8, 10, 11), programming (1–6, 8), string arrangements (8)
- Nick Rowe – engineer (tracks 1–9, 11, 12)
- David Schiffman – engineer (tracks 1–7, 10, 12)
- Gus Seyffert – engineer (tracks 2, 3)

== Charts ==
=== Weekly charts ===
Chart (2017)	Peak position
Australian Albums (ARIA)	4
Austrian Albums (Ö3 Austria)	56
Belgian Albums (Ultratop Flanders)	17
Belgian Albums (Ultratop Wallonia)	122
Canadian Albums (Billboard)	11
Dutch Albums (Album Top 100)	46
German Albums (Offizielle Top 100)	44
Greek Albums (IFPI)	61
Irish Albums (IRMA)	4
New Zealand Albums (RMNZ)	11
Scottish Albums (OCC)	2
Spanish Albums (Promusicae)	37
Swedish Albums (Sverigetopplistan)	41
Swiss Albums (Schweizer Hitparade)	26
UK Albums (OCC)	2
US Billboard 200	7
US Top Alternative Albums (Billboard)	2
US Top Rock Albums (Billboard)	2

=== Year-end charts ===
Chart (2017)	Position
US Top Rock Albums (Billboard)	96

== Certifications ==
Region	Certification	Certified units/sales
United Kingdom (BPI)	Silver	60,000^{‡}
^{‡} Sales+streaming figures based on certification alone.

== Release history ==
List of regions, release dates, formats, label and references
Region	Date	Format(s)	Label	Ref.
Various	July 7, 2017	CD; LP; digital download; music streaming	Columbia Records	
