= Little of Your Love =

Single by Haim

from the album Something to Tell You
- Released: June 18, 2017
- Recorded: 2017
- Genre: Sunshine pop; pop rock
- Length: 3:33
- Label: Polydor
- Songwriters: Danielle Haim; Este Haim; Alana Haim; Ariel Rechtshaid
- Producers: Ariel Rechtshaid; Rostam Batmanglij; Haim

Haim singles chronology
"Want You Back" (2017)	"Little of Your Love" (2017)	"Nothing's Wrong" (2017)

Music video
- "Little of Your Love" on YouTube

"Little of Your Love" is a song by Haim and the second single off their second album, Something to Tell You. It was released as the follow-up to the single "Want You Back" on June 18, 2017. The music video for the song was directed by Paul Thomas Anderson.

== Background ==
"Little of Your Love" was written for the movie Trainwreck, although it was not used in the movie. Instead the song was later featured on the soundtrack of the 2017 film Lady Bird.

The song was first performed to during the group's summer 2016 tour of North America. It was then entitled by the band "Give Me Just a Little of Your Love", and featured a different musical arrangement and introduction. It also lacked the guitar solo performed on the album version by Danielle at the end of the song, giving it therefore a much shorter length than the released version.

The reworked version of the song was then debuted by the band on May 13, 2017, on an episode of Saturday Night Live. However, it did not lack the studio enhancements of the album version; the band was augmented by two saxophonists and two cellists for this performance.

On June 18, 2017, the group announced via Twitter that the song would debut on BBC Radio One the following day at 7:30 PM UK time. After the broadcast of the song, it became readily available on streaming sites, and was arrived with pre-ordered copies of the album just after.

== BloodPop remix ==
On August 11, a remix by BloodPop was released, intended as the second official single from the album. It marked the second time the band had released an EDM single, following their collaboration with Calvin Harris, "Pray to God". This version of the song was also featured in the racing game Forza Horizon 4.

== Music video ==
The song's music video, directed by Paul Thomas Anderson, was released on October 2, 2017 and features the group line dancing with patrons at the Oil Can Harry's bar in Los Angeles. Pitchfork noted the clip featured similarities to their previous "Want You Back" video.

== Track listing ==
- Digital download — Remixes
1. "Little of Your Love" (BloodPop® Remix) – 3:24
2. "Little of Your Love" (Wookie Remix) – 3:46
3. "Little of Your Love" (Jam City Remix) – 3:02
4. "Little of Your Love" (Jayda G Remix) – 5:10

== Charts ==
Chart (2017)	Peak position
Australia (ARIA)	85
Scotland Singles (Official Charts)	82
Sweden Heatseeker (Sverigetopplistan)	11
UK Singles Downloads (Official Charts)	91
US Adult Pop Airplay (Billboard)	30

== Release history ==
Region	Date	Format	Label	Ref.
Various	18 June 2017	Digital download	Polydor	
United Kingdom	18 August 2017	Contemporary hit radio	Polydor	
United States	18 September 2017	Hot adult contemporary radio	Columbia	
