= Hana (American musician) =

American singer

HANA
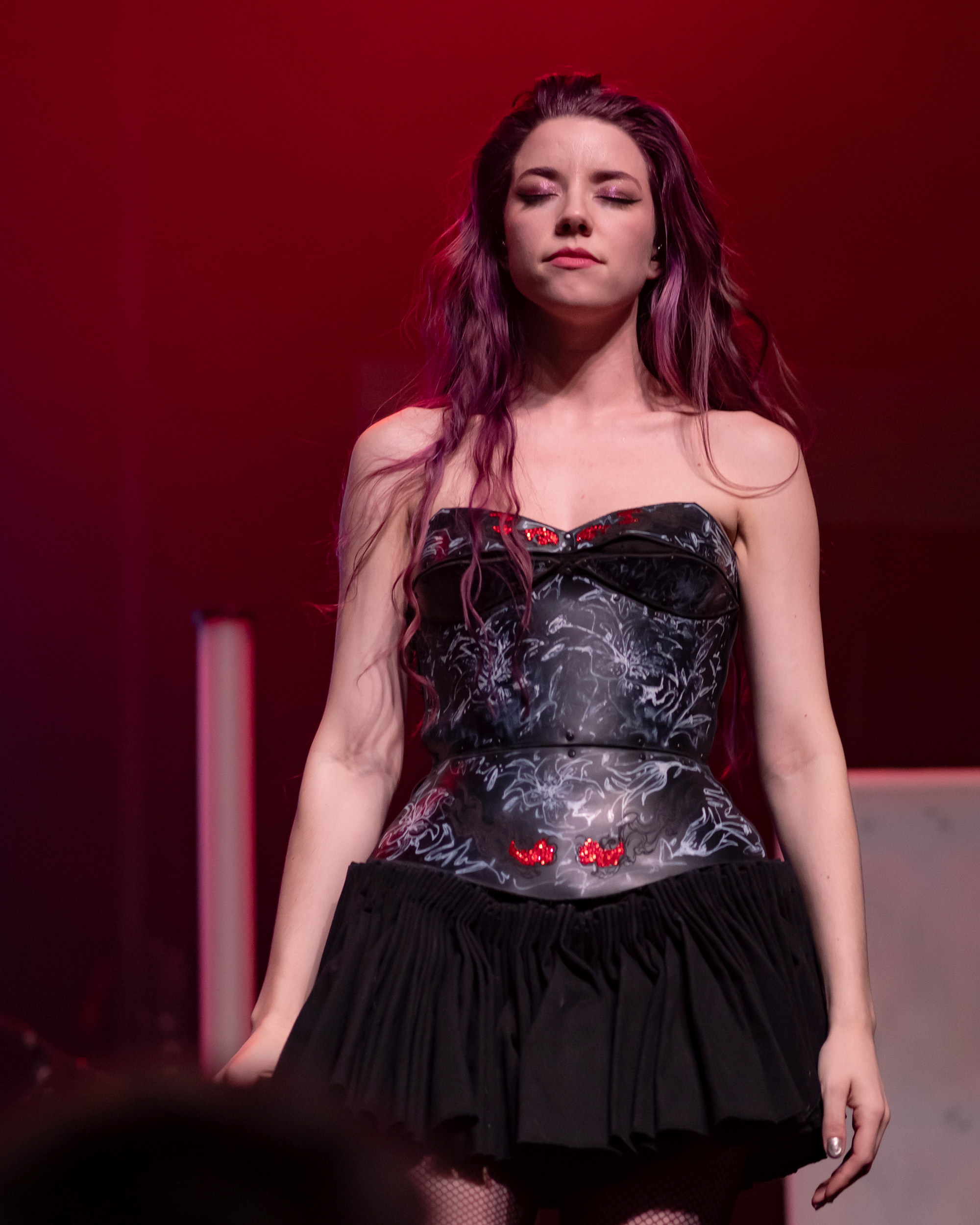
- Hana in 2020

Background information
- Born: Hana Gabrielle Pestle; July 11, 1989 (age 37); Atlanta, Georgia, U.S.
- Origin: Billings, Montana, U.S.
- Genres: Synthpop; indie pop; trance; progressive house
- Occupation: Singer-songwriter
- Years active: 2006–present
- Website: hanatruly.com

Hana Gabrielle Pestle (born July 11, 1989), known mononymously as Hana (/ˈhɒnə/ HON-ə; stylized in all caps), is an American singer, songwriter, producer, and DJ based in Los Angeles.

Hana began working on music in 2006, with the help of producers and writers Ben Moody and Michael "Fish" Herring. Her early work was largely acoustic-based, heavily utilizing her performance on the guitar. During this period, she recorded under her birth name Hana Pestle. She released three extended plays—Hana Pestle (2008), Live in the Studio (2009), and For the Sky (2011)—and her debut studio album, This Way (2009).

In 2013, upon meeting producer BloodPop, Hana chose to take a break from recording to focus on learning production. Dissatisfied with her output, she decided to rebrand herself and change the direction of her music. In 2015, she re-emerged with the single "Clay", changing her recording name to the mononym Hana. Her eponymous debut extended play (2016) under this moniker explored an electronic style. In November 2019, Hana released her second studio album, Hanadriel. The album was made in four weeks, and the creation process was live streamed by herself on Twitch. She's also collaborated with producer Kevin Durante on multiple EPs on the house label Anjunadeep.

In addition to her solo work, she is also known for her frequent work with musician Grimes. Hana has performed as her live backing vocalist and band member, and the pair have collaborated on numerous songs and music videos.

== Early life ==
Hana Pestle was born July 11, 1989, in Atlanta, Georgia. She moved to Salt Lake City, Utah when she was six years old, and to Billings, Montana, when she was eight. Hana received her first guitar, which her parents bought from a garage sale, as a Christmas present when she was in fifth grade. Her parents also got her a piano around the same time. During her youth she took guitar and vocal lessons, and performed in choirs. Hana began performing live at the age of fourteen. She would play at local cafés and book stores in Billings, and at the local farmers' market each weekend.

== Career ==
=== 2005–11: Career beginnings, Hana Pestle, This Way and For the Sky ===
In 2005, a video of Hana performing in Montana reached producers and writers Michael "Fish" Herring and Ben Moody, who subsequently decided they wanted to work with her. Upon discovering Hana, Moody reportedly said of her, "It only took Hana singing one song and I was sold. I have never in my life been more in awe of such a breathtaking natural talent". Hana traveled with her family to Los Angeles to meet with Moody and Herring in 2005, upon which they recorded some demos. She began working with the pair on her debut album in April 2006, while she was a senior in high school. Hana contributed backing vocals to the song "This Time" by Céline Dion, from Dion's 2007 album Taking Chances.

Hana shopped for a record label during 2007, sending her music to labels in Los Angeles and New York. In May 2008, Hana revealed that she had been signed to Ben Moody's new record label, FNR Records. She was the first artist signed to the label, which was created specially to release her debut album. Later that month, she released her first recording effort, an extended play titled Hana Pestle. At the time, Hana was recording under her full name. The self-titled EP is composed of three original songs—"These Two Hands", "Just a Phase", and "Together Forever"—and a cover of Leonard Cohen's "Hallelujah". A music video was released for "These Two Hands".

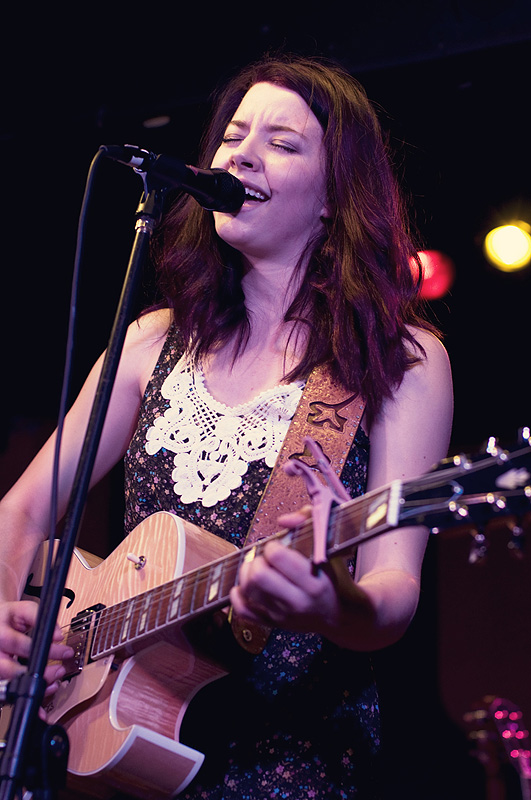
Hana in 2009

In 2008, Hana featured on a new version of Ben Moody's song "Everything Burns". She also contributed backing vocals to all tracks on Moody's debut album All for This, which was released in 2009.

In December 2008, Hana shared a song titled "Need", and began campaigning to have it included in the film The Twilight Saga: New Moon. The ultimately unsuccessful campaign was referred to as "Need for New Moon". "Need" was officially released as Hana's debut single in June 2009. The song's accompanying music video was directed by Norwood Cheek. Also in June 2009, Hana released an extended play titled Live in the Studio. It features live versions of seven tracks, including "These Two Hands" and "Just a Phase" from the Hana Pestle EP, a cover of Radiohead's "Creep", and four new songs from Hana's then-upcoming album. Hana's debut album, This Way, was released in September 2009 through FNR Records. It was produced by Ben Moody and Michael Herring, and incorporates string orchestras; the strings were arranged by composer David Campbell.

In 2011, Hana entered and won a contest held by American rock band Incubus. The contest involved recording a version of the band's song "Promises, Promises"—which had yet to be released—based only on the sheet music. Upon winning, Hana got to perform the song live alongside Incubus members Mike Einziger and Chris Kilmore in July 2011.

Hana released her third extended play, For the Sky, in September 2011. The EP is composed of five original songs.

From 2008–2012, Hana shared various covers via YouTube and SoundCloud. Some of the songs she covered include "First Day of My Life" by Bright Eyes, "Hotel California" by the Eagles, "Back to Black" by Amy Winehouse, "We Found Love" by Rihanna, "Always Be My Baby" by Mariah Carey, "If You Return" by Maximum Balloon, "Eyes Wide Open" by Gotye, "Landslide" by Fleetwood Mac, "River" by Joni Mitchell, and "Wintersong" by Sarah McLachlan.

=== 2013–2018: Change in direction & Hana ===
In 2013, Hana met music producer BloodPop and talked to him about her career. Subsequently, she decided to take a break to learn music production and change the direction of her music. She has since stated that she was dissatisfied with her earlier work. She attributes this to a lack of creative control, saying of her former producers, "they just took my songs and produced them in the way they thought made sense; I never had a heart to heart connection with the production of the songs". Hana chose to take down her social media accounts and website, as well as removing most of her earlier music from the internet, in order to rebrand herself from a clean slate.

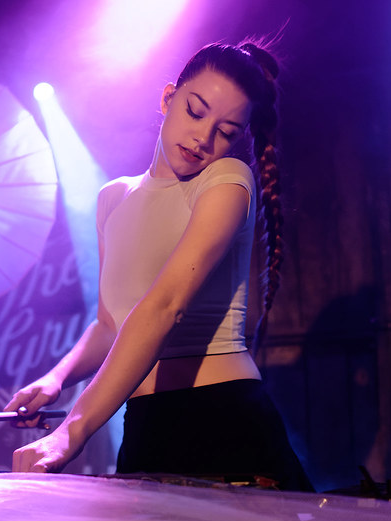
Hana in 2016

After taking a break, Hana re-emerged in 2015, now recording under just her first name. Now producing her own music, Hana changed her style to a more synth-oriented pop sound. In May 2015, she released "Clay"—her first song as Hana—on SoundCloud. The song received praise from fellow female singer-songwriters Grimes and Lorde. Around this time, Hana accompanied Grimes as part of the opening act for Lana Del Rey's Endless Summer Tour. On the final two dates of the tour, Hana played "Clay" during Grimes' set. A video of the performance was filmed by Grimes and Jaime Brooks and shared through YouTube to promote the song. In July 2015, Nylon premiered Hana's second song since her rebrand, "Avalanche".

Hana toured with musician Grimes throughout 2016. She opened for Grimes on the European dates of her AC!D Reign Tour, which took place from February through March. Later that year, the pair embarked on Grimes' March of the Pugs Tour, during which Hana performed alongside Grimes as a backing vocalist and band member.

In March 2016, The Fader premiered Hana's third new single, "Underwater", alongside a video shot on tour. She released her first body of work since rebranding, the self-titled EP HANA, on March 25, 2016.

In October 2016, Hana and Grimes released a video series titled The AC!D Reign Chronicles. It is composed of seven music videos filmed over two weeks in Europe. The songs included are Hana's "Underwater", "Chimera", and "Avalanche" from her Hana EP, and four tracks from Grimes' album Art Angels. The individual music videos were published to Hana and Grimes' respective YouTube channels, and a "Director's Cut" containing all seven videos in their "intended order" was uploaded to Grimes' channel.

In 2017, Hana and Grimes collaborated on a cover of Tegan and Sara's song "Dark Come Soon". They contributed the track to the compilation Tegan and Sara Present the Con X: Covers, which consists of cover versions of the tracks from Tegan and Sara's album The Con. Grimes and Hana are credited as "Trashique".

In July 2018, Hana shared a cover of "Here Comes the Rain Again" by Eurythmics via SoundCloud. She had previously performed the song during live shows, and wanted to release her version so that it could "exist outside a venue".

In November 2018, Hana featured on Grimes' single "We Appreciate Power". She also produced a "nightcore" remix of the song.

=== 2019–present: Hanadriel ===
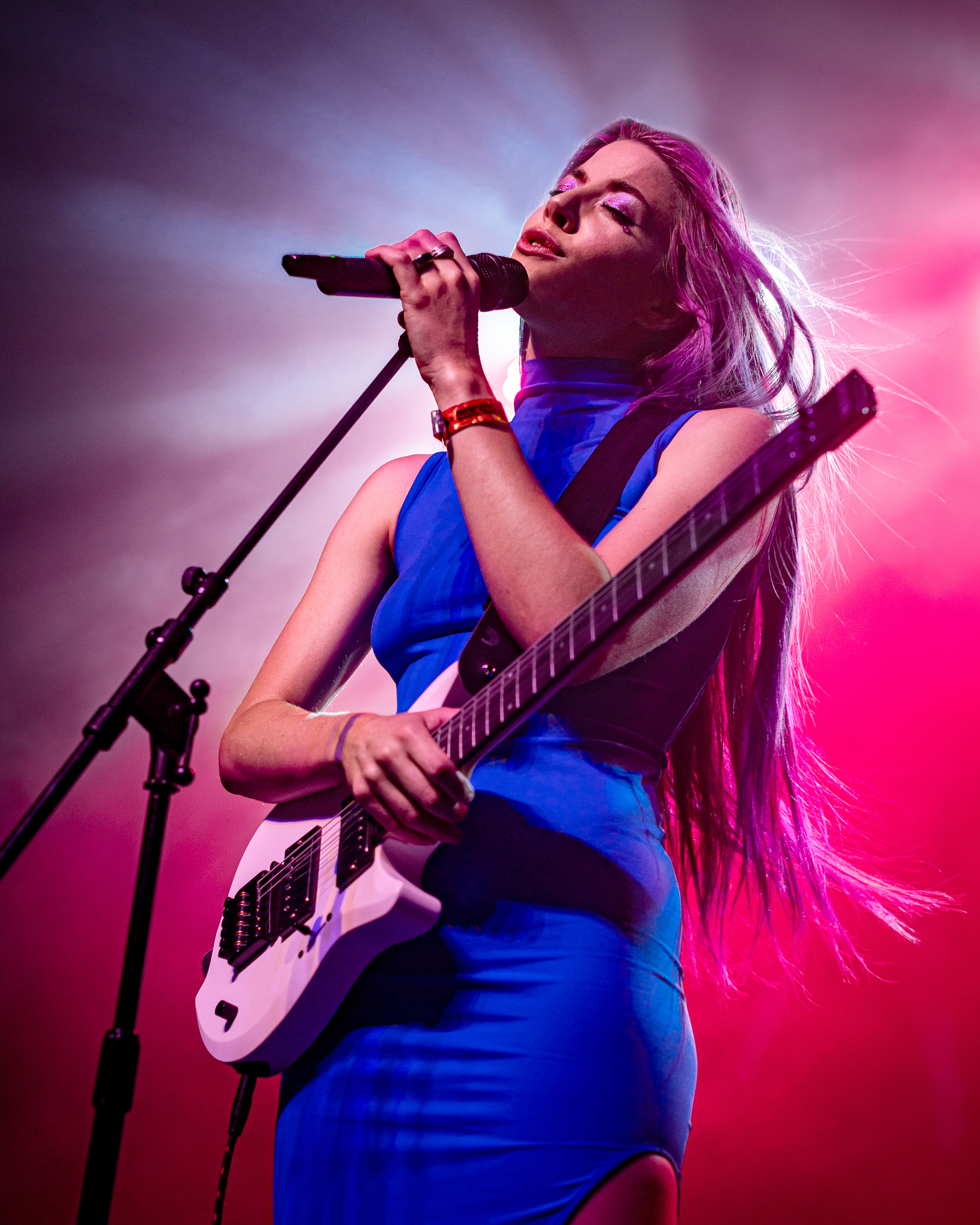
Hana in 2022

On August 14, 2019, Hana released a new single titled "Black Hole". It was her first release as lead artist since her self-titled EP in 2016. According to Hana, it is an older song that she had wanted to release for a long time.

On September 20, 2019, Hana announced that she would be live streaming the making of her upcoming second album via Twitch. The live streams took place over the course of the following four weeks. The album, Hanadriel, was released on November 6, 2019.

Between October 2019 and April 2020, Hana released several tracks with other artists. In October 2019, she and Anamanaguchi released the collaboration "On My Own", and she featured on the track "Nothing Like You" by Gryffin and Droeloe. In December 2019, she appeared alongside producer Durante on the track "Days Pass", which was released as part of the compilation Anjunadeep 11. She featured on the single "Ghosts" by Tchami in February 2020. Hana and Durante collaborated again in 2020 on the tracks "13 Voices" and "Starglow", which appeared on the compilation The Anjunadeep Edition 300, released in April. The following May, Hana and Durante's three collaborative tracks were released together on an extended play titled 13 Voices EP. The EP also features extended versions of each track.

On October 30, 2020, Hana released a new single titled "So & So". The single later appeared on the self-released EP Moonstoned. On June 30, 2025, she released the single "Illusory" which later appeared on the ExtendedPray EP with record label Anjunadeep, released on August 18, 2025. On August 11, 2025, she released a DJ Mix of Anjunadeep artists' songs, as a part of the 25 Years of Anjuna series for the record labels twenty-fifth anniversary.

== Personal life ==
Hana dated guitarist Ben Moody. She has dated American musician and producer BloodPop since May 2013. They met in a recording session. They became engaged in May 2023.

== Discography ==
=== Studio albums ===
Title
Details
Notes
This Way
(Credited as Hana Pestle)
- Released: September 22, 2009
- Label: FNR Records
- Formats: CD, digital download

Track listing
No.	Title	Length
1.	"Never Learned To Lie"	3:19
2.	"The Red Death Ball"	4:43
3.	"Need"	3:54
4.	"Rain"	4:08
5.	"This Way"	3:50
6.	"Not Worth Today"	3:36
7.	"Shadows"	4:21
8.	"Let Me Be"	6:15
9.	"Starting To Like This"	3:29
10.	"Lilly Of The Lake"	4:35
11.	"Make You Hurt"	3:37
12.	"What Makes Things"	5:12
13.	"Everybody's Alone (Bonus)"	5:05
Total length:		56:04

Hanadriel
- Released: November 6, 2019
- Label: Self-released
- Formats: Digital download, streaming

Track listing
No.	Title	Length
1.	"Satellite"	5:43
2.	"Arcane Magic"	3:37
3.	"Anxious Alien"	3:43
4.	"Creatura"	3:56
5.	"Black Orchid"	4:26
6.	"Orca"	3:29
7.	"Guardian"	3:48
8.	"Moonwell"	4:35
9.	"Nu Leaf"	2:51
10.	"Hanadriel's Theme"	4:58
11.	"Cowgirl Bebop"	5:30
12.	"Chimera 2.0"	5:17
Total length:		51:53

=== Extended plays ===
Title	Details	Notes
Hana Pestle (Credited as Hana Pestle)	Released: May 27, 2008; Label: Self-released; Formats: CD, digital download	Track listing: No. / Title / Length; 1. / "These Two Hands" / 3:41; 2. / "Just a Phase" / 4:09; 3. / "Hallelujah" / 6:20; 4. / "Together Forever" / 3:38; Total length: / / 17:48
Live in the Studio (Credited as Hana Pestle)	Released: June 2, 2009; Label: FNR Records; Formats: CD, digital download	Track listing: No. / Title / Length; 1. / "These Two Hands" / 3:01; 2. / "Just a Phase" / 4:16; 3. / "Rain" / 4:11; 4. / "Make You Hurt" / 3:08; 5. / "This Way" / 3:38; 6. / "Creep" / 4:06; 7. / "What Makes Things" / 3:31; Total length: / / 25:51
For the Sky (Credited as Hana Pestle)	Released: September 27, 2011; Label: Self-released; Formats: CD, digital download	Track listing: No. / Title / Length; 1. / "Without You" / 3:19; 2. / "Pinch Me" / 3:28; 3. / "Trying to Get Used to You" / 3:41; 4. / "Fight for Me" / 3:31; 5. / "For the Sky" / 3:19; Total length: / / 17:18
Hana	Released: March 25, 2016; Label: Self-released; Formats: digital download, 12" Limited Edition, Numbered, Red and White, Signed, Produced by: Hana and Michael Diamond	Track listing: No. / Title / Length; 1. / "Clay" / 5:04; 2. / "Avalanche" / 3:51; 3. / "Underwater" / 4:18; 4. / "White" / 3:36; 5. / "Chimera" / 5:57; Total length: / / 22:46
13 Voices EP (with Durante)	Released: May 5, 2020; Label: Anjunadeep; Formats: Digital download	Track listing: No. / Title / Length; 1. / "13 Voices" / 4:47; 2. / "Days Pass" / 3:42; 3. / "Starglow" / 4:43; 4. / "13 Voices" (extended mix) / 6:59; 5. / "Days Pass" (extended mix) / 7:00; 6. / "Starglow" (extended mix) / 6:47; Total length: / / 33:58
Moonstoned	Released: April 29, 2022; Label: Self-released; Formats: Digital download	Track listing: No. / Title / Length; 1. / "Black Hole" / 3:43; 2. / "So & So" / 4:46; 3. / "Spiritstalker" / 4:03; Total length: / / 12:32
ExtendedPray	Released: July 18, 2025; Label: Anjunadeep; Formats: Digital download, limited edition cassette	Track listing: No. / Title / Length; 1. / "Illusory" / 4:10; 2. / "Solidground" / 3:59; 3. / "Cahethel" / 3:59; 4. / "Illusory - Extended Mix" / 5:59; 5. / "Solidground - Extended Mix" / 6:51; 6. / "Cahethel - Extended Mix" / 6:16; Total length: / / 29:54

=== Singles ===
==== As lead artist ====
Title	Year	Album
"These Two Hands" (Credited as Hana Pestle)	2008	Hana Pestle - EP
"Need" (Credited as Hana Pestle)	2009	This Way
"Clay"	2015	Hana
"Avalanche"	2015	Hana
"Underwater"	2016	Hana
"Black Hole"	2019	Moonstoned
"On My Own" (with Anamanaguchi)	2019	USA
"Anxious Alien"	2020	Hanadriel
"So & So"	2020	Moonstoned
"Illusory"	2025	ExtendedPray

==== As featured artist ====
Title	Year	Album
"We Appreciate Power" (Grimes featuring Hana)	2018	Miss Anthropocene
"Ghosts" (Tchami featuring Hana)	2020	Year Zero

=== Guest appearances ===
List of non-single guest appearances, showing year released, other artist(s) featured, and album name
Title	Year	Other artist(s)	Album
"Everything Burns" (2008) (Credited as Hana Pestle)	2008	Ben Moody	Mutiny Bootleg EP
"Dark Come Soon" (Credited with Grimes as Trashique)	2017	Grimes	Tegan and Sara Present The Con X: Covers
"Nothing Like You"	2019	Gryffin, Droeloe	Gravity
"Days Pass"	2020	Durante	Anjunadeep 11
"13 Voices"	2020	Durante	The Anjunadeep Edition 300
"Starglow"	2020	Durante	The Anjunadeep Edition 300

=== Remixes ===
Title	Year	Original artist(s)
"Romeo"	2016	Chairlift
"California"	2016	Grimes
"We Appreciate Power" (Nightcore Remix)	2018	Grimes (featuring Hana)

=== Special releases ===
Title	Year	Notes
"Have Yourself a Merry Little Christmas" (Credited as Hana Pestle)	2009	Released as a free download on Hana's official online store for Christmas 2009.
"Underwater" (demo)	2017	Released as a free download on Hana's official website upon signing up to her mailing list.

=== Music videos ===
==== As lead artist ====
Title	Year	Director
"These Two Hands" (Credited as Hana Pestle)	2008	Travis Schneider
"Need" (Credited as Hana Pestle)	2009	Norwood Cheek
"Clay" (tour video)	2015	—N/a
"Clay"	2016	Lorraine Nicholson
"Underwater" (tour video)	2016	—N/a
"Underwater"	2016	Grimes
"Chimera"	2016	Grimes
"Avalanche"	2016	Grimes
"Black Hole"	2019	Hana Pestle
"Anxious Alien"	2020	Logan Fields
"So & So"	2020	Stephen Rutterford

==== As featured artist ====
Title	Year	Other artist	Directors
"Everything Burns" (Cirque Des Damnes Live) [Credited as Hana Pestle]	2012	We Are The Fallen	Dan Certa
"We Appreciate Power" (lyric video)	2018	Grimes	Grimes, Mac Boucher

==== Guest appearances ====
Title	Year	Artist(s)	Director
"Go"	2014	Grimes (featuring Blood Diamonds)	Grimes, Mac Boucher
"California"	2016	Grimes	Grimes, Mac Boucher
"Butterfly"	2016	Grimes	Grimes
"World Princess Part II"	2016	Grimes	Grimes
"Scream"	2016	Grimes (featuring Aristophanes)	Grimes
"Violence"	2019	Grimes and i_o	Grimes
"Idoru"	2020	Grimes	Grimes

=== Other contributions as Hana Pestle ===
Title	Year	Artist	Album	Contribution
"This Time"	2007	Celine Dion	Taking Chances	Backing vocals
"Perfect"	2009	Ben Moody	All for This	Backing vocals
"The Way We Are"	2009	Ben Moody	All for This	Backing vocals
"Hold Me Down"	2009	Ben Moody	All for This	Backing vocals
"10.22"	2009	Ben Moody	All for This	Backing vocals
"Never Turn Back"	2009	Ben Moody	All for This	Backing vocals
"All for This"	2009	Ben Moody	All for This	Backing vocals
"Wishing Well"	2009	Ben Moody	All for This	Backing vocals
"All Fall Down"	2009	Ben Moody	All for This	Backing vocals
"Too Far Left to Go"	2009	Ben Moody	All for This	Backing vocals
"Nothing Left of Me"	2009	Ben Moody	All for This	Backing vocals
"In Time"	2009	Ben Moody	All for This	Backing vocals
"Just Like Everybody"	2009	Ben Moody	All for This	Backing vocals
"Everything Burns"	2012	We Are The Fallen	Cirque Des Damnes Live	Leading vocals
