= Want You Back (Haim song) =

Single by Haim

from the album Something to Tell You
- Released: May 3, 2017
- Genre: Pop rock; country rock
- Length: 3:52 (album version); 3:35 (radio version)
- Label: Polydor
- Songwriters: Danielle Haim; Este Haim; Alana Haim; Ariel Rechtshaid
- Producer: Ariel Rechtshaid

Haim singles chronology
"Pray to God" (2015)	"Want You Back" (2017)	"Little of Your Love" (2017)

"Want You Back" is a song by American band Haim from their second studio album, Something to Tell You (2017). It was released on May 3, 2017, as the album's lead single. The song was written by Haim with its producer Ariel Rechtshaid.

== Background ==
"Want You Back" originally began as a much slower song, with Este Haim describing the first iteration as "More like a chill acoustic guitar kind of thing." It remained this way for a long period of time until the band brought it to one of their default producers upon feeling that "Something is not working with this song", ultimately suggesting that they adjust the tempo of the song to be 30 beats per minute faster than it was first written. Alana explained that increasing the tempo made the group's harmonies more difficult yet helped identify it as a Haim song.

== Composition and lyrics ==
"Want You Back" was co-produced by Ariel Rechtshaid, whom Danielle Haim had been dating at the time. "Want You Back" is a pop rock song with influences of 1970s music. Danielle provides lead vocals on the track, "asking for forgiveness from an ex she steamrollered into leaving." According to Pitchfork's Laura Snapes, the singer admits to having been selfish in the past, revealing a willingness to welcome love back into her life that "reverberates" throughout the song's verses. Described as battle between head and heart, Danielle's vocals are eventually joined by those of her sisters, who support her decision once she "stops explaining herself" and ultimately "pleads her case from the rooftops". Spencer Kornhaber of The Atlantic described the song's chorus as one "full of yearning and pitter-patter" that demonstrates the girls' signature tendency to perform interlocking syllables and "rapid-fire phrases", along with a phrase that repeats itself and modulates to the point of which "it seems as familiar as a folk standard".

Lyrically, "Want You Back" is about lost love, in which the band reflects upon a former relationship that they took for granted. However, Kornhaber observed that its title could refer to Haim fans who have been craving the band's return during the four years since the release of their debut album, boasting a sound that is both similar to and different from their previous work. Danielle sings the song's first bars accompanied by piano and acoustic guitar, before she is joined by Este and Alana who sing, "said it from the beginning / said you’d always see it through", accompanying Danielle's lines "I said we were opposite lovers, you kept trying to prove me wrong. And I know that I ran you down, so you ran away with your heart". A pre-chorus follows, which Kornhaber identified as "a less intense rendition of the chorus"; Danielle's line "I'll take the fall and the fault in us" reinforces its parent album's theme "that relationships are hard", according to The Guardian critic Kitty Empire. Eventually, Rechtshaid contributes additional instruments such as synthesizer, which also contribute to the song's melody and context, and bubblegum keys to the track as the ballad continues to build, arranging the harmonies in a manner that indicates "a futuristic or whimsical mood". Other instrumentation includes "power ballad–worthy piano chords" and "pitch-shifted vocal riffs"; the song also features some animal sound effects, which music journalists have identified a horse's neigh and seagull cries. The producer's instruments continue playing after the band members have finished singing, including a chorus of high-pitched voices.

The song has drawn comparisons to other artists and musicians, particularly bands and music groups who preceded Haim. Snapes observed that the single resembles the works of Don Henley and Christine McVie of The Eagles and Fleetwood Mac, respectively, until "the chorus swells and shudders like Lindsey Buckingham at his most overheated, sprinkled with jittery digital chatter." Snapes also compared "Want You Back" to The Jackson 5's similarly titled 1969 single "I Want You Back", except that "there’s a tentativeness to [Danielle's] words." Meanwhile, Kornhaber described "Want You Back" as a retro combination of 1980s and 1990s pop music that resembles the work of Fleetwood Mac, Prince and, albeit to a lesser extent, Def Leppard.

== Critical reception ==
Shortly after its release, "Want You Back" garnered the "Best New Track" title from Pitchfork. Variety's Chris Willman described Danielle's voice as "about as lovely as Sara Bareilles’, albeit a Bareilles who has spent a lot more time absorbing the rhythms of modern-day R&B hits and isn't afraid of inorganic instrumental beds." Ben Dandridge-Lemco of The Fader called the track a "pounding pop-rock tune about taking love for granted". NPR Music's Lars Gotrich says Haim does "illuminate, in a mosaic arrangement, the awestruck motions of love". Gotrich also notes the Lindsey Buckingham influences with "a touch of Michael Jackson's Bad-era handclap ballads". Daniel Kreps of Rolling Stone says the song "leans heavily on Haim's Tom Petty and Fleetwood Mac influences". In a less positive review, Spencer Kornhaber of The Atlantic found "Want You Back" to be overproduced and was critical of Rechtshaid's production, which the critic felt contradicted with "what the band is doing" and called his manipulation of vocal harmonies "the most over-used gimmick of recent pop music." However, Kornhaber concluded that the track's chorus and "sense of gathering momentum should deliver the familiar thrill fans were looking for, regardless of the studio gunk."

Pitchfork ranked "Want You Back" the 72nd greatest song of 2017, with contributor Olivia Horn writing that Danielle's vocals "achieve a rhythmic flow that simultaneously flexes her strengths as a lyricist, vocalist, and percussionist. That dexterity, paired with a healthy dose of idiosyncrasy, had us singing the chorus right back at Haim."

== Music video ==
The one-shot music video for "Want You Back" was directed by Jake Schreier and filmed at dawn in Sherman Oaks, Los Angeles, on a deserted Ventura Boulevard between Beverly Glen and Van Nuys boulevards. It premiered on June 22, 2017. The video opens with Danielle staring into the distance while standing on the corner of Ventura Boulevard and Beverly Glen, in front of Casa de Cadillac. She is soon joined by Este and Alana. The trio walks down Ventura Boulevard, performing minimal choreography along the way. The video ends with the band performing synchronized dance moves.

Initially the video was going to feature the group members performing car stunts while driving down the Boulevard, however when testing the stunts one of the cars ended up getting into a wreck, which resulted in the group deciding on making a "safer" video. Chris Willman of Variety praised the video as "the best filmic paean to the Valley since" the film Magnolia (1999). Comparing the music video to the work of director Martin Scorsese and the film Foxes, Willman concluded "If anyone can bring sexy back to Sherman Oaks, it’s Haim." Aaliyah Weathers of Paste wrote that the video proves that Haim's members "are among the coolest ladies in the industry".

== Live performances ==
Haim performed "Want You Back" live on television for the first time on Saturday Night Live on May 13, 2017.

== Charts ==
=== Weekly charts ===
Chart (2017)	Peak position
Australia (ARIA)	54
Belgium (Ultratip Bubbling Under Flanders)	2
France (SNEP)	164
Hungary (Rádiós Top 40)	34
Ireland (IRMA)	88
Japan Hot Overseas (Billboard)	17
Japan Radio Songs (Billboard)	15
New Zealand Heatseekers (RMNZ)	4
Scottish Singles Sales (Official Charts)	23
Switzerland Airplay (Schweizer Hitparade)	94
UK Singles (Official Charts)	56
US Adult Alternative Airplay (Billboard)	27
US Hot Rock & Alternative Songs (Billboard)	10
US Rock & Alternative Airplay (Billboard)	48

=== Year-end charts ===
Chart (2017)	Position
US Hot Rock Songs (Billboard)	76

== Certifications ==
Region	Certification	Certified units/sales
United Kingdom (BPI)	Silver	200,000^{‡}
^{‡} Sales+streaming figures based on certification alone.
