= Yung Jake =

American artist

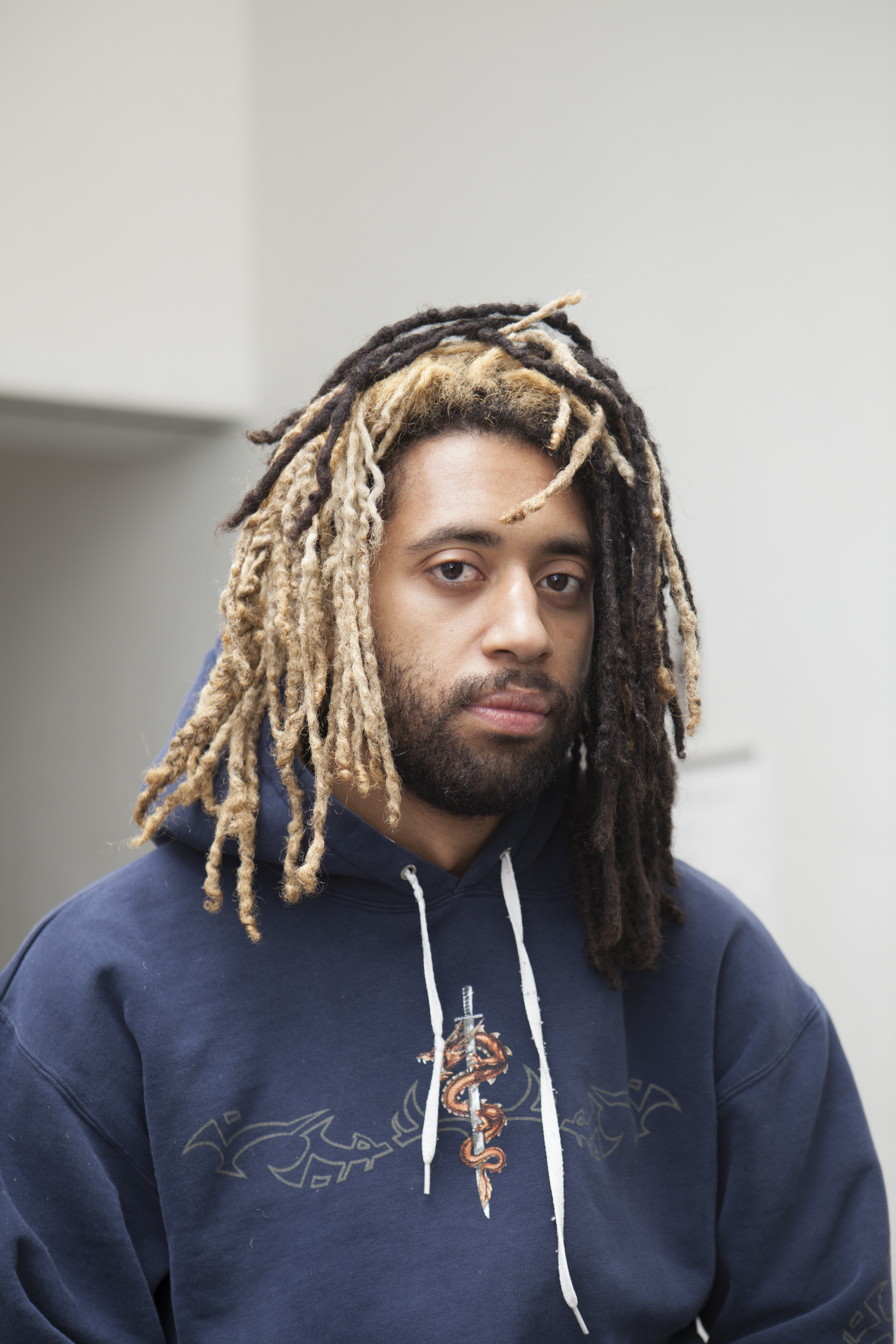
- Education: California Institute of the Arts, Los Angeles, California
- Known for: Painting, sculpture, digital and internet art, video, music
- Notable work: "Datamosh" (2011) "e.m-bed.de/d/" (2012)
- Movement: Internet Art, New media art, Trap music

Jake Patterson, professionally known as Yung Jake, is an American artist and rapper. His work often explores new mediums and technologies, and spans across painting, sculpture, digital and internet art, video, music, apps, and products. His first well known work was "Datamosh" (2011), which was shown at the Digital Salon of the Sundance Film Festival in 2013, and his most well known works are emoji portraits of celebrities. He has directed music videos, including "H.G.T.V." for Pusha T, and worked on television shows for Adult Swim. He frequently collaborates with artist and programmer Vince McKelvie.

== Early life and education ==
Yung Jake grew up in various locations including Bridgehampton and Sag Harbor in the United States as well as Bali and New Zealand. He attended Bridgehampton High School and graduated from California Institute of the Arts in 2012.

== Career ==
Yung Jake is most well known for his emoji portraits, often of celebrities such as Justin Bieber, Leonardo DiCaprio, Willow Smith, and Kim Kardashian. The portraits exist both as digital and physical works, and they have been shown, and sold, at various art fairs including Art Basel and Zona Maco. In 2015 Yung Jake and Vince McKelvie created Emoji.ink, a free online tool that allows anyone to create their own emoji portraits.

He is represented by the Steve Turner gallery in Los Angeles, and the Tripoli Patterson gallery in Wainscott, New York. His 2018 series of paintings titled "Hydration" were described as "glossy UV prints of almost comically amorphous water bottles on steel panels and furniture, adorned with brand logos, nostalgic cartoon characters, and raw elements of angsty tagging via stickers, spray paint, and etchings". Of his art practice he said “I just try to have fun with everything. If I don’t enjoy doing it I don’t wanna do it” and "I think I do mad different things for my sanity. I can’t be stuck in a box just 'cause society makes it easy to do that."

Yung Jake is known for conducting interviews via text message, which has been noted as an unconventional practice.

As a rapper he has performed at Los Angeles' Museum of Contemporary Art, the Sundance Institute's New Frontiers program, and South by Southwest. His song "Unfollow" (2014) was described as "somewhere between after-school special and sunshine acid fever-dream", and his rapping style has been compared to Lil' B.
