= Patrick (Bischoff) Brown =

American record producer

Patrick (Bischoff) Brown (born August 26, 1978, in Phoenix, Arizona) is an American engineer, producer and studio owner. He has been the CEO of several record labels, including Brown Bottle Records and Different Fur Studios. He is the current owner of Different Fur Studios in the Mission district of San Francisco, California.

== Biography ==
Brown spent his early life in Arizona and later moved to Long Island, New York, where he studied web design. He found out that he had a talent for recording after working on various projects with friends and helping friends' bands record. Because of this talent Brown moved to San Francisco in 1998 where, after getting settled, he attended Ex'pression College for Digital Arts. In 2004, during his final semester at Ex'pression, Brown was hired as an Intern at Different Fur. There he was given his first solo session, Gordon Gano from The Violent Femmes. 2006 marked a turning point for the studio because Brown helped bring in various bands through iTunes' Live Sessions. In 2007 Brown purchased the studio from Jeremy Smith. Most studios are not owned by engineers, but Brown purposefully wanted to create a studio that focused on this aspect of the recording process. As owner, he morphed the business model by bringing in more interns, because Brown believes it takes a community of passionately involved people to really create something worthwhile. Since Brown's purchase of the studio, he has been credited as an owner who has "modernized the studio without losing any of the building's pastoral charm".

Brown's work has been featured on Pitchfork, Stereogum, Urb, Fader, PrefixMag, Imposemagazine, Vice, Noisey, Spinner, Hybebeast, Spin.com, iTunes New & Noteworthy, iTunes Indie Spotlight, WorldStar HipHop, 2dopeboys, The Owl Mag, Live 105, "Chronicle" the movie, a Reese's Peanut Butter Cup commercial, The Bay Bridged, Impose Magazine, The Bold Italic, Playboy, and his work with The Morning Benders was voted iTunes Indie album of the year in 2008.

== Recording Technique ==
As an engineer, Brown is constantly focused on the sound and vibe in the room. He pays attention to who is coming in and out, the reactions of people, and who needs coaxing in one direction or another. He views being an engineer as an art form in and of itself because he has to look at the sound being put to tape on different levels – the musician's, the consumer's, the technical side, and the sonic side – and balance all of these levels at the same time. According to Brown, "it's sort of like a balance between the performance itself and the actual sound, you know, you're deciding which is more important or how to get both. And they're completely different things."

That being said, Brown feels he is an under-producer in that he wants to hear the emotion behind the artist and his/her songs first and foremost. "All in all, I'll do everything I can to make sure things sound the way you expect, and hopefully even better, so that when you leave you are proud of what we've accomplished."

Brown also focuses on trying to get bands to their next place. He constantly thinks about getting artists more attention for their music, which starts with the recording itself, but also includes getting fans out to their shows, telling people about the record, and finding new ways of getting records into the hands of fans.

Brown plans to keep the studio on the creative cutting-edge and in 2011 completed an upgrade accompanied by construction. He is also content to keep the studio focused on local bands and local labels, including Tricycle Records and Omega Records. However, this doesn't prevent the occasional big-name artist from stopping by. And while Brown will focus on getting out the sounds a band wants in their song, he is also going to make sure they're comfortable. Plus, if an artist does something funny, chances are he will tweet about it.

== Influences ==
Growing up, Brown was a fan of artists he first heard through his Mom, including Paul Simon, Billy Joel, and Neil Young. He also listened to a lot of late 1980s and early 1990s pop like Technotronic, Lisa Lisa, MC Hammer, and a lot of Bobby Brown. In fact, Bobby Brown's Don't Be Cruel, which was recorded at Different Fur Studios, is an influential album for Patrick Brown.

Brown is a fan of few engineers, but is evaluating other people's works and learning from them. Brown finds engineers Russell Elevado, Tony Maserati, and Tom Dowd influential. However, he draws more inspiration from producers and musicians like Morris Day, Prince, D'angelo, Biggie, Funkadelic's album Maggot Brain, the first N.E.R.D. record, and the first Kenna record. Brown is influenced by them and records that have challenged what has been established, which helps him grow the most as an engineer, producer, and studio owner.

== Discography ==
=== Albums ===
2006

- Karpov – Soliloquy
- Transdub Massiv – Negril To Kingston City
- FM Fatale – Soft Life for Killers
- Vienna Teng – Dreaming Through The Noise

2007

- The Most Holy Trinity – Rituals for Parting
- Chow Nasty – Super Electrical Recordings
- Gravy Train!!!! – All The Sweet Stuff

2008

- Michael Franti & Spearhead – All Rebel Rockers
- The Morning Benders – Talking Through Tin Cans
- Alison Harris – Smoke rings in the sky
- Morley – Seen
- Big Light – Big Light

2009

- Trainwreck Riders – The Perch
- So Many Wizards – Tree

2010

- Flexx Bronco – Volume 2: Off the Record
- The Morning Benders – Big Echo
- Gomorran Social Aid Club – The Gomorran Social Aid and Pleasure Club

2010 (continued)

- The Gomorrans – Giving Birth To Love
- Victor Harris – Midnight at Malibu
- A B & The Sea – Christmas (Baby Please Come Home)

2011

- NeaCombo Diffuzion – Round 2 Digital Attack (Mastering)
- Lowered (Mastering)
- Alessandra – So Nice
- Dylan Fox And The Wave – Tunnel Vision
- A B & The Sea – Run Run Run
- The Park – The Process...
- Zodiac Death Valley – Zodiac Death Valley
- Le Panique – Saturday Matinee
- Lilac – Lilac

2012

- Sourpatch – Stagger and Fade
- A B & The Sea – Constant Vacation
- Lilac – Christine
- The Park featuring Darondo and Happy Mayfield – The Silvercloud Time Machine (7")
- Nate Mercereau – $1,000,000 Worth of Twang
- Buttercream Gang – Oh Brother
- Illusion of Self – Illusion of Self

=== EP's ===
- 2010 A B & The Sea – Boys and Girls
- 2011 The Park – These Are The Days
- 2011 The Cold Volts – People Noise
- 2011 Dylan Fox and The Wave - Tunnel Vision
- 2011 Bird Call – Other Creatures (co-engineered)
- 2011 A B & The Sea – Run Run Run!
- 2011 Ash Reiter – Heatwave
- 2011 Lilac – Lilac
- 2012 Starred – Prison to Prison

=== Live Session (iTunes exclusive) ===
- 2007 Black Lips. iTunes link
- 2007 Rodrigo y Gabriela. iTunes link
- 2007 Mew. iTunes link
- 2007 Jack Ingram. iTunes link
- 2007 Gomez. iTunes link
- 2008 OneRepublic. iTunes link
- 2008 Tristan Prettyman. iTunes link
- 2008 The Blakes. iTunes link
- 2008 Tegan and Sara. iTunes link
- 2008 Amos Lee. iTunes link.

=== Singles ===
- 2006 Hey Willpower – "P.D.A. (US Bonus Track)"
- 2009 Skin & Bones, featuring Chris Chu, Bernie Worrell and 88 keys – "Lemonade" (Executive Producer/Engineer)
- 2009 A B & The Sea – "Suzie/Yellow-Haired Girl"
- 2011 Skin & Bones, featuring Izza Kizza and Bernie Worrell – "Holdn’ Back"
- 2011 The Park – "Belleville"
- 2011 Skin & Bones – "Stomp / Pop Painkillaz (remix)"
- 2012 Midi Matilda – "Love & The Movies"
- 2012 Grillade – "I'd Love to Change the World"
- 2012 Surf Club – "Reverie"
- 2012 Swiftumz – "Willy"
- 2012 Dirty Ghosts – "Eyes of a Stranger"
- 2012 Woof – "Get it Right"
- 2012 Woof – "Grimer" feat. Antwon & Swiftumz
- 2012 Woof – "Black Roses" feat. G-Side, Tragik & Doe Eye
- 2012 Woof – "Woolybrain"

=== Videos ===
2008

- The Morning Benders – Waiting for a War
- The Morning Benders – Boarded Doors

2009

- Skin&Bones – Mistah Fab
- Flexx Bronco – Pop

2010

- Toro y Moi – You Hid
- "Don't Walk Away". Underwire. Wired. Archived from the original on September 25, 2010.
- Chromeo – J'ai Claque La Porte
- The Morning Benders – Resse's Commercial
- The Morning Benders – All Day All Night
- The Morning Benders – Promises

2011

- Ash Reiter – Heatwave
- Bird Call – Other Creatures EP (behind the scenes)
- Sourpatch – Cynthia Ann
- Grimes – Vanessa and Oblivion
- Lilac – So Young
- Sun Airway – Oh Naoko
- Lower Dens – Batman
- Yuck – Policeman
- UMO – How Can You Luv Me
- Bobby – Groggy
- Zola Jesus- Vesse
- Araabmuzik – In My Room
- The Park – These are the Days

2011 (continued)

- The Park – Belleville
- The Park – Belle
- Pat Parra – Forget Your Love
- Twin Sister – Stop
- Lia Ices – Ice Wine
- Zodiac Death Valley – The Room

2012

- Lilac – Shame
- Dam Funk & Master Blaster – Songs from Scratch
- B. Bravo and The Starship Connection – The Roll Out
- Blind Pilot – Half Moon
- Of Montreal – dour percentage
- The Walkmen – The Love You Love
- Lee Fields and the Expressions – Faithful Man
- Gary Clark Jr – Bright Lights and When My Train Pulls In
- Alabama Shakes – Boys and Girls and I Ain't The Same
- Charli XCX – You're the One and Stay Away
- Nicolas Jaar – Variations and Why Didn't You Save Me
- Bear in Heaven – Warm Water and World of Freakout
- Kendrick Lamar and ScHoolboy Q – Hol' Up and A.D.H.D. w/ Hands on the Wheel
- The Park – Jesse James w/ Darondo
- American Hipster Presents – Episode #4 w/ YT and the Walkmen
- American Hipster Presents – Paavo Explores the Studio (behind the scenes)
- A B & the Sea – Short Straight Bangs teaser
- A B & the Sea – Taking It All Away teaser
- A B & the Sea – California Feeling teaser
- Midi Matilda – Love & The Movies
- Nick Waterhouse – Some Place Archived 2012-08-08 at the Wayback Machine
