= 2009 in music =

This topic covers notable events and articles related to 2009 in music.

== Specific locations ==
- 2009 in American music
- 2009 in Australian music
- 2009 in British music
- 2009 in Canadian music
- 2009 in European music (Continental Europe)
- 2009 in Irish music
- 2009 in Japanese music
- 2009 in New Zealand music
- 2009 in Norwegian music
- 2009 in Scandinavian music
- 2009 in South Korean music

== Specific genres ==
- 2009 in rock music
- 2009 in classical music
- 2009 in country music
- 2009 in electro pop music
- 2009 in heavy metal music
- 2009 in hip-hop
- 2009 in jazz
- 2009 in Latin music
- 2009 in opera
- 2009 in progressive rock

== Events ==
=== January ===
- January 8 – Lady Gaga's debut single "Just Dance" hit number one on the Billboard Hot 100 after 22 weeks – the second longest climb to number one since November 2000 (27 weeks).
- January 16 – February 1 – The Big Day Out festival takes place in Australia and New Zealand, headlined by Neil Young, The Shiny Brights, The Prodigy and Arctic Monkeys. The Vines, who are originally on the lineup, cancel all appearances due to concerns around frontman Craig Nicholls' mental health.
- January 17 – Koncerthuset, a new concert hall, is officially opened in Copenhagen, by Queen Margrethe II of Denmark.
- January 18 – As part of the inaugural celebration of US President Barack Obama, an inaugural concert entitled "We Are One" is held at the Lincoln Memorial. Performers include Mary J. Blige, Garth Brooks, Renée Fleming, Caleb Green, Josh Groban, Herbie Hancock, Heather Headley, Beyoncé, Bettye LaVette, Pete Seeger, Shakira, Bruce Springsteen, James Taylor, U2 and Stevie Wonder. Several of the songs performed had been used by Obama's presidential campaign.
- January 20 – Artists including Mariah Carey, Jay-Z, Alicia Keys, Shakira, Sting, Faith Hill, Mary J. Blige, Maroon 5, Stevie Wonder and Will.i.am perform at the inaugural ball for President Barack Obama

=== February ===
- February 8
  - At the 51st Grammy Awards which took place at the Staples Center, Los Angeles:
  - Alison Krauss and Robert Plant win five Grammys for their duet album Raising Sand which also won Album of the Year
  - Lil Wayne wins four awards, including Best Rap Album for Tha Carter III.
  - Coldplay win three awards including Song of the Year for Viva La Vida.
  - Adele wins two awards including Best New Artist.
  - Blink-182 announce that they are to reunite for a tour and new album.
- February 10 – Rihanna cancels her Malaysian concert in the Good Girl Gone Bad Tour amid reports that she accused her boyfriend R&B star Chris Brown of assault. Organizers had announced that she would shun skimpy outfits to conform with Muslim-majority Malaysia's strict rule on performers' dress.
- February 18
  - Pet Shop Boys win the outstanding contribution to music award at the Brit Awards, held in Earl's Court, London. Duffy dominates the awards. Her album, Rockferry, the U.K. top seller in 2008, wins best British album, and she also wins best British female and British breakthrough
  - Kings of Leon (best international group) win best international album for Only by the Night.
  - Katy Perry wins best international female trophy.

=== March ===
- March 2 – Elton John and Billy Joel's tour dates are mostly configured for 360-degree view in order to maximize arena capacity. The duo's previous tour, in 2003, grossed US$45.8 million from only 24 sellouts according to Billboard Boxscore.
- March 22
  - Fleetwood Mac embark on their first world tour in five years, with a possible new studio album to follow.
  - Lady Gaga's single "Poker Face" gives her a second number 1 on the UK Singles Chart, remaining there for a further two weeks. It goes on to become the biggest-selling single of 2009 and the biggest-selling digital single ever in the UK.
- March 27 – Rapper T.I. is sentenced to a one-year and one day prison sentence on federal weapons charges.

=== April ===
- April 4
  - Ringo Starr and Paul McCartney perform together (for the first time since 2002) at the Radio City Music Hall for the David Lynch Foundation.
  - The 2009 Rock and Roll Hall of Fame induction ceremony takes place, welcoming new inductees Little Anthony & The Imperials, Bobby Womack, Jeff Beck as a solo artist, Run-D.M.C., and Metallica. Metallica, citing the drama surrounding Blondie and Van Halen's inductions, includes Cliff Burton and Jason Newsted, both former bassists for the band, in the induction. Newsted also performs with band in its first rendition as a 5-piece band featuring two bass guitarists.
- April 11 – Susan Boyle's version of the song "I Dreamed a Dream" from the musical Les Misérables on Britain's Got Talent becomes a worldwide sensation, as it is seen over 200 million times on YouTube and other video outlets.
- April 13 – Music producer Phil Spector is found guilty of the 2003 murder of actress Lana Clarkson; Spector, who was acclaimed for his Wall of Sound production techniques, was sentenced to 19 years imprisonment the following month.
- April 26 – UK grime rapper Tinchy Stryder's collaboration with N-Dubz, "Number 1", goes to the No.1 spot, shifting 72,000 copies in its first week. Stryder's single was the only ever song entitled "Number One" to reach the No.1 spot – even though there have been 23 other songs with the same name.

=== May ===
- May 3 – A concert at Madison Square Garden to celebrate the 90th birthday of Pete Seeger features Bruce Springsteen, Joan Baez, Roger McGuinn, Dave Matthews and Eddie Vedder among others
- May 5 – Tina Turner concludes her 50th anniversary tour at Sheffield Arena in the United Kingdom. It is her final performance before her retirement from live touring later in the year.
- May 16 – Alexander Rybak wins the Eurovision Song Contest 2009 with his song "Fairytale" in Moscow, giving Norway its third victory. Within a couple of days, the song reaches the top ten in charts in most of Europe, including a No. 10 entry in the UK Singles Chart
- May 20 – Kris Allen defeats Adam Lambert to win the eighth season of American Idol.

=== June ===
- June 4-7
  - Wakarusa 2009.
  - Oasis begin the summer stadium leg of their world tour with 3 sold-out homecoming concerts at the 70,000 capacity Heaton Park.
- June 11-14 – Bonnaroo 2009.
- June 12-14 – The annual Download Festival takes place at Donington Park in Leicestershire, UK. The main stage is headlined by Faith No More, Slipknot and Def Leppard, the second stage by Mötley Crüe, The Prodigy and Trivium, the Tuborg stage by Meshuggah, Anvil and Go:Audio, and the Red Bull Bedroom Jam stage by Blackhole, The Blackout and We Are the Ocean.
- June 13 – Men at Work are sued by Larrikin Records for their No. 1 1982 Billboard hit "Down Under" for the flute riff from a part of the song. It was claimed to be stolen from an Australian nursery song "Kookaburra".
- June 24-28 – Glastonbury Festival 2009
- June 25 – A fortnight before his This Is It series of concerts is scheduled to begin, Michael Jackson dies in his Los Angeles home, of an accidental overdose of propofil and benzodiazepines.
- June 30 – The U2 360° Tour begins in Barcelona's Camp Nou Stadium in front of a sell out crowd.

=== July ===
- July 2-3 – Blur's 20-year reunion and superconcert at Hyde Park.
- July 2-5 – Heineken Open'er Festival in Gdynia, Poland
- July 3 – Yahoo! Music announces that Taylor Swift's album Fearless and Flo Rida's single "Right Round" are the top-selling album and single, respectively, of the first half of the year.
- July 6–12 – Australian Radio station Triple J holds its 'Hottest 100 of All Time' with Nirvana's "Smells Like Teen Spirit" coming in first for the third consecutive time a 'Hottest 100 of All Time' has been held 1991, 1998 and 2009. This is the largest music poll in the world with more than half a million people voting.
- July 9–12 – 10th EXIT festival takes place in the Petrovaradin Fortress of Novi Sad, Serbia, with more than 190,000 visitors.
- July 21 – Shortlist announced for the 2009 Mercury Prize.
- July 22-25 – 2009 10,000 Lakes Festival
- July 25–26 – Indietracks Festival, Derbyshire, UK
  - The Splendour in the Grass music festival is held in Byron Bay, Australia, headlined by Bloc Party and The Flaming Lips.
- July 30 – Justice Peter Jacobson of the Federal Court of Australia makes a preliminary ruling that Larrikin did own copyright on the song "Down Under", but the issue of whether or not Men at Work had plagiarised the riff was set aside to be determined at a later date.

=== August ===
- August 7–9 – Lollapalooza 2009
- August 14–16 – Bloodstock Open Air Festival, Derbyshire, UK
- August 20–22 – Hip Hop Kemp in Hradec Králové, Czech Republic
- August 21–23 – The Green Festival in New Brunswick, Canada
- August 28 – After another fight with his brother Liam, Noel Gallagher leaves Oasis. Initial reports shortly afterwards suggested that Oasis had broken up, but Liam later stated that they have not broken up. The remaining members of Oasis eventually decide to discontinue the band name and start recording under a new name, Beady Eye.
- August 28 – The Black Eyed Peas Malaysian concert in celebration of beer giant Guinness's 250th anniversary in Kuala Lumpur is restricted to only non-Muslims since the sponsor is an alcoholic brand and it is considered inappropriate for Muslims to attend the concert which scheduled in September.
- August 30 – ICS Vortex & Mustis leave Dimmu Borgir, with Mustis threatening legal action.

=== September ===
- September 8 – Winner of the 2009 Mercury Prize announced.
- September 9
  - The entire catalogue of The Beatles is re-released as digital remasters with rare pictures, short documentaries, original and newly written liner notes with replicated original UK artwork for the first time since 1987.
  - "Obsessed" by Mariah Carey enters the top ten and peaks at No. 7 on Billboard's Hot 100. The track is Carey's 27th top ten hit, lifting her into a three-way tie for fifth-most top 10s since the Hot 100 launched in 1958. She also tied with Janet Jackson for second-place among women. "Obsessed" was the lead single from her 12th studio album, Memoirs of an Imperfect Angel, and went on to be certified platinum by the end of the year.
- September 12 – The first ever outdoor Sunset Strip Music Festival is held in West Hollywood, featuring performances from more than fifty bands including Ozzy Osbourne and Korn.
- September 13 – At the 2009 MTV Video Music Awards, held in New York City at Radio City Music Hall, Lady Gaga, Beyoncé and Green Day win three awards. During Taylor Swift's acceptance speech for Best Female Video, Kanye West walks on stage and interrupts her saying that Beyoncé had one of the greatest videos of all time.
- September 16 – The Spice Girls reunite for dinner and drinks in London except for Victoria (Posh Spice), who was in Los Angeles. It was the first time all four Spice Girls reunited in public since their "Return of the Spice Girls Tour" in 2007/8. This 'public reunion' sparked rumours that the girls would reform again.
- September 17
  - Avril Lavigne and husband Deryck Whibley split after three years of marriage.
  - VH1 Divas returns after a five-year absence with appearances by Kelly Clarkson, Jordin Sparks, Jennifer Hudson, Leona Lewis, Adele, and Miley Cyrus with host Paula Abdul
- September 21
  - Genesis release the fourth of 5 planned box sets, Genesis Live 1973–2007.
  - Winner of the 2009 Polaris Music Prize announced.
- September 25–27 – The inaugural Rotor Festival for Contemporary Music, an initiative of the International Music Institute (IMD) and the Ensemble Modern, is held in Frankfurt am Main, featuring music by Iannis Xenakis and Helmut Lachenmann, amongst others.

=== October ===
- October 28 – Michael Jackson's This Is It, featuring behind the scenes footage in the days before his death, is released. It enters the chart at No. 1, and becomes the best selling documentary of all time, raising over $250 million.

=== November ===
- November 11 – The Country Music Association Awards will take place in Nashville, Tennessee, United States, from Bridgestone Arena. Brad Paisley and Carrie Underwood's second year hosting.
- November 17 – Canadian pop/R&B singer Justin Bieber becomes the first artist ever to have seven songs from a debut album chart on the Billboard Hot 100 when his debut album, My World is released.
- November 22
  - The AMAs feature notable performances by Lady Gaga, Shakira, and Rihanna, but the ceremony is most remembered for the performance by Adam Lambert of his debut single "For Your Entertainment".
  - Stan Walker is crowned the winner of the seventh and final season of Australian Idol, defeating Hayley Warner.

=== December ===
- December 7 – Chris Brown makes a comeback by releasing his third studio album Graffiti months after he was charged for felony assault against female pop singer Rihanna.
- December 13 – Lady Gaga becomes the first female artist in British chart history to achieve three number 1 singles in a single year, when her song "Bad Romance" reaches the top of the UK Singles Chart.
  - Joe McElderry is named winner of the sixth series of The X Factor UK. Olly Murs is named runner-up, while Stacey Solomon and Danyl Johnson finish in third and fourth place respectively.
- December 20 – Rage Against the Machine takes the Christmas number one slot in the United Kingdom with "Killing in the Name", after a massive Facebook campaign.
- December 22 – Per Eriksson & Niklas Sandin replace The Norrmans in Katatonia.

== Bands formed ==
- See Musical groups established in 2009

== Bands reformed ==
- Bee Gees (announced live concerts)
- Blink-182 (new album and tour)
- Cold (first album and tour since their split in 2006)
- Cold Chisel
- Creed (new album and tour)
- Faith No More (touring only)
- Jairus (releasing album and touring)
- Karma To Burn (touring only)
- Matchbook Romance
- Mott the Hoople (touring only)
- Mr. Big (touring only)
- Mucky Pup (touring and new live CD & DVD releases)
- Noise Addict (new album)
- Phish (new album and tour)
- Plastic Ono Band (first album under the name since 1975)
- Public Image Ltd. (touring for 30th anniversary)
- Saint Vitus (few shows only)
- The Scene Aesthetic (new album and tour)
- Screeching Weasel
- Skunk Anansie (new single, greatest hits album and tour)
- Sunny Day Real Estate (album reissues and tour)
- Tumbleweed (appearing at Homebake festival)
- Underground Lovers (appearing at Homebake festival)
- Wang Chung (new album and tour)

== Returning performers ==
- Alcazar (first studio album since 2003)
- Alice in Chains (first studio album since 1995, and first release with William DuVall on vocals)
- The Black Eyed Peas (first new album since 2005, after false rumors of breakup)
- Blink-182 (first tour since 2004)
- Blur (first performance since 2003)
- Creed (first tour since 2004; first studio album since 2001)
- The Dead (first tour since 2004)
- D.R.I. (first studio album since 1995)
- Josh Doyle (first studio recording since 2004; first tour since 2001)
- Face to Face (first studio album since 2002)
- Green Day (first studio album since 2004)
- Guano Apes (first tour since 2004)
- KISS (first studio album since 1998)
- The Mighty Mighty Bosstones (first all-new studio album since 2002)
- The Offspring (first full-scale tour since 2005)
- Pestilence (first album since 1993)
- Polvo (first studio album since 1997, and first release with new drummer Brian Quast)
- Kelly Price (first R&B album since 2003)
- Rancid (first studio album since 2003, and first release with new drummer Branden Steineckert)
- Ratt (first album since 1999)
- Shakira (first English studio album since 2005)
- The Smashing Pumpkins (first studio album recorded without founding drummer Jimmy Chamberlin since 1998)
- Snot (first album since 1997, and first release with Tommy "Vext" Cummings on vocals)
- Third Eye Blind (first studio album since 2003)
- Thirty Seconds to Mars (first studio album since 2005)
- Titãs (first studio album since 2003)
- U2 (first studio album since 2004)

== Bands disbanded ==
- See Musical groups disestablished in 2009

== Bands on hiatus ==
- (+44)
- Bloc Party
- The Chicks
- Fall Out Boy (indefinite hiatus)
- Foo Fighters
- ¡Forward, Russia!
- Girls Aloud
- Nightmare of You
- Nine Inch Nails (Indefinite touring hiatus)
- The Pink Spiders
- P.O.D.
- The Pussycat Dolls
- Seemless
- Stereolab
- Sugarcult
- t.A.T.u.
- The Fratellis
- The Knife
- The Matches
- TV on the Radio
- Yellowcard (indefinite hiatus)

== Albums released ==
- Susan Boyle's album I Dreamed a Dream became the biggest selling album in the world for 2009, selling 8.3 million copies in five weeks of release.

== Best-selling albums globally ==
The best-selling records in 2009 in the world according to IFPI:

Position	Album title	Artist
1	I Dreamed a Dream	Susan Boyle
2	The E.N.D.	The Black Eyed Peas
3	This Is It	Michael Jackson
4	Fearless	Taylor Swift
5	The Fame	Lady Gaga
6	Crazy Love	Michael Bublé
7	No Line on the Horizon	U2
8	Thriller	Michael Jackson
9	Number Ones	Michael Jackson
10	My Christmas	Andrea Bocelli

== Top hits on record in the world ==
=== Canada ===
- "3" – Britney Spears (#1)
- "Circus" – Britney Spears (#2)
- "Heartless" – Kanye West (#8)
- "Hot n Cold" – Katy Perry (#1)
- "I Gotta Feeling" – The Black Eyed Peas (#1)
- "I Hate This Part" – The Pussycat Dolls (#5)
- "I'm Yours" – Jason Mraz (#3)
- "My Life Would Suck Without You" – Kelly Clarkson (#1)
- "Love Sex Magic" – Ciara featuring Justin Timberlake (#8)
- "Love Story" – Taylor Swift (#4)
- "LoveGame" – Lady Gaga (#2)
- "Paparazzi" – Lady Gaga (#3)
- "She Wolf" – Shakira (#5)
- "So What" – Pink (#1)
- "Sober" – Pink (#8)

=== United States ===
See 2009 in American music#U. S. charts

== Classical music ==
See 2009 in classical music

== Opera ==
See 2009 in classical music

== Musical films ==
- Jonas Brothers: The 3D Concert Experience premiered on February 27, 2009.
- Love Guru
- Música en espera
- Michael Jackson's This Is It premiered on October 28, 2009.
- Nodame Cantabile: The Movie I
- Notorious

== Births ==
- April 20 - Calah Lane, American actress and singer
- May 11 - Trinity Bliss, American actress, singer, and YouTuber
- October 14 - Ryder Tully, American singer-songwriter and actor
- October 17 – Freya Skye, English singer and actress, represented the United Kingdom in the Junior Eurovision Song Contest in 2022
- December 13 – Maddox Batson, American country-pop singer-songwriter

== Deaths ==
=== January–February ===
- January 2 – Valentina Giovagnini, 28, Italian singer (car crash)
- January 6 – Ron Asheton, 60, American guitarist (heart attack)
- January 8 – Lamya al Mugheiry, 35, African singer
- January 9 – Dave Dee, 67, British singer (Dave Dee, Dozy, Beaky, Mick & Tich)
- January 12 – Alejandro Sokol, 48, Argentine rock musician (cardio-respiratory failure)
- January 13 – Mansour Rahbani, 83, Lebanese composer
- January 14 – Angela Morley, 84, English conductor and composer
- January 15 – Veronica Dudarova, 92, Russian symphony conductor
- January 18 – João Aguardela, 39, Portuguese rock singer, musician and composer
- January 28 – Billy Powell, 56, American keyboardist (Lynyrd Skynyrd)
- January 29 – John Martyn, 60, British singer/songwriter
- January 31 – Dewey Martin, 68, Canadian drummer (Buffalo Springfield)
- February 1 – Lukas Foss, 86, American pianist, conductor and composer
- February 2 – Sunny Skylar, 95, American songwriter
- February 3
  - Tom Brumley, 73, American steel guitarist (The Buckaroos)
  - Kurt Demmler, 65, German songwriter
- February 4 – Lux Interior, 62, American singer (The Cramps)
- February 7
  - Blossom Dearie, 82, American jazz singer and pianist
  - Jorge Reyes, 56, Mexican musician (Chac Mool)
- February 9 – Vic Lewis, 89, British jazz guitarist
- February 11 – Estelle Bennett, 67, American singer (The Ronettes)
- February 12
  - Mat Mathews, 84, Dutch jazz accordionist
  - Coleman Mellett, 34, American guitarist
  - Gerry Niewood, 65, American jazz saxophonist
- February 14
  - Louie Bellson, 84, American jazz drummer
  - John McGlinn, 55, American conductor and historian of musicals
- February 15 – Joe Cuba, 78, Puerto Rican jazz percussionist
- February 18 – Snooks Eaglin, 72, American guitarist and singer
- February 19
  - Kelly Groucutt, 63, British bass guitar player (Electric Light Orchestra)
  - Harrison Ridley Jr., 70, American jazz presenter
  - Miika Tenkula, 34, Finnish guitar player (Sentenced)
- February 20 – Fats Sadi, 81, Belgian jazz musician, vocalist and composer
- February 24
  - Svatopluk Havelka, 83, Czech composer
  - Pearl Lang, 87, American dancer and choreographer
- February 25 – Randall Bewley, 53, American guitarist (Pylon)

=== March–April ===
- March 1 – Joan Turner, 86, British singer and actress
- March 2 – Ernie Ashworth, 80, American country singer
- March 3 – Sydney Earle Chaplin, 82, American actor and singer
- March 4 – John Cephas, 78, American Piedmont blues guitarist
- March 5 – Edmund Hockridge, 79, Canadian singer and actor
- March 6
  - Francis Magalona, 44, Filipino actor and rapper
  - Henri Pousseur, 79, Belgian composer
- March 7 – Jimmy Boyd, 70, American singer
- March 14 – Alain Bashung, 61, French singer/songwriter and actor
- March 18 – Kent Henry, 60, American blues/rock guitarist
- March 22 – Reg Isidore, 59, Aruban drummer (Robin Trower Band)
- March 24 – Uriel Jones, 74, Motown Funk Brothers session drummer
- March 25 – "England" Dan Seals, 61, American singer-songwriter (mantle cell lymphoma)
- March 29 – Maurice Jarre, 84, French composer
- April 9 – Randy Cain, 63, singer, (The Delfonics)

=== May–June ===
- May 6 – Ean Evans, 48, American bass guitarist
- May 13 – Rafael Escalona, 81, Colombian vallenato composer and performer
- May 15 – Wayman Tisdale, 44, NBA basketball player and smooth jazz bass guitarist
- May 18
  - Wayne Allwine, 62, American voice artist (Mickey Mouse)
  - Roderick "Dolla" Burton II, 21, American rapper
- May 24 – Jay Bennett, 45, American multi-instrumentalist (Wilco)
- June 3 – Koko Taylor, 80, American blues singer
- June 7
  - Hugh Hopper, 64, English progressive rock and jazz fusion bass guitarist
  - Kenny Rankin, 69 American pop and jazz musician
- June 14 – Bob Bogle, 75, American guitarist (The Ventures)
- June 18 – Ali Akbar Khan, 87, Indian sarod player
- June 25
  - Michael Jackson, 50, American entertainer
  - Sky Saxon, 63, American rock singer and bass guitarist (The Seeds)
- June 27 – Fayette Pinkney, 61, American singer (The Three Degrees)
- June 30 – Harve Presnell, 75, American singer and actor

=== July–August ===
- July 2 – Susan Fernandez, 52, Filipina activist and singer
- July 4
  - Jim Chapin, American drummer, 89
  - Allen Klein, 77, American record label executive
  - Drake Levin, 62, American guitarist (Paul Revere & the Raiders)
- July 8 – Midnight, 47, American singer-songwriter (Crimson Glory)
- July 11 – Angie Pirog, 18, Canadian folk singer/guitarist
- July 16 – D. K. Pattammal, 90, Indian classical singer
- July 17 – Gordon Waller, 64, British singer (Peter and Gordon)
- July 21
  - Andrew Thomas, 63, German singer (Bad Boys Blue)
  - Gangubai Hangal, 96, Indian classical singer
  - Marcel Jacob, 45, Swedish bassist
- July 26 – Merce Cunningham, 90, American dancer, choreographer
- July 27 – George Russell, 86, American composer
- August 6 – Willy DeVille, 58, American musician
- August 12 – Rashied Ali, 74, American drummer
- August 13 – Les Paul, 94, American jazz guitarist and inventor of solid-body electric guitar and multi-track recording
- August 18 – Hildegard Behrens, 72, German opera singer
- August 28 – DJ AM, 36, American turntabalist and celebrity disc jockey (Crazy Town)

=== September–October ===
- September 1 – Erich Kunzel, 74, American conductor
- September 7 – Fred Mills, 74, Canadian trumpeter
- September 11 – Jim Carroll, 60, American writer and punk singer (Jim Carroll Band)
- September 14 – Patrick Swayze, 57, American actor, dancer, and singer-songwriter
- September 16 – Mary Travers, 72, American folk singer (Peter, Paul and Mary)
- September 17 – Leon Kirchner, 90, American composer
- September 19 – Roc Raida, 37, American turntablist (The X-Ecutioners)
- September 24 – Sir Howard Morrison, 74, New Zealand entertainer (heart attack)
- September 25 – Alicia de Larrocha, 86, Spanish pianist and composer
- October 4 – Mercedes Sosa, 74, Argentinian singer
- October 5 – Mike Alexander, 32, British bassist (Evile)
- October 7 – Steve Ferguson, 60, American rock guitarist (NRBQ)
- October 9 – Arturo Cavero, 68, Peruvian singer
- October 10 – Stephen Gately, 33, Irish pop singer (Boyzone)
- October 12
  - Dickie Peterson, 61, American bassist (Blue Cheer)
  - Ian Wallace, 90, British singer
- October 13 – Al Martino, 82, American singer
- October 17 – Vic Mizzy, 93, American composer
- October 28 – Taylor Mitchell, 19, Canadian folk singer-songwriter

=== November–December ===
- November 8 – Jerry Fuchs, 34, American drummer (!!!, Maserati)
- November 15 – Derek B, 44, British rapper
- November 22 – Haydain Neale, 39, Canadian soul/R&B singer (jacksoul)
- December 2 – Eric Woolfson, 64, Scottish musician (The Alan Parsons Project)
- December 4 – Liam Clancy, 74, Irish Musician (The Clancy Brothers and Tommy Makem)
- December 9 – Faramarz Payvar, 76, composer and santur player
- December 20 – James Gurley, 69, American musician (Big Brother and the Holding Company)
- December 25 – Vic Chesnutt, 45, American musician
- December 28 – James "The Rev" Sullivan, 28, American drummer (Avenged Sevenfold)
- December 30 – Rowland S. Howard, 50, Australian guitarist (The Birthday Party)
