= Different Fur =

Recording studio in San Francisco.

Coordinates: 37.760339°N 122.420895°W

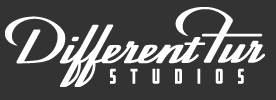
- Industry: Software & Programming
- Founded: 1968
- Founder: Patrick Gleeson; John Vieira
- Headquarters: Mission District, San Francisco, California
- Website: differentfurstudios.com

Different Fur Studios (formerly Different Fur Trading Company) is a recording studio located in the Mission District area of San Francisco, California, at 3470 19th Street. Since 1968, Different Fur has recorded music from a wide range of artists, including major Grammy and Oscar-winning musicians as well as many important independent musicians.

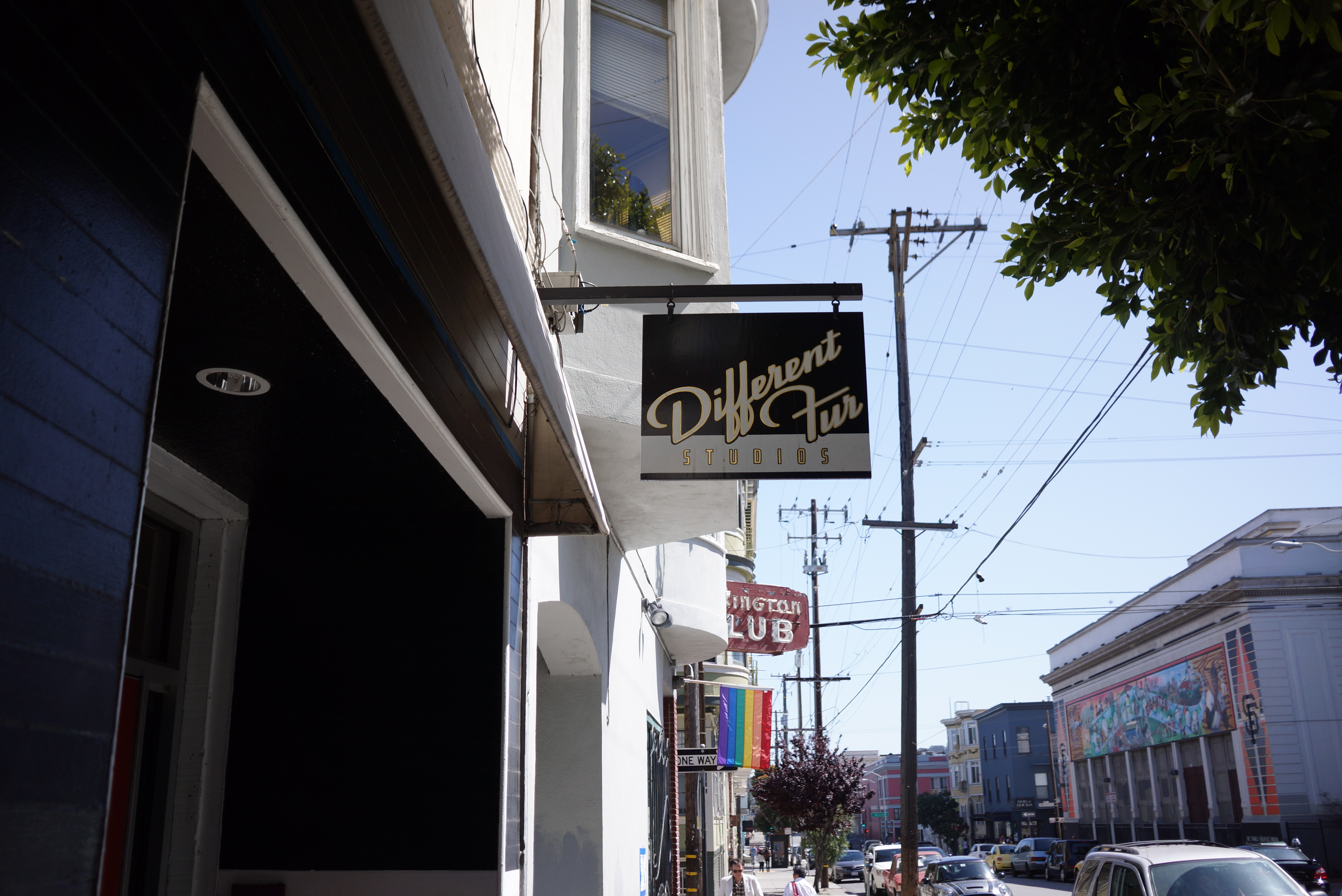
Location in the Mission District, San Francisco, next to The Lexington Club

== History ==
Different Fur was founded in 1968 by the electronic music composer and keyboardist Patrick Gleeson and John Vieira. Its name was suggested by poet Michael McClure, while he was being recorded by Gleeson. By the early 1970s Gleeson was doing sessions with Jefferson Starship on his recently acquired 8-track recorder and Moog synthesizer. It was his expertise in early synthesizers, like the Moog, which eventually led Gleeson to collaborations with Herbie Hancock, whom Gleeson credits with helping Different Fur get off the ground. By 1971 Gleeson was working with Hancock on his albums Crossings and Sextant. He went on to record many of the synthesizers on Hancock's master work Head Hunters, as well as several solo albums at Different Fur.

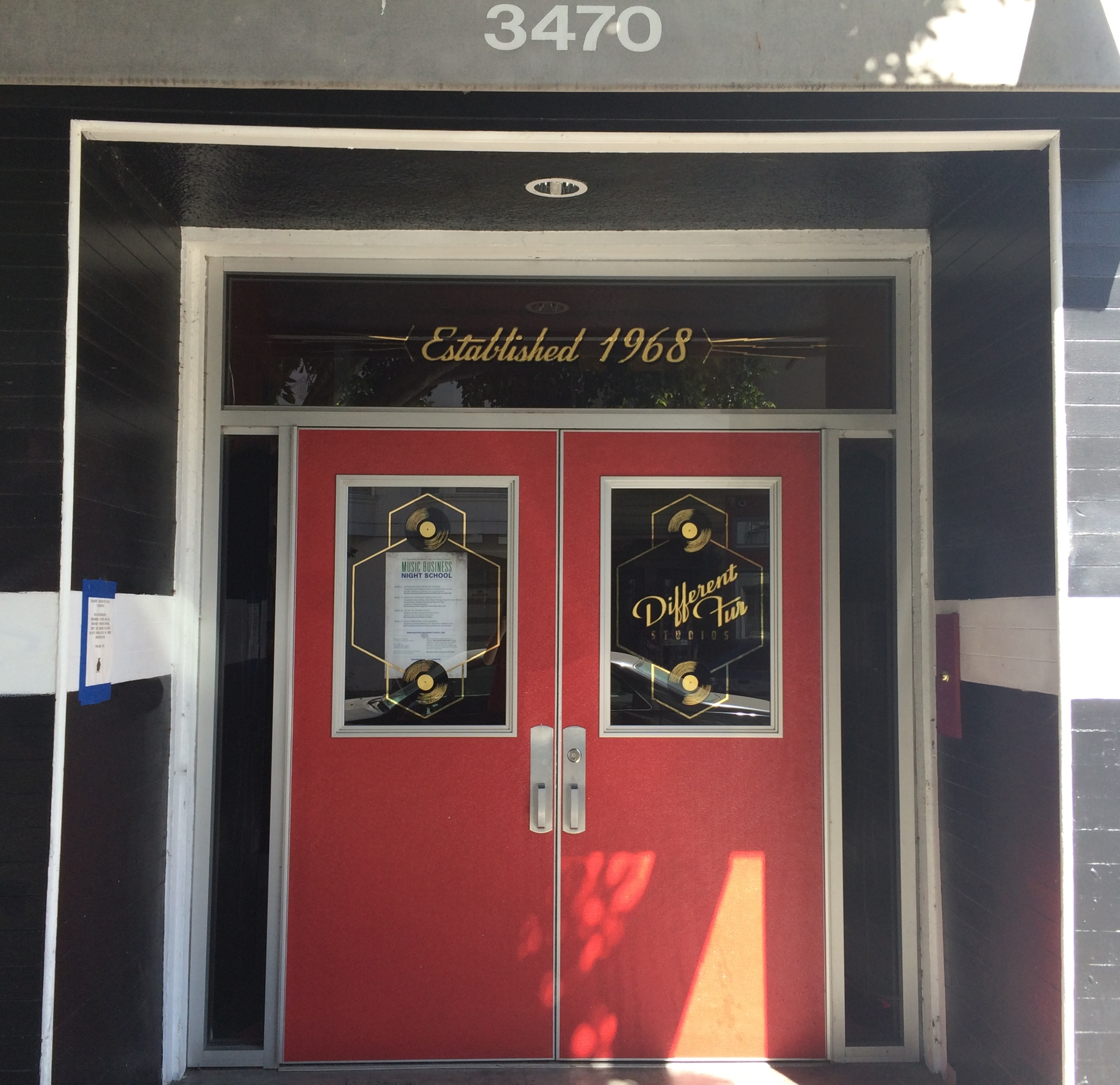
Front door of recording studio

Gleeson eventually sold Different Fur in 1985. However, it still remains an active recording studio (current 2026). Since 2007, the studio has been owned by engineer Patrick Brown.

In February 2009, the relatively unknown and very recently signed to Fat Possum band Wavves filmed a video with bloggers yourstru.ly. The project was a three-part live filming of the two-piece band playing some of the songs off their new EP including "So Bored." While the original videos only received modest views after release, they marked the beginning of an ongoing partnership between Different Fur engineers and YoursTruly video producers that have resulted in live sessions with The Morning Benders, Chromeo, Little Dragon, Big K.R.I.T., Toro Y Moi, P.O.S, Girls, Freddie Gibbs, Death Cab For Cutie etc.

Artists who have recorded at Different Fur include Neil Young, Phil Collins, Brian Eno, David Byrne, Devo, The Units, Kronos Quartet, Stevie Wonder, Van Morrison, Sylvester, Bobby Hutcherson, Primus, Al Di Meola, Joe Henderson, William Ackerman, Bobby McFerrin, Gene Clark, Michael Hedges, Terry Riley, Earth, Wind & Fire, Alan Hovhaness, Joe Satriani, The Residents, Erasure, Mr. Bungle, Autopsy, Yo-Yo Ma, John Zorn, Rodrigo y Gabriela, The Morning Benders, Bob Mould, Black Lips, Daniel Selby, OneRepublic, Tristan Prettyman, among many others.

Music for Peanuts TV Specials and parts of the soundtrack of Apocalypse Now have been recorded there.

Different Fur was featured in the SF Weekly Music section on June 15, 2011. The article focuses on work done with a number of local bands and artists.

== Selected discography ==
2012

- Sourpatch - Stagger and Fade
- A B & The Sea - Constant Vacation
- Lilac - Christine
- The Park featuring Darondo and Happy Mayfield - The Silvercloud Time Machine (7")
- Nate Mercereau - $1,000,000 Worth of Twang
- Midi Matilda - Love & The Movies (single)
- Starred - No Good (single)

2011

- Dylan Fox and The Wave - Tunnel Vision
- Bird Call - Other Creatures
- A B & The Sea - Run Run Run!
- NeaCombo Diffuzion - Round 2 Digital Attack
- Lowered - (Mastering)
- Alessandra - So Nice
- The Park - The Process...
- The Park - These Are The Days
- The Park - Belleville (single)
- Zodiac Death Valley - Zodiac Death Valley
- Le Panique - Saturday Matinee
- Lilac - Lilac
- The Cold Volts - People Noise
- Ash Reiter - Heatwave
- Skin & Bones featuring Izza Kizza and Bernie Worrell - Holdin' Back (single)
- Skin & Bones - Stomp / Pop Painkillaz (remix) (single)

2010

- Flexx Bronco - Volume 2: Off the Record
- A B & The Sea - Boys and Girls
- A B & The Sea - Christmas (Baby Please Come Home)
- The Morning Benders - Big Echo
- Big K.R.I.T. & Grillade - The Wuz Here Sessions
- Michael Franti & Spearhead - The Sound of Sunshine
- Gomorran Social Aid Club - The Gomorran Social Aid and Pleasure Club
- The Gomorrans - Giving Birth To Love
- Victor Harris - Midnight at Malibu: The Essential Victor Harris (Omega Records)

2009

- The Morning Benders - iTunes exclusive
- Trainwreck Riders - The Perch
- A B & The Sea - Suzie/Yellow-Haired Girl (single)
- So Many Wizards - Tree
- Skin & Bones featuring Chris Chu, Bernie Worrell, and 88 keys - Lemonade (single)

2008

- Michael Franti & Spearhead - All Rebel Rockers
- OneRepublic - Live Session (iTunes exclusive)
- Loquat - Secrets Of The Sea (2008)
- Tristan Prettyman - Live Session (iTunes exclusive)
- Mister Loveless - Two Words
- The Morning Benders - Talking Through Tin Cans
- The Blakes - Live Session (iTunes exclusive)
- Tegan and Sara - Live Session (iTunes exclusive)
- Rupa & the April Fishes - Extraordinary Rendition
- LoCura - Animas
- Alison Harris - Smoke rings in the sky
- Morley - Seen
- Big Light - Big Light
- Amos Lee - Live Session (iTunes exclusive)

2007

- Black Lips - Live Session (iTunes exclusive)
- Chow Nasty - Super Electrical Recordings
- The Mother Hips - Kiss the Crystal Flake
- Rodrigo y Gabriela - Live Session (iTunes exclusive)
- Mew - Live Session (iTunes exclusive)
- Jack Ingram - Live Session (iTunes exclusive)
- Gomez - Live Session (iTunes exclusive)
- Leni Stern - Africa
- Specimen - Electric Ballroom
- Jetboy - The Glam Years
- The Most Holy Trinity - Rituals for Parting
- Gravy Train!!!! - All The Sweet Stuff

Early 2000s (decade)

- Transdub Massiv - Negril To Kingston City
- Re:ignition - Empty Heart Loaded Gun
- FM Fatale - Soft Life for Killers
- Karpov - Soliloquy
- Evening - Other Victorians
- Vienna Teng - Dreaming Through The Noise
- Hey Willpower - P.D.A. (US Bonus Track) (single)

1990s

- Fantômas - Fantômas
- Mr. Bungle - California
- Sylvester - Step II
- George Winston - Linus & Lucy: The Music of Vince Guaraldi
- George Winston - Forest
- George Winston - Summer
- Mr. Bungle - Mr. Bungle
- Primus - Sailing the Seas of Cheese
- Autopsy - Mental Funeral
- Primus - Frizzle Fry
- Phil Collins - Serious Hits... Live!

1980s

- Bobby Brown - Don't Be Cruel
- Earth, Wind & Fire - Touch the World
- Brian Eno & David Byrne - My Life in the Bush of Ghosts
- Patrick Gleeson - Rainbow Delta
- Kronos Quartet - Symbiosis
- Jonathan Richman and The Modern Lovers - "Rockin' And Romance"
- Joe Satriani - Flying in a Blue Dream
- Daniel Selby - Finishing Touches
- Whispers - Just Gets Better with Time
- George Winston - Winter to Spring
- George Winston - December
- George Winston - Autumn
- Erasure - Dreamlike State (B side to Star)
- Stevie Wonder - Characters

1970s

- Shigeru Suzuki - Band Wagon
- Devo - Come Back Jonee and Shrivel-Up from Q. Are We Not Men? A: We Are Devo!
- Coke Escovedo - Comin' at Ya
- Coke Escovedo - Disco Fantasy
- Pablo Cruise - A Place in the Sun
- Lenny White - Big City
- Patrick Gleeson - Patrick Gleeson's Star Wars
- Patrick Gleeson - Beyond the Sun - An Electronic Portrait of Holst's "The Planets"
- Bobby Hutcherson - Waiting
- Herbie Hancock - Thrust
- Herbie Hancock - Head Hunters
- Herbie Hancock - Sextant
- Herbie Hancock - Crossings
- Brian Auger and the Oblivion Express - Happiness Heartaches
