= 2009 in classical music =

== Events ==
- September 12 – Australian radio station ABC Classic FM reveals the results of its Classic 100 Symphony poll. The winner is Dvořák's Symphony no. 9 – From the New World.
- October – With the release of his new album Nightbook, Ludovico Einaudi takes a new direction, incorporating synthesized sounds alongside his solo piano playing.

== New works ==
The following composers' works were composed, premiered, or published this year, as noted in the citation.

=== A ===
- John Adams – String Quartet No. 2
- Thomas Adès – Lieux Retrouvés, for cello and piano
- Kalevi Aho – Hommage á Schubert, string quintet

=== B ===
- Richard Barrett – Mesopotamia for 17 instruments and electronics
- Harrison Birtwistle – The Corridor, scena for two singers and ensemble
- John Brunning – Sahara, for guitar

=== C ===
- Elliott Carter
  - Duettino, for violin and cello
  - Figment V, for marimba
- Ludovico Einaudi – Nightbook
- Lorenzo Ferrero
  - Op.111 – Bagatella su Beethoven, for piano solo
  - Concerto for Piano and Orchestra No. 2
  - Fantasy Suite No. 2, for violin and orchestra
  - Three Simple Songs, for flute, clarinet, violin, violoncello and piano
  - Tourists and Oracles, for eleven instruments and piano four-hands

=== F ===
- Francesco Filidei – Ogni gesto d'amore, for violoncello and orchestra

=== G ===
- Howard Goodall – Enchanted Voices
- Philip Glass
  - Concerto for Violin and Orchestra, No. 2, "The American Four Seasons", premiere in December
  - Sonata for Violin and Piano
  - String Sextet
- Sofia Gubaidulina – Fachwerk, for bayan, percussion and string orchestra

=== H ===
- Mehdi Hosseini
  - Baluch, for alto flute, contrabassoon, horn, xylophone, violin and cello
  - Peshtpa, for oboe, bass clarinet and violoncello

=== L ===
- Magnus Lindberg – Graffiti, for chorus and orchestra

=== M ===
- Frederik Magle – Symphonic suite Cantabile, premiere June 10 in Koncerthuset, Copenhagen

=== R ===
- Christopher Rouse – Odna Zhizn

=== S ===
- David Sawer – Rumpelstiltskin
- Steven Stucky – Dust Devil, for solo marimba

=== T ===
- John Tavener
  - Tu ne sais pas, for mezzo-soprano, timpani and stings
  - The Peace that Passeth Understanding, for choir
- Mark-Anthony Turnage – Five Processionals, for clarinet, violin, cello and piano

== Opera premieres ==
Operas that premiered in 2009 include:

- Kepler by Philip Glass, September 20, Landesthater Linz, Austria
- Aquarius by Karel Goeyvaerts, June 9, Antwerp
- The Letter by Paul Moravec, July 25, Santa Fe Opera
- Sparkie: Cage and Beyond by Michael Nyman, with Carsten Nicolai
- Brief Encounter by André Previn, May 1, Houston Grand Opera
- The Lunch Box by Thanapoom Sirichang, March 26, Hobart, Tasmania
- Prima Donna by Rufus Wainwright, July, Palace Theatre, Manchester

== Albums ==
- Nicola Benedetti – Fantasie
- Bradley Joseph – Suites & Sweets
- Julian Lloyd Webber – Romantic Cello Concertos
- Hayley Westenra – Winter Magic

== Musical films ==
- La Danse
- Mao's Last Dancer
- Pianomania
- The Soloist

== Deaths ==
- January 13 – Mansour Rahbani, 83, Lebanese composer
- January 14 – Angela Morley, 84, English conductor and composer
- January 15 – Veronica Dudarova, 92, Russian symphony conductor
- January 23 – George Perle, 93, American composer and theorist
- January 31 – Erland von Koch, 98, Swedish composer
- February 1 – Lukas Foss, 86, American pianist, conductor and composer
- February 24
  - Svatopluk Havelka, 83, Czech composer
  - Pearl Lang, 87, American dancer and choreographer
- March 29 – Maurice Jarre, 84, French composer
- April 10 – Richard Arnell, 91, English composer
- June 22 – Betty Allen, 82, American mezzo-soprano
- July 16 – D. K. Pattammal, 90, Indian classical singer
- July 27– George Russell, 86, American composer
- August 18 – Hildegard Behrens, 72, German opera singer
- September 1 – Erich Kunzel, 74, American conductor
- September 17 – Leon Kirchner, 90, American composer
- September 25 – Alicia de Larrocha, 86, Spanish pianist and composer
- October 12 – Ian Wallace, 90, British singer

== Major awards ==
=== Classical Brits ===
- Male of the Year — Gustavo Dudamel
- Female of the Year — Alison Balsom
- Composer of the Year — Howard Goodall
- Young British Classical Performer — Alina Ibragimova
- Album of the Year — Royal Scots Dragoon Guards Spirit of the Glen–Journey
- Soundtrack of the Year — The Dark Knight — Hans Zimmer and James Newton Howard
- Critics' Award — Sir Charles Mackerras/Scottish Chamber Orchestra — Mozart Symphonies nos. 38–41
- Lifetime Achievement In Music — José Carreras

=== Grammy Awards ===
- See 51st Grammy Awards

== See also ==
- 2009 in music
