= Out in the Light =

Studio album by WATERS
- Released: September 9, 2011
- Recorded: 2010
- Genre: Indie rock
- Length: 36:31
- Label: TBD Records
- Producer: John Congleton

WATERS chronology
| Out in the Light (2011) | It All Might be OK EP (2014) |

Professional ratings
Review scores
| Source | Rating |
|---|---|
| Consequence of Sound | C+ |
| Drowned in Sound | 8/10 |

Out in the Light is the debut studio album by the American indie rock band WATERS, released in 2011 on TBD Recordings.

== Critical reception ==
Drowned in Sound wrote that Pierszalowski's "heart is worn clearly on his sleeve without becoming too overbearing and the final product is nothing short of profound."

== Track listing ==
| No. | Title | Length |
|---|---|---|
| 1. | "For the One" | 3:01 |
| 2. | "O Holy Break of Day" | 3:57 |
| 3. | "Out in the Light" | 3:32 |
| 4. | "Back to You" | 2:48 |
| 5. | "Ones You Had Before" | 4:05 |
| 6. | "Abridge My Love" | 2:57 |
| 7. | "If I Run" | 3:49 |
| 8. | "Take Me Out to the Coast" | 3:55 |
| 9. | "San Francisco" | 4:08 |
| 10. | "Mickey Mantle" | 4:21 |

== Personnel ==
- Van Pierszalowski – lead vocals, guitar
- Nikolai Haukeland – guitar, bass
- Sigmund Nilsen – drums
- Marte Solbakken – keys, vocals
