= Caleb Green =

Caleb Green may refer to:

- Caleb Green (singer)
- Caleb Green (basketball)
