= Caleb Nichols =

American musician

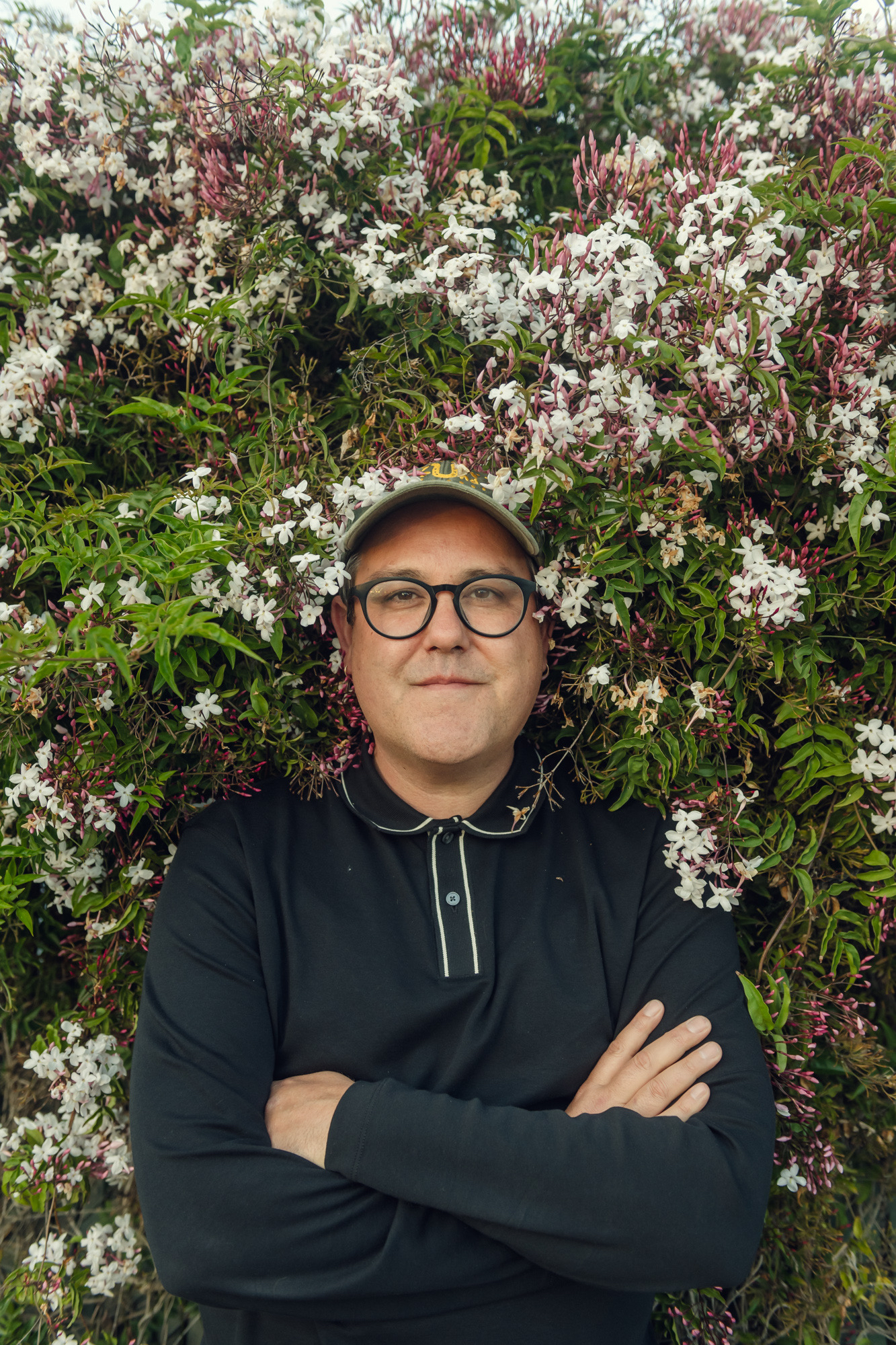
- Nichols, 2024

Background information
- Born: November 22, 1982 (age 43); Kirkland, Washington State, US
- Origin: California, United States
- Genres: Acoustic, folk, indie rock
- Occupations: Musician, poet
- Label: Kill Rock Stars
- Website: calebnicholsis.gay

Caleb Nichols is an American non-binary poet and musician recording on the Kill Rock Stars roster. He was previously a member of Port O'Brien. Caleb Nichols' first EP on Kill Rock Stars, 'Clarion' was released in October 2021. His debut solo EP, a 'queer rock opera' that explored the backstory of the Beatles character 'Mean Mr. Mustard', was released in June 2022.

== Discography ==
=== Albums ===
- Clarion EP (2021), Kill Rock Stars
- Ramon (2022), Kill Rock Stars
- Let's Look Back (2023), Kill Rock Stars
- Chan Says / She Is Not Your Shadow (2023), Kill Rock Stars

=== Books ===
- 22 Lunes (2020), Unsolicited Press
- Teems///\\\\Recedes (2021), Kelp Books
- Don't Panic: A Hitchhiker's Guide to Panic and Anxiety (2022), Broken Sleep
- Chan Says & Other Songs (2023), Bottlecap Press
- Soft Animal / O Anima (2023), Gasher Press
- One For Sorrow, Two For Joy (2024), Broken Sleep
