= Pop Etc (album) =

Studio album by Pop Etc
- Released: June 12, 2012
- Length: 39:46
- Label: Rough Trade
- Producer: Christopher Chu; Danger Mouse; Andrew Dawson

Pop Etc chronology
Pop Etc (2012)	Souvenir (2016)

Singles from Pop Etc
- 1. "Keep It for Your Own" Released: May 14, 2012

Professional ratings
Aggregate scores
Source	Rating
Metacritic	53/100
Review scores
Source	Rating
AllMusic	3/5 stars
The A.V. Club	B+
Beats Per Minute	35%
Consequence of Sound	F
The Line of Best Fit	2/10
NME	3.5/5 stars
Pitchfork	2.5/10
PopMatters	4/10
Under the Radar	5/10

Pop Etc is the debut self-titled studio album by indie pop band Pop Etc, formerly known as the Morning Benders. It was released on June 12, 2012, under Rough Trade Records.

== Background ==
On March 26, 2012, Pop Etc announced they were changing their name from the Morning Benders.

Danger Mouse and Andrew Dawson helped produce the album.

== Release ==
Pop Etc announced they were releasing their first album under their new name, for June 12, 2012.

On May 14, 2012, the band released the first single "Keep It for Your Own".

== Critical reception ==
Pop Etc was met with "mixed or average" reviews from critics. At Metacritic, which assigns a weighted average rating out of 100 to reviews from mainstream publications, this release received an average score of 53 based on 12 reviews.

In a review for AllMusic, Fred Thomas said: "The songs that don't work really don't work, and their insincere atmosphere makes even the production feel artless and put-on. POP ETC's vie for commercial radio appeal ends up feeling like watching your little brother come home from his first year of college trying on an overexcited new style, complete with awkward slang and ill-fitting fashions." At Beats Per Minute, Rob Hakimian wrote: "Unfortunately, instead of putting together an interesting mix of influences, POP ETC have ended up with a set of songs that remain squarely within a basic structure based around looping electronics and obvious vocal hooks. Taken at face value there are a number of songs that are undeniable ear worms, mainly due to Chu's ability to consistently come up with catchy vocal melodies, but also because these songs are packed with large and colorful melodies."

Writing for Under the Radar, critic Ryan Hamm gave the release a 5 out of 10, explaining: "Instead of guitars, spacey drums and echoing harmonies, POP ETC features groove-y synths, drum machines, and lots of Auto-Tune. Overall, the experiments on POP ETC fall flat. The songs tend to be pale imitations of real pop and R&B, sounding a bit arch and ironic instead of sincere and believable."

== Track listing ==
Pop Etc track listing
No.	Title	Writer(s)	Length
1.	"New Life"	Christopher Chu; Jonathan Chu	4:19
2.	"Back to Your Heart"	C. Chu	3:05
3.	"Halfway to Heaven"	C. Chu	3:20
4.	"Keep It for Your Own"	Brian Burton; C. Chu	4:13
5.	"Live It Up"	C. Chu	3:11
6.	"Everything Is Gone"	C. Chu	3:11
7.	"R.Y.B."	C. Chu	3:24
8.	"Why'd You Do It Honey?"	C. Chu	3:04
9.	"I Wanna Be Your Man"	C. Chu	3:58
10.	"C-O-M-M-U-N-I-C-A-T-E"	C. Chu	4:05
11.	"Yoyo"	C. Chu	3:56
Total length:			39:46
