= Souvenir (Pop Etc album) =

Studio album by Pop Etc
- Released: January 29, 2016
- Length: 35:37
- Label: Self-released

Pop Etc chronology
Pop Etc (2012)	Souvenir (2016)	Half (2018)

Singles from Souvenior
- 1. "Running in Circles" Released: February 24, 2015; 2. "What Am I Becoming?" Released: January 20, 2016

Professional ratings
Aggregate scores
Source	Rating
Metacritic	60/100
Review scores
Source	Rating
AllMusic	3/5 stars

Souvenir is the second album by indie pop band Pop Etc under their new name. Including their albums as the Morning Benders, it is the band's fourth album. The album was self-released on January 29, 2016. The album contained their first single to chart, "What Am I Becoming?", which reached 33 on the US Alternative Songs chart.

== Track listing ==
Souvenir track listing
No.	Title	Length
1.	"Please Don't Forget Me"	3:18
2.	"Vice"	3:37
3.	"I Wanted to Change the World But the World Changed Me"	3:52
4.	"Running in Circles"	3:42
5.	"What Am I Becoming?"	3:37
6.	"Backwards World"	4:30
7.	"Your Heart Is a Weapon"	2:50
8.	"Beating My Head Against the Wall"	3:13
9.	"Bad Break"	3:32
10.	"I'm Only Dreaming"	3:26
Total length:		35:37
