= Port O'Brien =

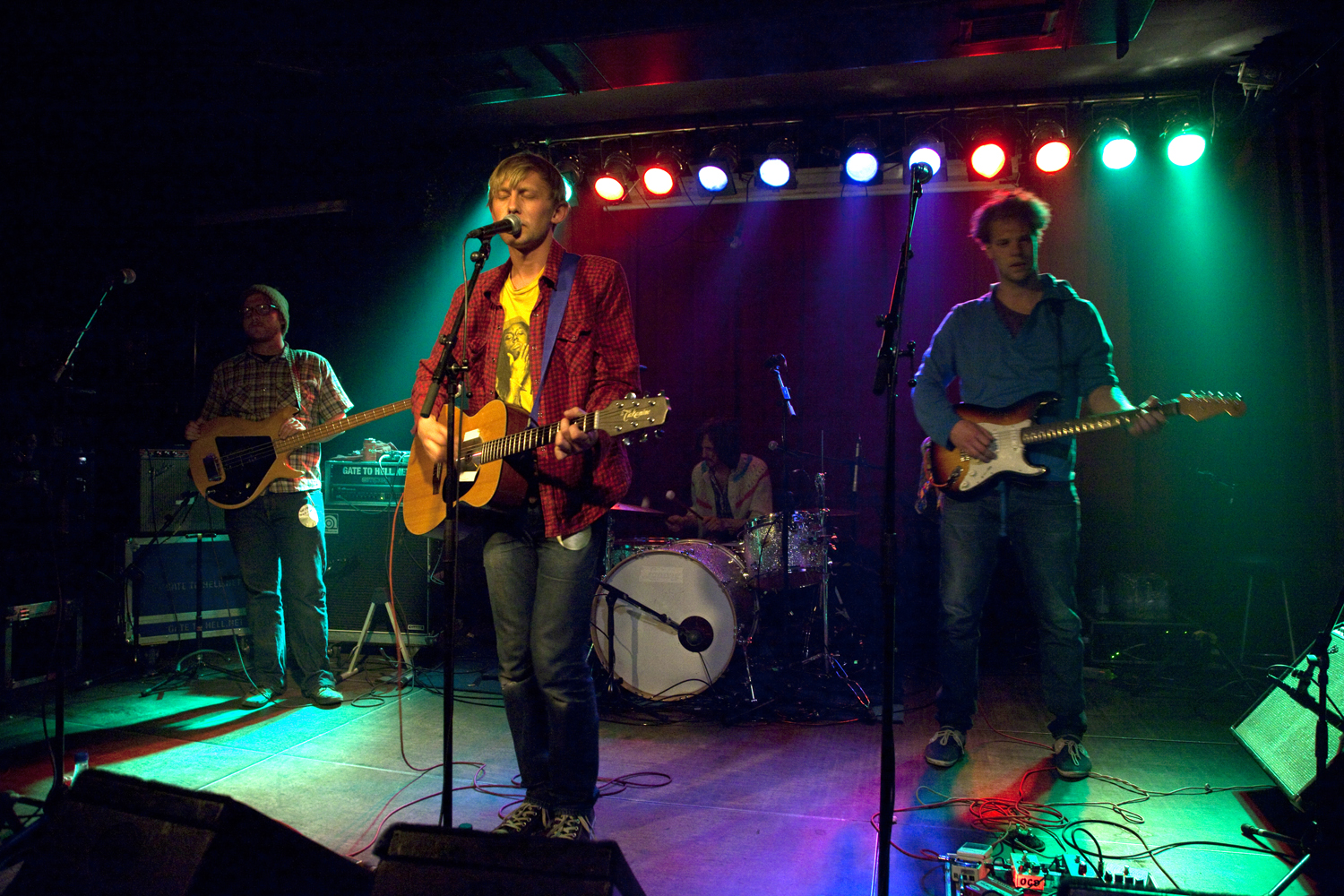
- Port O'Brien in Barcelona (2010)

Background information
- Origin: California, United States
- Genres: Acoustic, folk, indie rock
- Years active: 2005–2011
- Labels: TBD Records, City Slang Records (Europe)
- Members: Van Pierszalowski; Cambria Goodwin; Ryan Stively
- Past members: Caleb Nichols; Joshua Barnhart; Zebedee Zaitz; Graham LeBron; Tyson Vogel; Nikolai Haukeland
- Website: portobrien.com

Port O'Brien was an American musical group combining elements of acoustic, folk and indie rock.

They were named after a bay in Alaska featuring a now-abandoned cannery on Kodiak Island where founder member Van Pierszalowski's parents met. They started out as a folk music duo of Cambria Goodwin and Van Pierszalowski while Cambria was living in Cambria, California and Van was living in Oakland. After Cambria moved closer to Oakland they added a rhythm section composed of Caleb Nichols and Joshua Barnhart.

The band has toured nationally with artists such as Nada Surf, Bright Eyes and The Cave Singers and toured Europe with Modest Mouse, as well as receiving favourable reviews from Pitchfork Media, Allmusic, and The Times. M. Ward named Port O'Brien his "favorite new band".

To date the band has released four albums; Their debut album called When the Rain Comes on Tecolote Records. A compilation of tracks from their hard to find first album and EP called The Wind and the Swell on American Dust Records and a studio-recorded album All We Could Do Was Sing on City Slang Records, and their latest studio album Threadbare on TBD Records.

Shortly before the release of their first studio album "All We Could Do Was Sing," Caleb Nichols left the band and was replaced by Ryan Stively, who remained in the band until their last shows. Joshua Barnhart was replaced by Two Gallants drummer Tyson Vogel before the completion of the last studio-recorded album "Threadbare."

"I Woke Up Today" from the album All We Could Do Was Sing was recently used as the backing music for several Dulux Paints television advertisement in Australia. The band toured Australia in February 2009 as part of the St Jerome's Laneway Festival.

Port O'Brien's new album, Threadbare, was released on 6 October 2009. The band was dissolved in 2011, and Van Pierszalowski recorded an album in Oslo for a new project called Waters. The album was titled "Out in the Light", and was released on September 19 on City Slang records in the UK and Europe, and on September 20 on TBD Records in the United States. In 2014, Waters signed with Vagrant Records and released a new EP called "It All Might Be OK."

== Discography ==
=== Albums ===
- When the Rain Comes (2005), Tecolote Records
- The Wind and the Swell (compilation album) (2007), American Dust
- All We Could Do Was Sing (2008), City Slang
- Threadbare (2009), TBD Records

=== EPs ===
- Nowhere To Run (2006), Tecolote Records
- Winter (2009), City Slang

=== Singles ===
- "I Woke Up Today" (2007)
- "Close the Lid" (2007)
- "The Whiskey Song" (2009)
- "Tree Bones" (2009)
