= Mister Loveless =

American rock band

- Origin: Walnut Creek, California, U.S.A.
- Genres: Alternative rock, indie rock, post-punk
- Years active: 2003–2013
- Label: Shady Glen Records
- Past members: Daniel Brown; Nick Clark; Sean Gaffney; Charlie Koliha; Ed Melendez; Rob I. Miller; Rachael Travers

Mister Loveless was an American rock band that formed in Walnut Creek, California, in 2003. Mister Loveless went through many line-up changes, with Rob I. Miller (lead vocals, rhythm guitar) and Charlie Koliha (bass guitar) being the only members present through all incarnations. Mister Loveless was named one of the Top 20 Bay Area Bands of 2011 by San Francisco Bay Area modern rock radio station Live 105. The band performed alongside noteworthy acts such as Black Francis, The Wedding Present, Beach Fossils, and Thee Oh Sees.

== History ==
=== Formation ===
Miller and Koliha formed Mister Loveless in high school with several friends. Koliha taught Miller how to play guitar, and Miller began writing songs instantly. When high school friends left for college, Miller and Koliha recruited Ed Melendez to play drums. Sean Gaffney began playing lead guitar based on a particularly intense performance he had given during a high school talent show. Melendez was eventually replaced with drummer Rachael Travers.

The band is named after Miller's memorably-named sixth grade teacher.

=== Early work ===
Mister Loveless self-released and self-distributed its debut album, My Share of Losing, in 2004.

The Two Words EP, comprising re-recorded versions of songs that had been released on a San Francisco local bands compilation album, Rose Hill Volume I, was recorded at Different Fur Studios. The EP accompanied the launch of Mister Loveless' own label, Shady Glen Records. The music from Two Words found its way into various skateboarding and snowboarding films, including Corey Duffel's Strange Notes.

Shortly after the release of Two Words, Mister Loveless returned to Different Fur studios with Duane Ramos to record “In Wonder”, a nearly six-minute-long song the band wanted to do a unique release for. This was released as a 7-inch single, with "June" as the B-side and "No One Knows" as a free download included with the purchase of the record.

"In Wonder" was used in the end credits of Transworld Skateboarding film Right Foot Forward. (9) This earned the band more support from the skateboarding community and landed it other placement opportunities with Transworld Surf, Transworld Snow, and Skullcandy Headphones.

=== Three Words EP ===
Following the success of "In Wonder" and Two Words, Mister Loveless recruited Nick Clark to play drums, who debuted with the band in July 2009. The band also began writing material for their Three Words EP.

The Three Words EP was a turning point for the group. It was a follow-up to Two Words in a sense, because it elaborated on using the number of words in the titles of the songs as a concept. However, it also represented a stylistic shift in production and songwriting. The singles “The Old Pain," “From Burning Bridges” and “Strange and Futureless” all charted on Specialty Radio.

The EP earned favorable reviews from SF Weekly, Performer Magazine, and various other online music publications.

=== Grow Up and 2012-2013 ===
With four releases and a handful of tours behind it, Mister Loveless began writing and recording its first full-length album. The band recruited Duane M. Ramos, with whom it had already worked on Three Words, to engineer and produce the album. This time, however, it was recorded entirely in Mister Loveless’s home studio/rehearsal space, Shady Glen Studios, located in Miller’s family’s garage in Walnut Creek. Additional mixing and production for the track "Wild Summer" was done by Matt Wallace. The result was the eleven-track album Grow Up, which was released on September 11, 2012.

The band recorded a cover of "Blue Christmas" with Meghan Elizabeth in December 2012.

Daniel Brown replaced Gaffney on lead guitar in early 2013. During 2013, Mister Loveless released music videos for their songs "Punk Like Me" and "Curfew." The band performed live at MacWorld 2013, SXSW 2013, and BFD 2013. In August 2013, fellow Bay Area band, The Bilinda Butchers remixed "Curfew."

=== Disbandment ===
On September 19, 2013, it was announced that bass player Charlie Kolhia had decided to leave the band. Miller made the decision to end the band entirely, writing, "I can’t do Mister Loveless without Charlie. However, I would be lying if I said I hadn’t begun to feel as though I had outgrown Mister Loveless as well. This band has become like an old jacket. I love it but, it just doesn’t fit right anymore." The group announced their break-up through their Facebook page and a post on their website.

== Musical style ==
Mister Loveless incorporated elements of late 1970s post-punk, pioneered by groups such as Joy Division, and late 1980s/early 1990s guitar-heavy rock music synonymous with bands like Pixies and Sonic Youth. The group used a collaborative approach to write its songs, while singer/guitarist Rob Miller wrote the lyrics and vocal melodies. The lyrical content in the band’s songs ranged from forever aging and remembering more youthful days to anxiety-ridden existential crises crippled by indecisiveness.

== Discography ==
My Share of Losing (2004)

Two Words EP (2008)

In Wonder - Single (2009)

Three Words EP (2010)

Grow Up (2012)

Final Recordings EP (2014)
