= Pop Etc =

American band

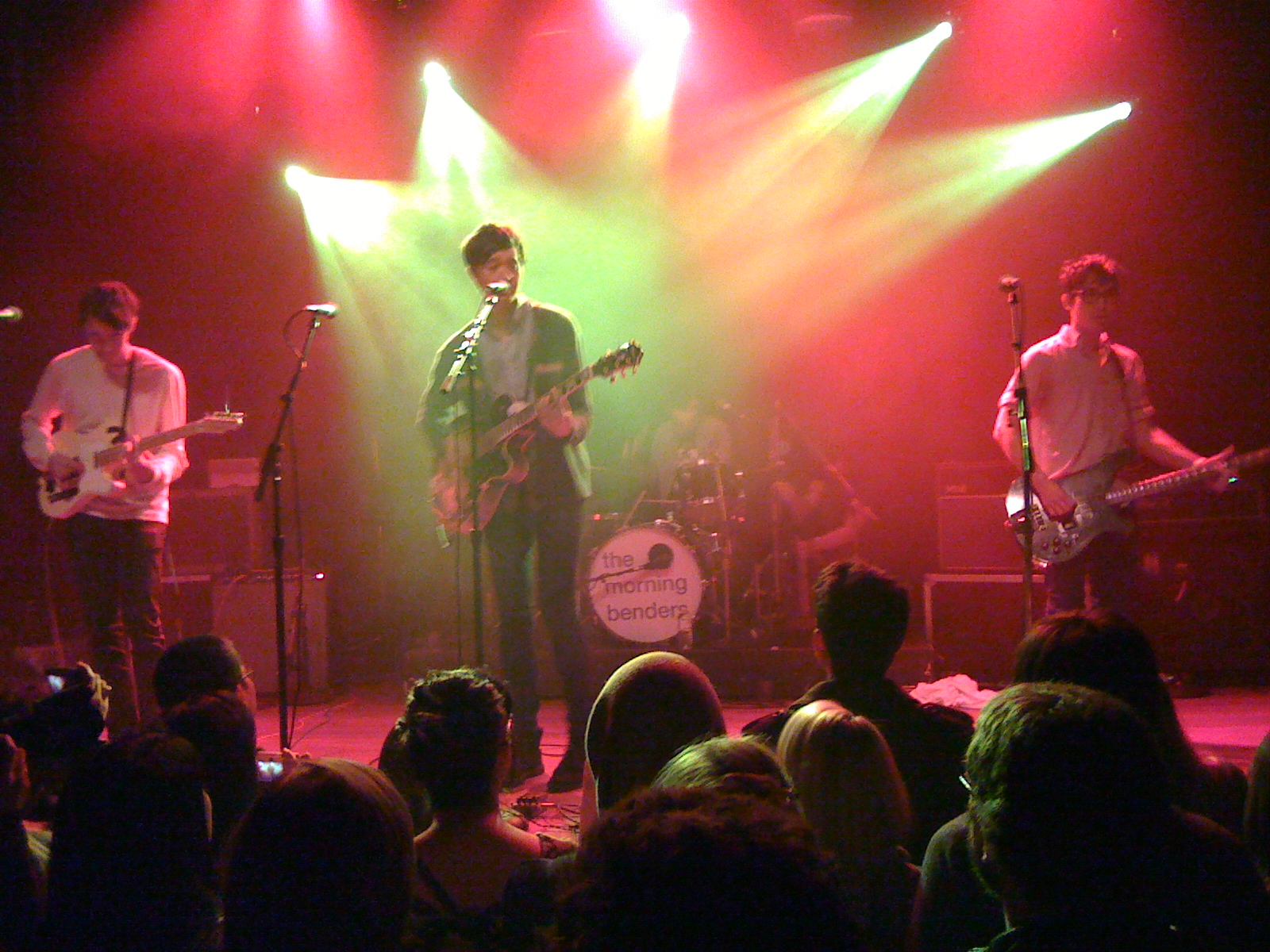
- The Morning Benders (now POP ETC) performing at Toronto's Mod Club Theatre in 2010

Background information
- Also known as: The Morning Benders
- Origin: Berkeley, California, United States
- Genres: Indie pop, indie rock, baroque pop, synthpop, new wave
- Years active: 2005–present
- Label: Rough Trade
- Members: Chris Chu; Jon Chu; Julian Harmon
- Past members: Tim Or; Joe Ferrell; Van Pierszalowski; Tom Peyton
- Website: www.popetcetera.com

Pop Etc (pronounced "pop et cetera"), formerly known as The Morning Benders, is an indie rock band. They originally formed in Berkeley, California but moved to Brooklyn, New York later in their career.

In 2008, they released their debut album Talking Through Tin Cans on +1 Records. The band has toured in support of Broken Bells (spring 2010), Grizzly Bear (fall 2009), The Kooks and Death Cab for Cutie (summer 2008), Ra Ra Riot (fall 2008), and has also played with Yo La Tengo, MGMT, Grand Archives, Yeasayer, Two Gallants, The Rosebuds, Au Revoir Simone, We Are Scientists, and White Rabbits. They also toured with Broken Bells and The Black Keys in 2010.

In December 2008, iTunes deemed Talking Through Tin Cans the best indie/alternative album of 2008. Earlier that year, they also received the "Editor's Pick" award. In March 2010, the music website Pitchfork deemed their second studio album, Big Echo, "Best New Music," and gave it an 8.2 rating.

On March 25, 2012, the band posted on Facebook and Twitter that their original name "The Morning Benders" would be changed to Pop Etc. The decision was made after the band discovered that the term 'bender' has negative connotations in certain countries outside the United States, particularly in the United Kingdom where the term can be used as a pejorative.

== History ==
=== THE START UP (2005–2008) ===
The Morning Benders began as a solo project for Chris Chu in 2005. Chu studied music at the University of California, Berkeley and spent his spare time recording songs from a laptop. He eventually formed a band with friends who he had met in UC Berkeley.

The Morning Benders began playing in local gigs, making friends on MySpace, emailing bloggers, and conversing with club promoters. This led to offers from various local independent labels to record an album. The Morning Benders chose +1 Records to support them in recording their albums.

In September 2006, The Morning Benders released their first EP titled “Loose Change.” At the time, Chris, Van Pierszalowski, Joe Ferrell, and Tom Peyton were included as band members. The EP was recorded on a laptop.

In early 2007, the Morning Benders released a second EP, Boarded Doors. The EP was recorded in the band's basement, which was also their practice space. During this time, Chris started to work as a studio engineer to help pay for his band's recordings.

=== Talking Through Tin Cans and the Bedroom Covers EP (2008) ===
Their debut album Talking Through Tin Cans was produced, engineered, and mixed by Chris Chu. It was released on their label +1 Records. The album's style was referred to as "So-Cal 60's pop". They toured with various acts, including The Kooks and Death Cab for Cutie. In December, iTunes called the album the best indie/alternative album of 2008. The members involved in this album were Chris Chu, Joe Ferrell, David Perales, and Julian Harmon.

The Morning Benders released the Bedroom Covers EP, on Gigantic, their old blog. The EP featured covers of many bands and artists including Velvet Underground, The Cardigans, Fleetwood Mac, and The Smiths. The cover artwork was done by Kyle Lee.

=== Tours in 2009 ===
In 2009, the Morning Benders toured the U.S. with The Submarines. Both bands covered each other's songs, with The Morning Benders doing a cover of "1940's", whilst the Submarines did a cover of "Waiting for a War." In March, they also performed at SXSW in Austin, Texas.

They performed with their friend John Vanderslice on May 19 at San Francisco's Rickshaw Stop. On May 20, they did a show at El Rey Theatre with The Walkmen. The Morning Benders toured the UK and Europe in early August. From August 28 through 30th, they played the Outside Lands Festival in San Francisco.

In October, they toured with Grizzly Bear, and in December, they toured with Girls.

=== The Grain of Salt EP and other releases (2009) ===
The Grain of Salt EP was released on February 24, 2009, and included songs such as "A Song" and "Your Dark Side." There was also a different version of "Grain of Salt" included as a bonus track. On July 7, 2009, iTunes released a Frank Sinatra tribute album, His Way, Our Way, which included The Morning Benders covering "Strangers in the Night". On December 15, 2009, The Morning Benders signed to Rough Trade Records to release their next album in early 2010.

=== Big Echo (2010) ===
Influenced by many contemporary bands and artists, including Phil Spector – who developed the "Wall of Sound" recording technique in the 1950s and 60s – Big Echo was recorded in eleven days and mixed on the twelfth day in Brooklyn. Chris Taylor from Grizzly Bear helped produce the album. "Excuses", the first track of the album, received many positive reviews. The second song, "Promises", had a music video focused on the theme of children growing up too fast. The album was released on March 9, 2010 on Rough Trade.

=== Post-Big Echo (2010–2011) ===
In 2010, Chris Chu's brother Jon replaced Joe Ferrell as the band's guitarist. They gathered with all their closest friends to play a live performance of "Excuses" on Yours Truly. The band moved to Brooklyn. In October 2010, they debuted their new song "Virgins" on La Blogothèque.

They had planned to have a tour in Tokyo, but because of the disastrous Japanese earthquake and tsunami, they had to cancel and reschedule. They released Japan Echo EP earlier in 2011, to support those affected by the resulting floods. The EP included many artists such as Twin Sister, Star Slinger, and Wild Nothing. In early August, the band was finally able to play at Summer Sonic in Tokyo and Osaka. In 2012, the band changed their name to POP ETC and released an album-length mixtape for free, followed by a self-titled album.

=== Souvenir (2016) ===
The band spent the years following the release of POP ETC writing material for a new record, later announced to be called Souvenir. They supported The Wombats on tour in 2015 and in January 2016, toured the Northeast U.S. with Oh Wonder.

=== Infinite Singles Collection and Half (2017–2018) ===
Beginning with "Routine" in March 2017, the band put out a series of singles, dubbed the Infinite Singles Collection, throughout 2017 and 2018. This was followed by the official announcement in August 2018 that their next album, Half, featuring many of the singles from the collection, would be released on October 3 of that year.

== Discography ==
=== Studio albums ===
- Talking Through Tin Cans (2008)
- Big Echo (2010)
- Pop Etc (2012)
- Souvenir (2016)
- Half (2018)

=== EPs ===
- Loose Change (2006)
- Boarded Doors (2007)
- Waiting for a War (2008)
- The Bedroom Covers (2008)
- Grain of Salt (2009)
- Lipstick (2009)
- Japan Echo (2011)

=== Singles ===
- Waiting For A War (2008)
- Damnit Anna (2008)
- Promises (2010)
- Go Grab a Stranger (2010)
- Virgins (2010)
- Running in Circles (2015)
- Same Mistake (2019)

=== Mixtapes ===
- Pop Etc Mixtape (2012)

=== Other releases ===
- The Bedroom Covers (2008)
- Lemonade - Skin & Bones (2009)

=== Compilation appearances ===
- His Way, Our Way (Frank Sinatra tribute album)
- Stroked: A Tribute to Is This It (The Strokes tribute album)
- The Twilight Saga: Breaking Dawn – Part 2 (soundtrack)
- Zankyou no Terror (Original Soundtrack)

== Production/songwriting contributions to other bands/artists ==
In 2010, Chris Chu produced So Many Wizard's album Love Songs for When You Leave Me.

In January 2011, Chris produced Chloe Makes Music's debut The Puppeteer, and was featured on the song "The Duel".

In October 2013, Chris produced Japanese rock band Galileo Galilei's album ALARMS; he also co-wrote their See More Glass EP.

In April 2014, Chris mixed the song "900 Hands" for the band Elskling.

In December 2014, Chris produced and wrote music for J-pop idol Kimura Kaela's album MIETA.

In April 2015, Chris co-wrote and produced WATERS' album 'What's Real, alongside Ryan Rabin from Grouplove.

In September 2016, Chris co-wrote "Revolution" by First Aid Kit and Van William.

In Spring and Summer 2017, Chris produced and co-wrote "Don't You Go" by Thai star Stamp Apiwat, in collaboration with the Thai band Polycat.

In May 2017, Chris co-wrote and produced WATERS' album Something More!

== In popular culture ==
An advertisement for Sony 3D televisions in Southeast Asia featured "Excuses".

An advertisement for Reese's peanut butter cups candy in the United States featured "Excuses".

"Excuses" is also featured in the episode "Chuck vs. Phase Three" on the TV series Chuck.

Torey Pudwill's skateboarding part for Transworld's Hallelujah featured "Excuses".

Burton's 2009 snowboard movie The B features the song "Waiting for a War" from Talking Through Tin Cans.

Top Gear (season 17, episode 5) references the band in a discussion about the Aston Martin Cygnet & Colette.

The intro of "Excuses" is now the theme song for The New Normal.

"Speak Up" is featured on the soundtrack for Breaking Dawn Part 2, the final installment of The Twilight Saga.

Shinichiro Watanabe's 2014 anime series Terror in Resonance features two original songs: "is", featured in episode 4; and "lava". Both songs' vocals are performed by Chris Chu, and feature lyrics written by Chu. Additionally, Keisuke Tominaga contributed to the lyrics for "is".

"Running in Circles" is included in a YouTube video uploaded by JonTron, in which Jon and his friend Ethan from h3h3Productions attempt to learn martial arts.

"Running in Circles" is included in an episode of the British television series Lovesick on Netflix.

"Same Mistake" is featured in season 2 episode 5 of New Amsterdam.
