= The Blakes (2007 album) =

Studio album by The Blakes
- Released: October 16, 2007
- Genre: Indie rock
- Label: Light In The Attic
- Producer: Martin Feveyear

The Blakes chronology
Little Whispers EP (2005)	The Blakes (2007)	Beads - No One Knows LP (2009)

The Blakes (2006)
- Cover art for the self-released LP

Professional ratings
Review scores
Source	Rating
Allmusic	3.5/5 stars

The Blakes LP is The Blakes' first commercially available album (previous releases were independent and available at shows etc...), originally self-released in 2006. After gaining national exposure due to radio play on Seattle-based independent radio station, KEXP, the band signed to local label Light In The Attic. On their new record label, The Blakes LP was remastered and re-released with new album cover art and two additional tracks, "Magoo" and "Run".

== Track listing ==
=== 2006 self-release ===
1. "Two Times" - 2:40
2. "Don't Bother Me" - 2:50
3. "Modern Man" - 2:37
4. "Commit" - 2:36
5. "Don't Want That Now" - 2:20
6. "Vampire" - 2:43
7. "Lint Walk" - 2:50
8. "Lie Next To Me" - 2:47
9. "Pistol Grip" - 2:03
10. "Picture" - 2:35
11. "Streets" - 3:51

=== 2007 re-release ===
1. "Two Times" - 2:40
2. "Don't Bother Me" - 2:50
3. "Magoo" - 1:57
4. "Modern Man" - 2:37
5. "Run" - 2:57
6. "Commit" - 2:36
7. "Don't Want That Now" - 2:20
8. "Lint Walk" - 2:50
9. "Vampire" - 2:43
10. "Lie Next To Me" - 2:47
11. "Pistol Grip" - 2:03
12. "Picture" - 2:35
13. "Streets" - 3:51

=== Bonus tracks ===
14. "Looking For Love Again" (iTunes release) - 2:36
15. "Wrong Side" (iTunes release) - 2:46

=== Videos ===
- "Don't Bother Me" Director: Travis Senger; Producer: Michael J. Mouncer; Cinematographer: Sean Porter
- "Don't Want That Now" Director: unknown; Producer: unknown; Cinematographer: unknown

== Personnel ==
- Garnet Keim – vocals, guitar
- Snow Keim – vocals, bass
- Bob Husak – drums
