= Valentina Giovagnini =

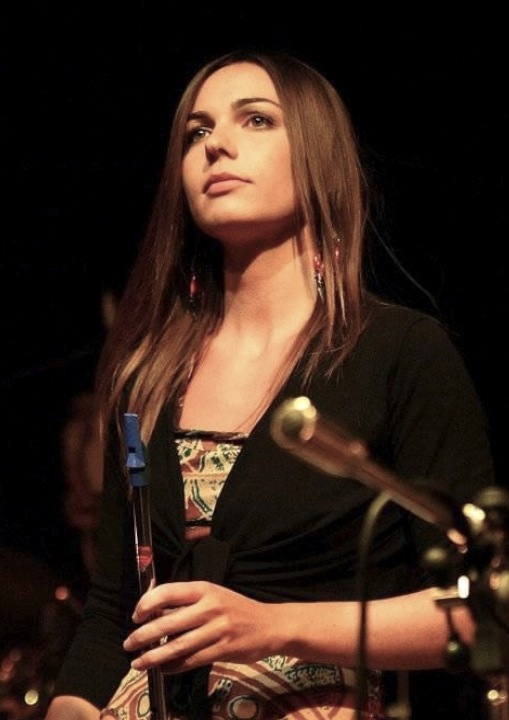
- Valentina Giovagnini

Background information
- Born: 6 April 1980
- Origin: Arezzo, Italy
- Died: 2 January 2009 (aged 28)
- Genres: Pop, Celtic
- Occupation: Singer
- Instruments: Vocals, whistle, uilleann pipes
- Years active: 2001–09
- Labels: Virgin Records, Edel Music
- Website: www.valentinagiovagnini.it (in Italian)

Valentina Giovagnini (6 April 1980 – 2 January 2009) was an Italian pop singer, active between 2001 and 2009. She was born in Arezzo, Italy.

She made her first appearance at the Sanremo Music Festival (Youth Section) in 2002, coming second with the song "Il passo silenzioso della neve" (The Quiet Step of the Snow).

Her first solo album, Creatura nuda (Nude Creature), uses unusual typical Celtic instruments: whistle, musette de cour, uilleann pipes and others. It was released in March 2002.

She died at the age of 28 in Siena, Italy, of injuries sustained in a car accident.

A second posthumous record entitled "L'amore non ha fine" (Love Has No End), containing songs recorded from 2003 to 2008, and never before released, including the title-track of this record L'amore non ha fine, was released in May 2009.

== Discography ==
=== Albums ===
Title	Release date	Notes	Label
Creatura nuda	15 March 2002	first studio album	Virgin
L'amore non ha fine	15 May 2009	posthumous album	Edel Music

=== Singles ===
- "Dovevo dire di no (il traffico dei sensi)" (2001)
- "Il passo silenzioso della neve / Dovevo dire di no (il traffico dei sensi) / Accarezzando a piedi nudi le colline di Donegal / Il passo silenzioso della neve (base)" (2002)
- "Senza origine" (Promo Radio, 2002)
- "Creatura nuda" (Promo Radio 2002)
- "Non piango più / Voglio quello che sento / Non piango più (instrumental)" (2003)
- "L'amore non ha fine" (Promo Radio, 2009)
