= The Blakes =

American indie rock band from Seattle

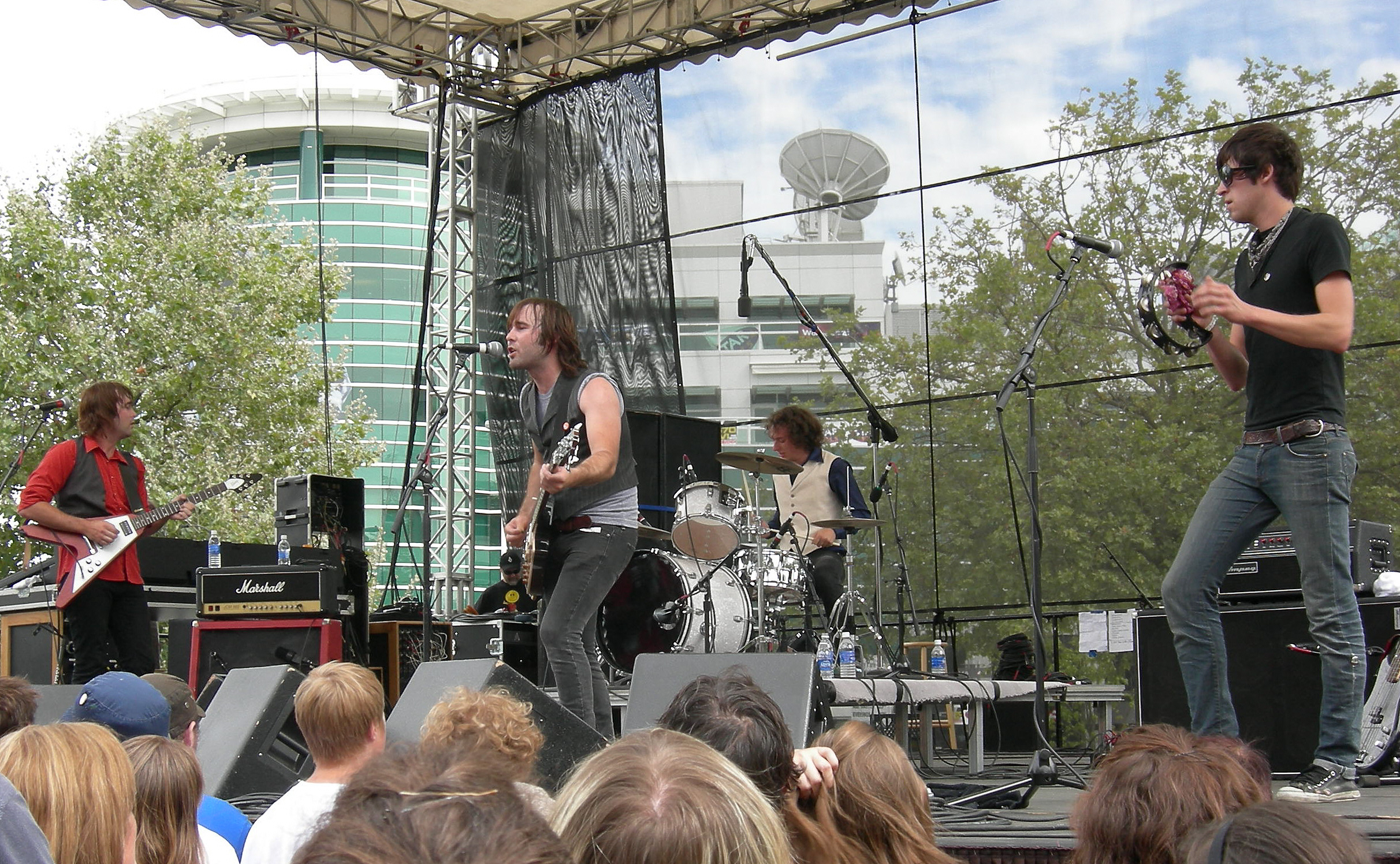
- The Blakes in 2007

Background information
- Origin: Seattle, Washington, United States
- Genres: Indie rock
- Instruments: Vocals, Guitars, Bass, Drums
- Years active: 2001 – present
- Labels: Light In The Attic
- Members: Garnet Keim; Snow Keim; Bob Husak
- Website: Official Site; Official MySpace page

The Blakes are an American indie rock band from Seattle, Washington. The band had several independent releases before signing to Seattle record label Light In The Attic, and then had two more studio releases: The Blakes LP and Streets EP. After that they had two more independent releases in 2009: Lights On EP and Souvenir LP.

== Overview ==
Prior to the band's conception, brothers Garnet and Snow Keim had busked around the country writing music in the late 1990s, ultimately leading them to Seattle, Washington. The band formed in 2001 when the Keim brothers met their future drummer, Bob Husak, in a local Seattle coffeehouse (Tully's). Named after a dream that bassist Snow Keim experienced involving an encounter with 18th-century English poet William Blake in a metal shop, The Blakes moved to Los Angeles and began their musical career, playing shows and living for nearly two years in a Days Inn Hotel. The band put out a string of self-released EPs and eventually moved back to Seattle. In 2005, The Blakes gained major exposure from their fourth release, Little Whispers, when Seattle radio station KEXP began playing and promoting their music. In 2006, the band released their self-titled LP and toured extensively. In the following year, the band signed to Seattle independent record label Light In the Attic. In 2007, on their new label, the band released the Streets EP, and later remixed (Martin Feveyear) remastered and reissued The Blakes LP. 2007 and 2008 found the band touring internationally playing such prestigious venues as Le Bataclan and L'Olympia as well as international festivals Lollapalooza, Bumbershoot, Sasquatch, Eurockéennes, and more. In 2009, The Blakes released two more independent releases: Lights On EP (a limited run of hand silk screened cd's in jackets) andSouvenir LP composed of 17 songs quickly drew the attention of KEXP and received heavy rotation. At this time, the band embarked on a three-month tour of the US. Also in 2009, the Keim Brothers collaborated with producer Brian Brown and created the project BEADS. An acoustic, psychedelic pop record called No One Knows. Much of 2010 was spent in studio, recording what was supposed to be a follow-up to Souvenir. The record was called Low Low, but after completion and a six-week US tour all but two songs were scrapped by the band: "Surf's Up" and "Sea Fishing". 2011 brought yet another BEADS record Thin Air the band's most extensive exploration of musical composition to date. Also, during this time the band signed a worldwide publishing contract with Memory Lane Music Group. The summer of 2011, the band again went into the studio writing, recording and producing for what will be The Blakes' "Art of Losses" LP, due out July 24, 2012.

== Personnel ==
- Garnet Keim – vocals, guitar
- Snow Keim – vocals, bass
- Bob Husak – drums

== Trivia ==
The song "Commit" was featured on an episode of the third season How I Met Your Mother, Little Boys.

The Blakes appear in the film True Adolescents. In the film they are called The Effort and play the songs Streets and Circuits (which is an outtake from the Lights In the Attic release).

The song "Don't Bother Me" was featured on an episode of Beverly Hills, 90210. The song "Modern MAN" was featured in the feature film Meet Bill 2007.

== Discography ==
=== Albums and EPs ===
- The Blakes LP - Self-released (2001)
- Marine Sailor LP - Self-released (2003)
- The Bottle EP - Self-released (2004)
- Little Whispers EP - Self-released (2005)
- The Blakes LP - Self-released (2006)
- Streets EP - Light In The Attic (2007)
- The Blakes LP - Light In The Attic (2007)
- Beads - No One Knows LP - Self-released (2009)
- Lights On EP - Self-released (2009)
- Souvenir LP - Self-released (2009)
- Beads - Thin Air LP - Self-released (2010)
- Art of Losses LP - Self-released (2012)
- Junko LP - Self-released (2013)
- A Darker Green LP - Self-released (2014)
- What Came After Us EP - Self-released (2023)

=== Singles ===
- "Two Times" - Light In The Attic (2007) UK only
- "Don't Want That Now" - Light In The Attic (2008) UK only
- "Evil" -Beads - Everybody's Stalking(2010) UK only

=== Compilations ===
- "The Upside - Small Town Vampires" - The Upside (2005)
- "Sound Of Color" - Gap and Rehab (2008)
- "Give" - Give Seattle (2009)

=== Demos ===
- "The Blakes Demos Vol. 1" - MySpace (2006 and 2007)
- "The Blakes Cereal Box Demos" - MySpace (2009)

=== Live ===
- Live At The Vera EP - Light In The Attic (2007)
- Live Session (iTunes Exclusive) EP - iTunes (2008)
