= We Are One: The Obama Inaugural Celebration at the Lincoln Memorial =

January 18, 2009 concert

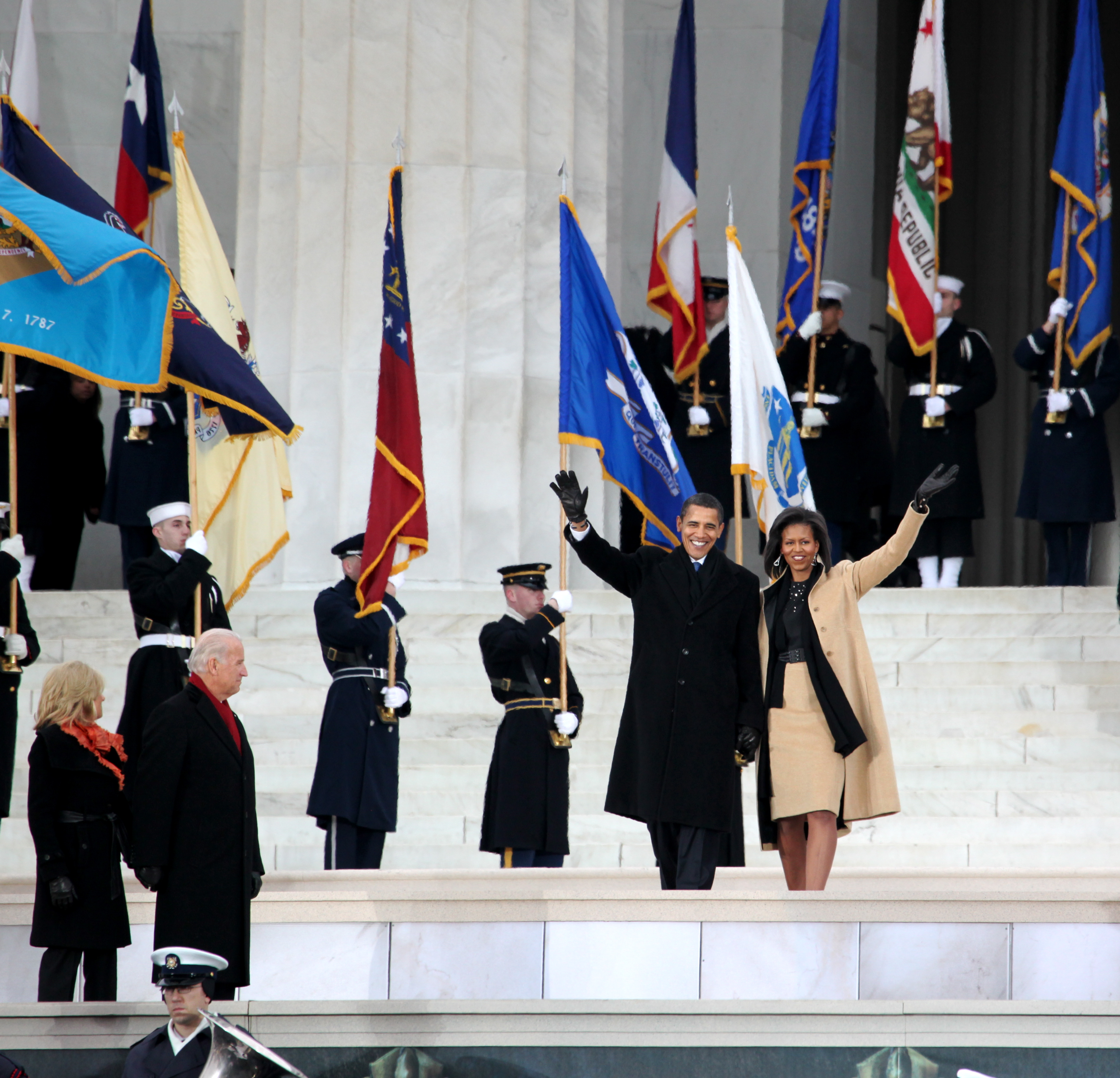
Barack Obama and Michelle Obama at the We Are One concert event

We Are One: The Obama Inaugural Celebration at the Lincoln Memorial was a public celebration of the then forthcoming inauguration of Barack Obama as the 44th president of the United States at the Lincoln Memorial and the National Mall in Washington, D.C., on January 18, 2009. By some estimates the attendance was over 400,000.

The event was produced by George Stevens and Don Mischer and directed by Mischer. Rob Mathes of the Kennedy Center Honors served as musical director. A backing band used by many of the artists was in the orchestra pit, and featured veteran session drummer Kenny Aronoff.

The concert featured performances by (in alphabetical order) Beyoncé, Mary J. Blige, Jon Bon Jovi, Garth Brooks, Mariah Carey, Sheryl Crow, Renée Fleming, Caleb Green, Josh Groban, Herbie Hancock, Heather Headley, Bettye LaVette, John Legend, John Mellencamp, Jennifer Nettles, Pete Seeger, Shakira, Bruce Springsteen, James Taylor, U2, Usher, will.i.am and Stevie Wonder. Several of the songs performed had been used by Obama's presidential campaign.

The concert also featured readings of historical passages by Jack Black, Steve Carell, Rosario Dawson, Jamie Foxx, Tom Hanks, Samuel L. Jackson, Ashley Judd, Martin Luther King III, Queen Latifah, Laura Linney, George Lopez, Kal Penn, Marisa Tomei, Denzel Washington, Forest Whitaker and Tiger Woods.

== Lineup ==
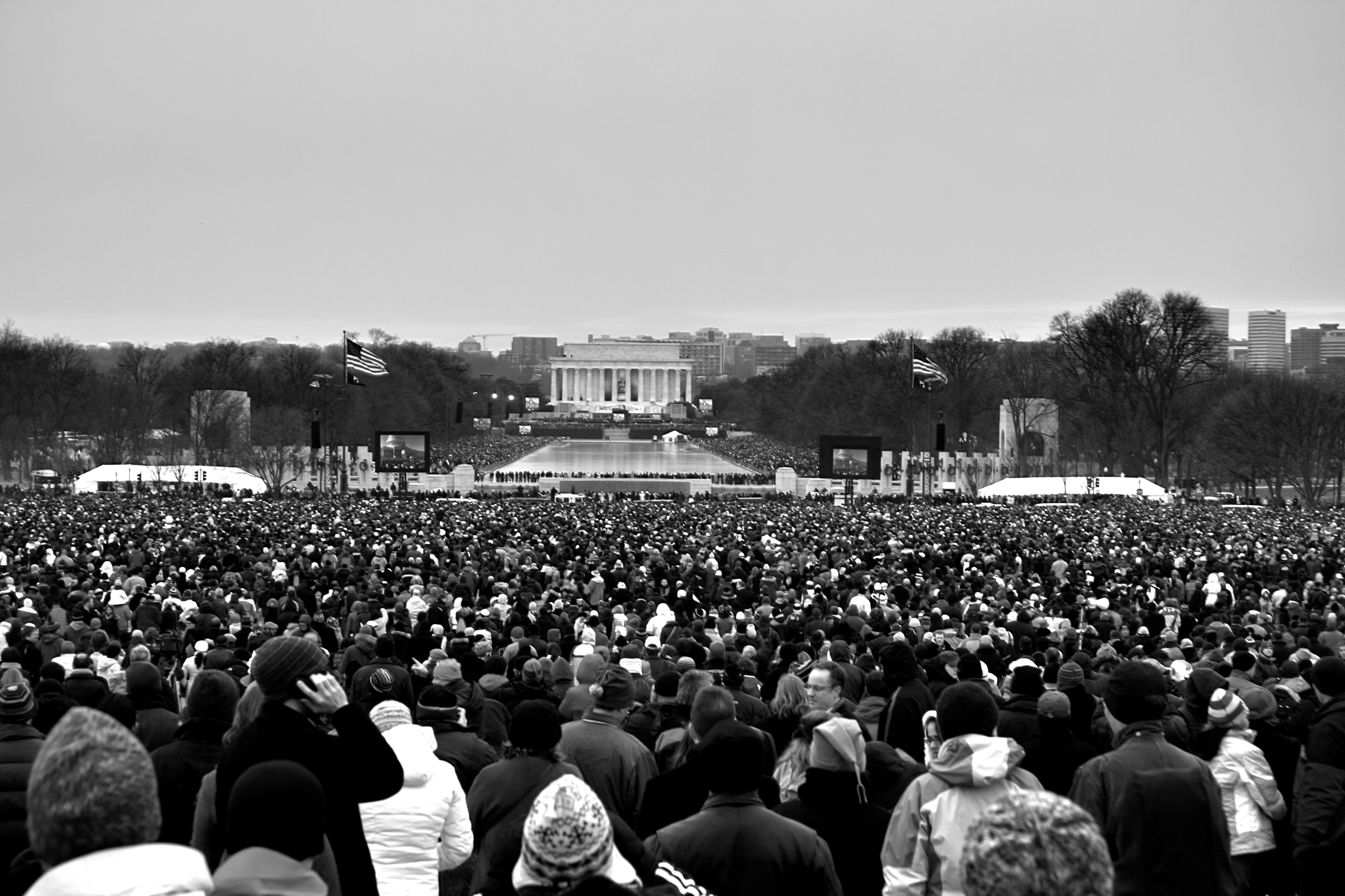
An estimated 400,000 people attended the event.

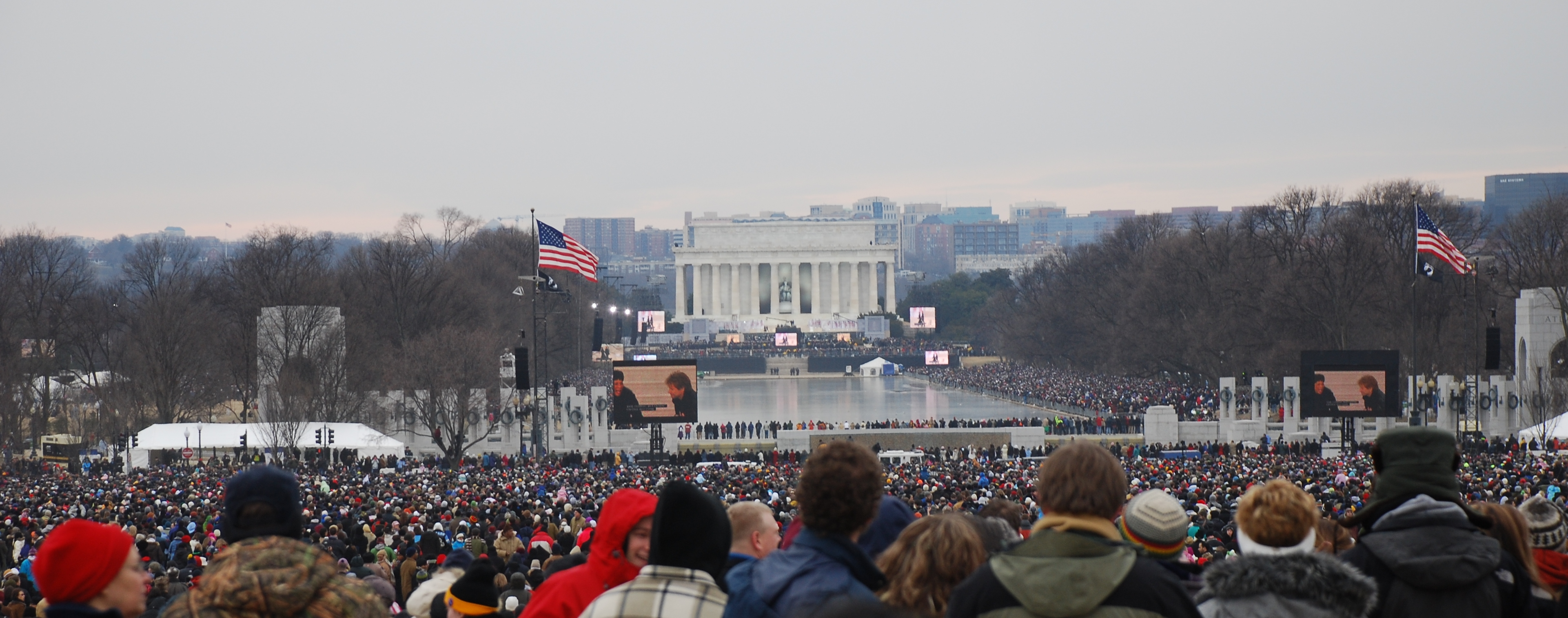

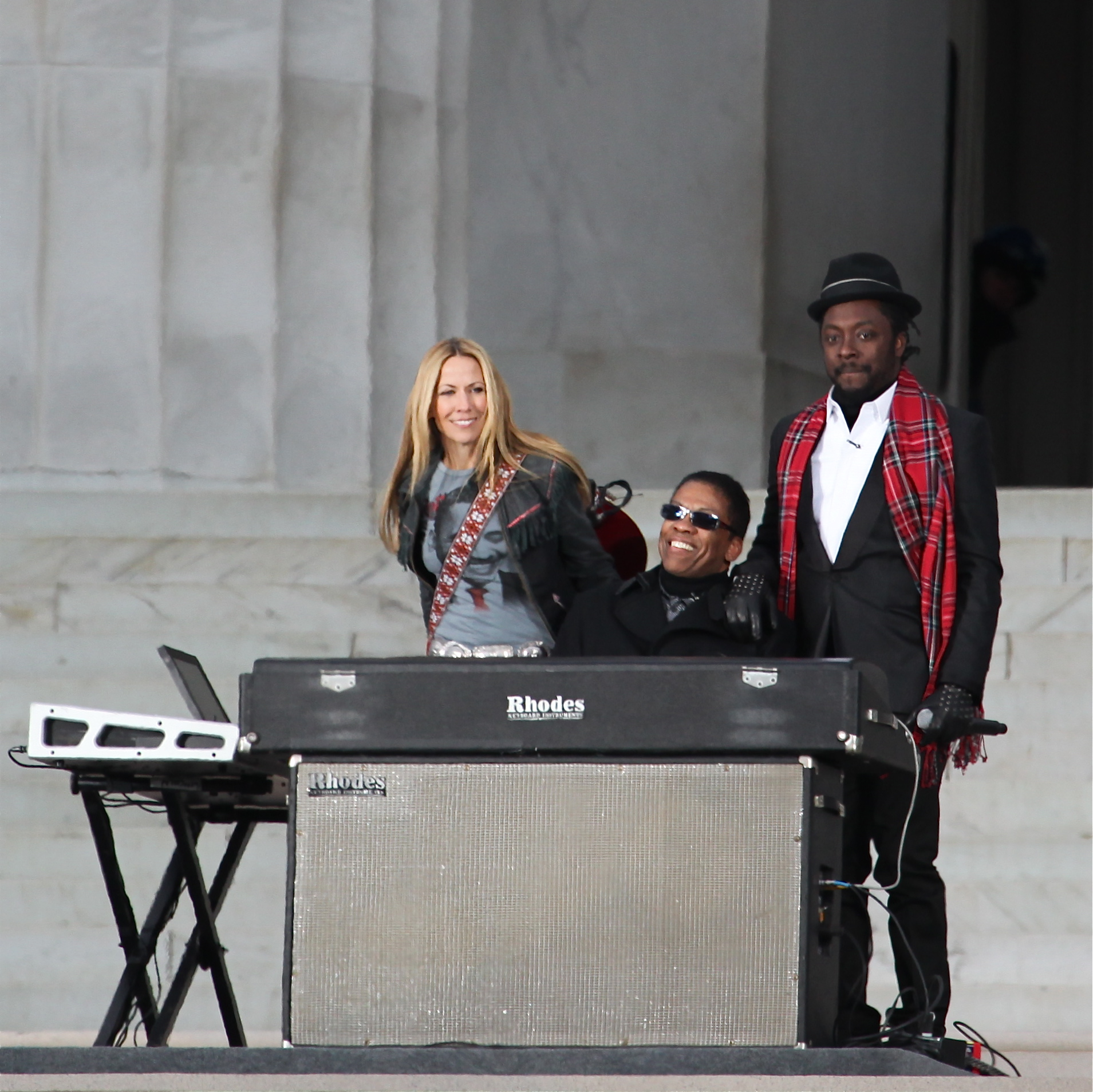
Sheryl Crow, Herbie Hancock, and will.i.am

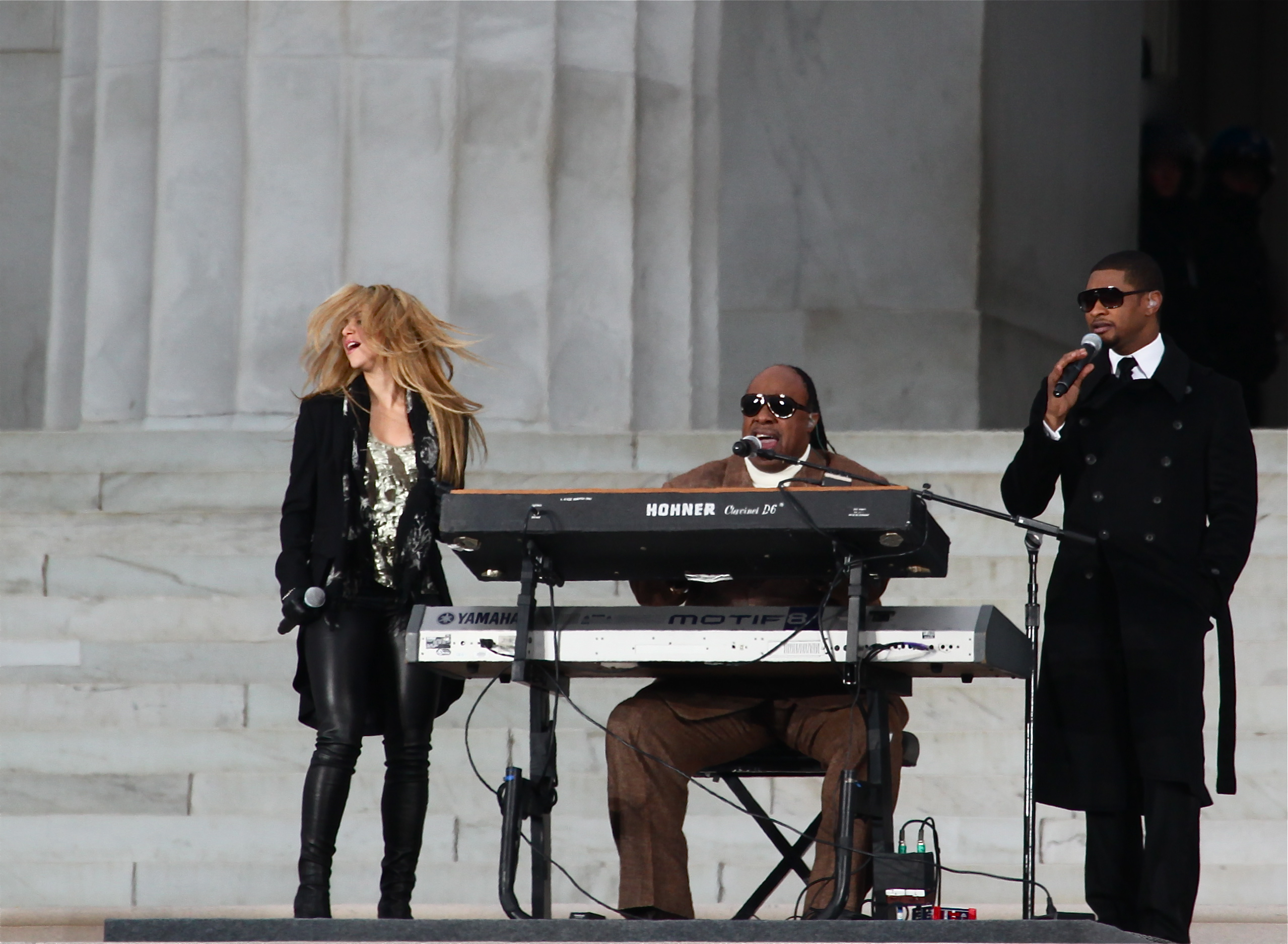
Shakira, Stevie Wonder, and Usher

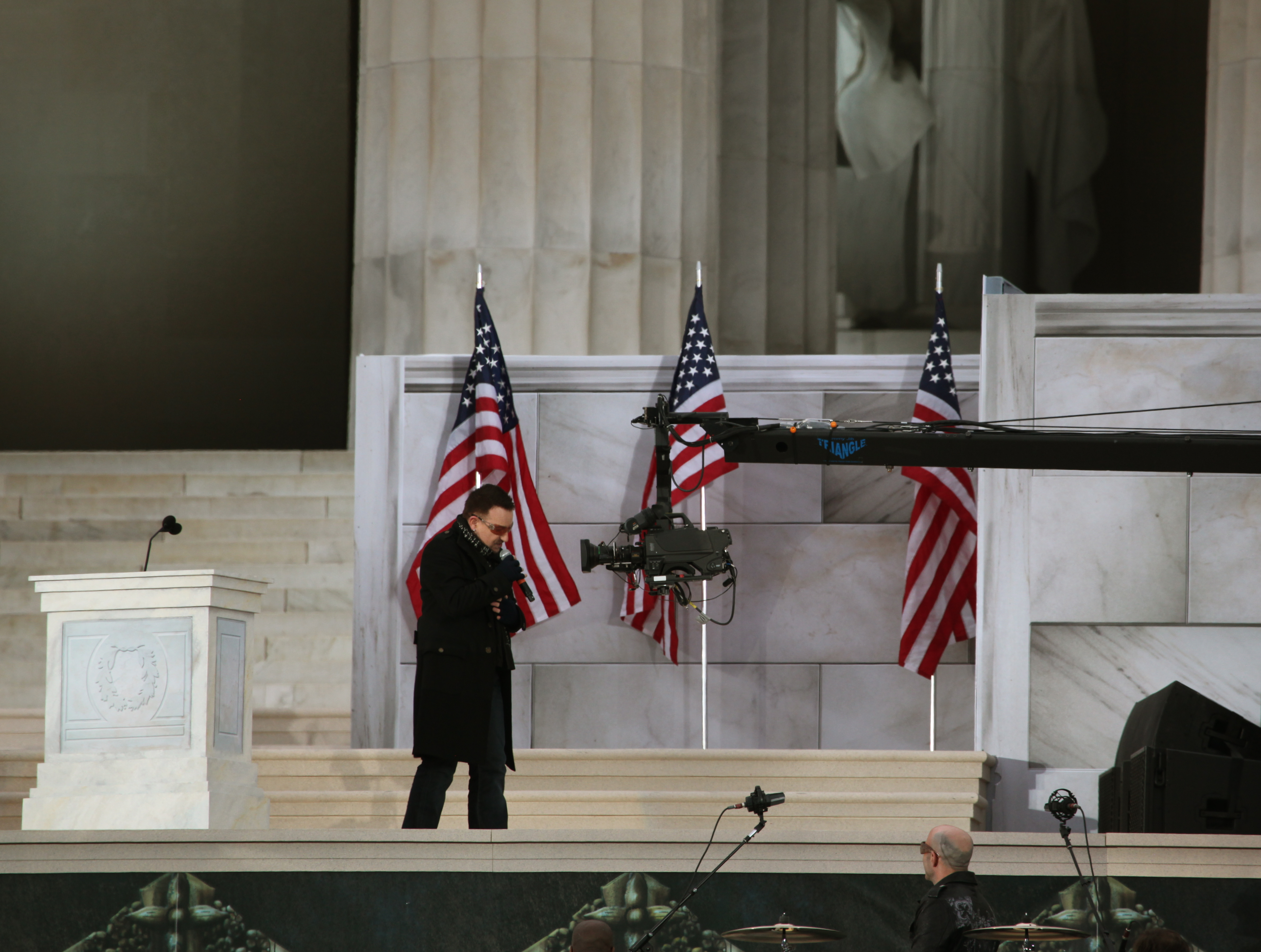
Bono of U2

Episcopal Bishop of New Hampshire Gene Robinson gave an open prayer to start the celebration.

Performer(s) / Speaker(s)	Act
The US Army Band "Pershing's Own" Herald Trumpets	"Fanfare for the Common Man" by Aaron Copland
Joint Service Color guard, led by the Army Continental Color Guard (CCG), Master Sergeant Caleb B. Green III	"The Star-Spangled Banner" by Francis Scott Key and John Stafford Smith
Denzel Washington	Homage to leaders given Monuments or Memorials
Bruce Springsteen and The Joyce Garrett Singers	"The Rising" by Bruce Springsteen
Laura Linney and Martin Luther King III	Passages by Franklin D. Roosevelt and John F. Kennedy
Mary J. Blige	"Lean on Me" by Bill Withers
Jamie Foxx and Steve Carell	Referencing Thomas Jefferson, Thurgood Marshall, and Robert F. Kennedy
Bettye LaVette and Jon Bon Jovi	"A Change Is Gonna Come" by Sam Cooke
Tom Hanks	Lincoln Portrait by Aaron Copland
Marisa Tomei	Quoting Ronald Reagan
James Taylor, John Legend, Jennifer Nettles, Arnold McCuller, Caroline (Kim) Taylor	"Shower the People" by James Taylor
Joe Biden	Speech: The Dignity of Work
John Mellencamp and Baptist choir	"Pink Houses" by John Mellencamp
Queen Latifah	Referencing Marian Anderson
Josh Groban, Heather Headley, and the Gay Men's Chorus of Washington, D.C.	"My Country, 'Tis of Thee" by Samuel Francis Smith
George Lopez and Kal Penn	Quotes from Dwight D. Eisenhower and Barbara Jordan
Herbie Hancock, will.i.am, and Sheryl Crow	"One Love" by Bob Marley
Tiger Woods	Dedicating the Armed Forces
Renée Fleming and the U.S. Naval Academy Glee Club	"You'll Never Walk Alone" from Rodgers and Hammerstein's Carousel
Jack Black and Rosario Dawson	Tribute to Theodore Roosevelt
Garth Brooks and Inaugural Celebration Chorus	"American Pie" by Don McLean, "Shout" by The Isley Brothers, "We Shall Be Free" by Garth Brooks
Ashley Judd and Forest Whitaker	Referencing John F. Kennedy and William Faulkner
Usher, Stevie Wonder, and Shakira	"Higher Ground" by Stevie Wonder
Samuel L. Jackson	Referencing Abraham Lincoln, Rosa Parks, and Martin Luther King Jr.
U2	"Pride (In the Name of Love)" and "City of Blinding Lights"
Barack Obama	Speech: Voices Calling for Change
Pete Seeger, Bruce Springsteen, Tao Rodríguez-Seeger, and Inaugural Celebration Chorus	"This Land Is Your Land" by Woody Guthrie
Beyoncé and entire ensemble	"America the Beautiful" by Katharine Lee Bates and Samuel A. Ward

== Broadcast ==
Attendance at the concert was free to the public, and HBO also broadcast the concert for free on cable television services on their usually subscription-only network. The concert was broadcast around the world. In Finland it was broadcast live and free to air by YLE TV1. In the Netherlands it was broadcast live and free by Nederland 3. It was broadcast in Portugal by RTP 2 on January 24, 2009. In Sweden it was broadcast by TV8. HBO released the concert as part of a 2 DVD set (including the Inaugural Address and Neighborhood Ball) in April 2010. Also, it was shown for the crowd at Obama's inauguration two days later on megascreens in the hours before the ceremony began.

== Reception ==
The Associated Press called it a "near-flawless production with multiple camera angles and a majestic backdrop in the giant statue of Abraham Lincoln".
