= Talking Through Tin Cans =

Studio album by The Morning Benders
- Released: May 6, 2008
- Genre: Indie pop
- Label: +1 Records

The Morning Benders chronology
Talking Through Tin Cans (2008)	Big Echo (2010)

Professional ratings
Review scores
Source	Rating
AbsolutePunk	(74%) link
Allmusic	link
Popmatters	link
Slant Magazine	link

Talking Through Tin Cans is the first studio album by Berkeley, California-based indie pop band The Morning Benders, currently known as POP ETC. It was released in 2008 on +1 Records.

It was named best indie/alternative album of 2008 by iTunes.

== Track listing ==
1. "Damnit Anna" – 1:58
2. "I Was Wrong" – 3:19
3. "Loose Change" – 3:02
4. "Patient Patient" – 2:32
5. "Crosseyed" – 2:47
6. "Waiting for a War" – 2:38
7. "Heavy Hearts" – 3:51
8. "Boarded Doors" – 3:27
9. "Wasted Time" – 3:25
10. "Chasing a Ghost" – 3:53
11. "When We're Apart" – 1:31
