= Waters (band) =

Musical group

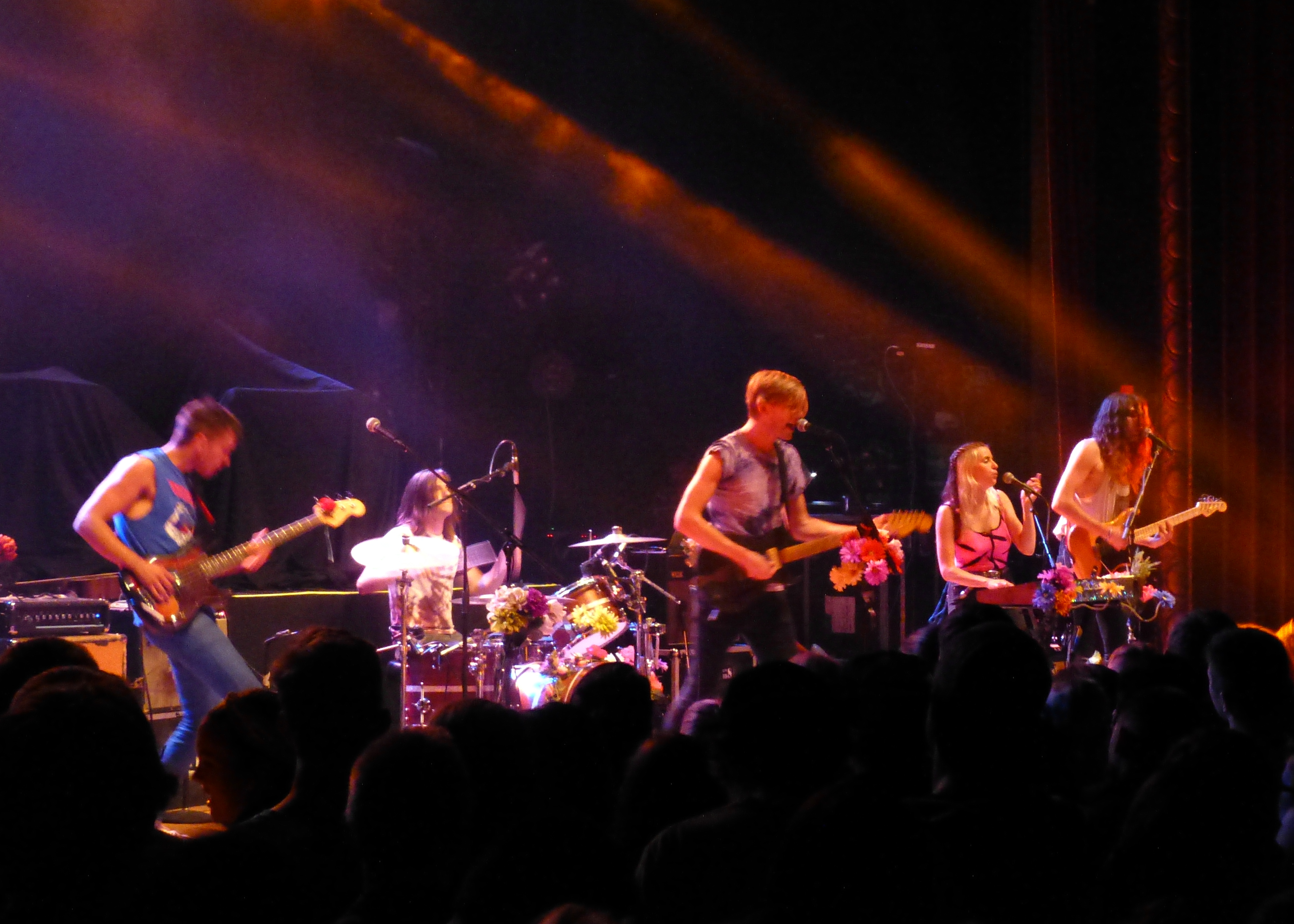
- Waters performing at the Royal Oak Music Theatre in 2015

Background information
- Origin: California, United States
- Genres: Rock
- Years active: 2011-present
- Labels: Vagrant Records, TBD Records
- Members: Van Pierszalowski; Brian DaMert; Greg Sellin; Andrew Wales; Sara DaMert

Waters (stylized as WATERS) is a musical project formed by Van Pierszalowski, the frontman of Port O'Brien, after Port O'Brien broke up. Pierszalowski traveled to Oslo to work on the album. The group released their debut album, Out in the Light, in 2011 to generally favorable reviews. The band consists of Van Pierszalowski (vocals/guitar), Brian DaMert (guitar), Greg Sellin (bass), Andrew Wales (drums), and Sara DaMert (keyboard).

== History ==
Waters was formed in 2011 in Oslo, Norway by Van Pierszalowski. He put together a band to record their first record "Out in the Light" with John Congleton in Dallas. The record was released by TBD Records. New York City NPR affiliate WFUV featured the band on their Alternate Side program. The band was also featured in a NYLON Magazine Band Crush feature.

After finishing school and coming off of years on the road supporting former music projects, Van Pierszalowski decided to live and work in San Francisco, allowing himself to stand still for the first time in ages. The calm gave way to creative restlessness and the result was a new band and a new sound in the form of Waters. Earlier in the year the band released the single “Got To My Head” which was hailed a “big high five of a song” by Stereogum and a song with “enough youthful sizzle to make fans eager for new music” by BuzzbandsLA.

In 2014, they released their follow-up EP called It All Might Be Ok which was produced by Ryan Rabin of Grouplove. In October 2014 they were named one of the 10 New Artists You Need to Know by Rolling Stone. NPR affiliate KCRW also featured Waters on their program Morning Becomes Eclectic. A video was released for their single "I Feel Everything" and premiered on Billboard (magazine). They toured to promote the EP with Tegan & Sara, Smallpools, and Magic Man.

In 2015, they released their second full-length album What's Real through Vagrant Records. Two years later, the band released their third full-length album Something More! on May 19, 2017 through Vagrant Records.

== Band members ==
- Van Williams (Previously Van Pierszalowski) (vocals, guitar)
- Brian DaMert (guitar)
- Greg Sellin (bass)
- Andrew Wales (drums)
- Sarah Haluska (keys)

== Touring ==
From October 14 to November 21, 2014 they toured with Magic Man and Smallpools. From November 11 to November 18, 2014 they toured on The Lets Make Things Physical Tour with Tegan and Sara, Cold War Kids and Smallpools. Waters has previously toured with Nada Surf, Wye Oak, Delta Spirit, Clap Your Hands Say Yeah, Mister Heavenly, Male Bonding, and Vetiver.

From April 11 to May 20, 2015 they toured with Matt and Kim. From September 23 to November 8, 2015 they toured with MisterWives.

== Discography ==
=== Studio albums ===
- Out in the Light (2011)
- What's Real (2015)
- Something More! (2017)

=== EPs ===
- It All Might Be OK (2014, Vagrant Records)

=== Singles ===
- "For the One"
- "If Only" (2012)
- "I Feel Everything" (2014)
- "Hiccups" (2017)
