= Van William =

American musician (born 1984)

Van William (also known as Van Pierszalowski) is an American musician. He formed the band Waters, serving as a vocalist and guitarist, and was the frontman of the band Port O'Brien. He is currently a solo artist.

Van William was born on November 24, 1984, in Cambria, San Luis Obispo, California, US as Van William Pierszalowski. He is a California native but has lived in Norway, Alaska and New York. While living in Alaska every summer growing up, Van worked on his father's commercial salmon fishing boat, the Shawnee, on Kodiak Island. Van has cited Neil Young, Kurt Cobain, and Lily Allen as his musical heroes.

On July 18, 2017, NPR premiered the music video for "Revolution", featuring the Swedish folk group First Aid Kit. This also served as the announcement for the release of The Revolution EP, Van's solo debut, in September. In January 2018, the song "Revolution" reached number 6 on the Billboard Adult Alternative Songs chart. His first full-length album, Countries, was released on January 19, 2018. Following the release of Countries, Van William performed with First Aid Kit during their 2018 world tour for their album Ruins.

== Discography ==
- The Revolution EP (2017)
- Countries (2018)
- "When They Burn" (2018), single
