= Big Echo =

Studio album by The Morning Benders
- Released: 9 March 2010
- Genre: Indie pop, baroque pop
- Length: 38:53
- Label: Beggars/Rough Trade
- Producer: Chris Taylor

The Morning Benders chronology
Talking Through Tin Cans (2008)	Big Echo (2010)

Professional ratings
Aggregate scores
Source	Rating
Metacritic	(72/100)
Review scores
Source	Rating
Allmusic	link
BBC	(mixed) link
Drowned in Sound	link
One Thirty BPM	(87%) link
Pitchfork Media	(8.2/10) link
Popmatters	link
Slant Magazine	link
sputnikmusic	link

Big Echo is the second studio album released by The Morning Benders, currently known as POP ETC, in 2010. It was co-produced by Grizzly Bear bassist Chris Taylor.

== Track listing ==
1. "Excuses" – 5:17
2. "Promises" – 3:03
3. "Wet Cement" – 3:55
4. "Cold War (Nice Clean Fight)" – 1:44
5. "Pleasure Sighs" – 4:28
6. "Hand Me Downs" – 3:45
7. "Mason Jar" – 4:45
8. "All Day Day Light" – 3:38
9. "Stitches" – 5:04
10. "Sleeping In" – 3:14
