= Caleb Green (singer) =

American singer

Caleb B. Green III
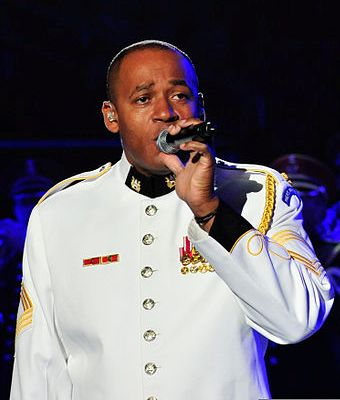
- MSG Green performing in the Army Spirit of America show at the Greensboro Coliseum in 2012
- Born: September 8, 1964 (age 62); Hampton, Virginia
- Military career
- Allegiance: United States of America
- Branch: United States Army
- Service years: 1985–present
- Rank: Master Sergeant
- Unit: United States Army Band

Master Sergeant Caleb Bernard Green III (born September 8, 1964) is an American solo vocalist with the United States Army Band. An accomplished performer, particularly of the US national anthem, Green is often called upon to sing at important sporting events, diplomatic functions and military ceremonies. Green and former military member, Bob McDonald are the primary national anthem singers for the Washington Capitals. His most notable anthem performance was at the 2009 "We Are One" presidential inauguration concert at the Lincoln Memorial in Washington, D.C. Prior to this his most notable outing was onstage in the TNT production "Christmas in Washington 2008", in which he sang "O Holy Night". He is also a member of Voices of Service, an acappella group formed by him and three other military members to provide music therapy to ex-military with posttraumatic stress disorder (PTSD). Currently the group is into the semifinals of America's Got Talent, season 14 for a shot to win one million dollars and to headline a Las Vegas show.
