= Leon Kirchner =

American composer

- Born: January 24, 1919; New York City, U.S.
- Died: September 17, 2009 (aged 90); New York City, U.S.
- Occupation: Composer
- Spouse: Gertrude Schoenberg (1949–1999)
- Children: 2

Leon Kirchner (January 24, 1919 – September 17, 2009) was an American composer of contemporary classical music. He was a member of the American Academy of Arts and Letters and the American Academy of Arts and Sciences, and he won a Pulitzer Prize for his String Quartet No. 3.

== Life and career ==
Kirchner was born in Brooklyn, New York. He began his music studies at the age of four. Five years later, his family moved to Los Angeles. He began composing while a student at Los Angeles City College. With the encouragement of his piano teachers and Ernst Toch, he entered the University of California, Los Angeles to study with Arnold Schoenberg. Kirchner began graduate studies at the University of California, Berkeley and was awarded the George Ladd Prix de Paris in 1942. As World War II put Europe in turmoil, he went to New York and studied with Roger Sessions. At the war's end, he returned to Berkeley as a lecturer and assisted Sessions and Ernest Bloch in theory.

Kirchner held a Slee Professiorship at the University of Buffalo (succeeding Aaron Copland), and professorships at the University of California, University of Southern California, Yale University, the Juilliard School of Music, and Mills College, where he was the first Luther Brusie Marchant Professor from 1954 to 1961. In 1961 he moved to Harvard University, where in 1966 he succeeded Walter Piston as Walter Bigelow Rosen Professor of Music and taught until 1989. He won the Pulitzer Prize for Music in 1967 for his Quartet No. 3.

According to Alexander Ringer, he "remained consistently individual, unimpressed by changing fashion where 'idea, the precious ore of art, is lost in the jungle of graphs, prepared tapes, feedbacks and cold stylistic minutiae'."

Kirchner married Gertrude Schoenberg, a singer and student of Arnold Schoenberg (no relation), on July 8, 1949; they had one son and one daughter. In 2009 he died of congestive heart failure at his home on Central Park West in New York City. He was 90.
