= Grizzly Bear discography =

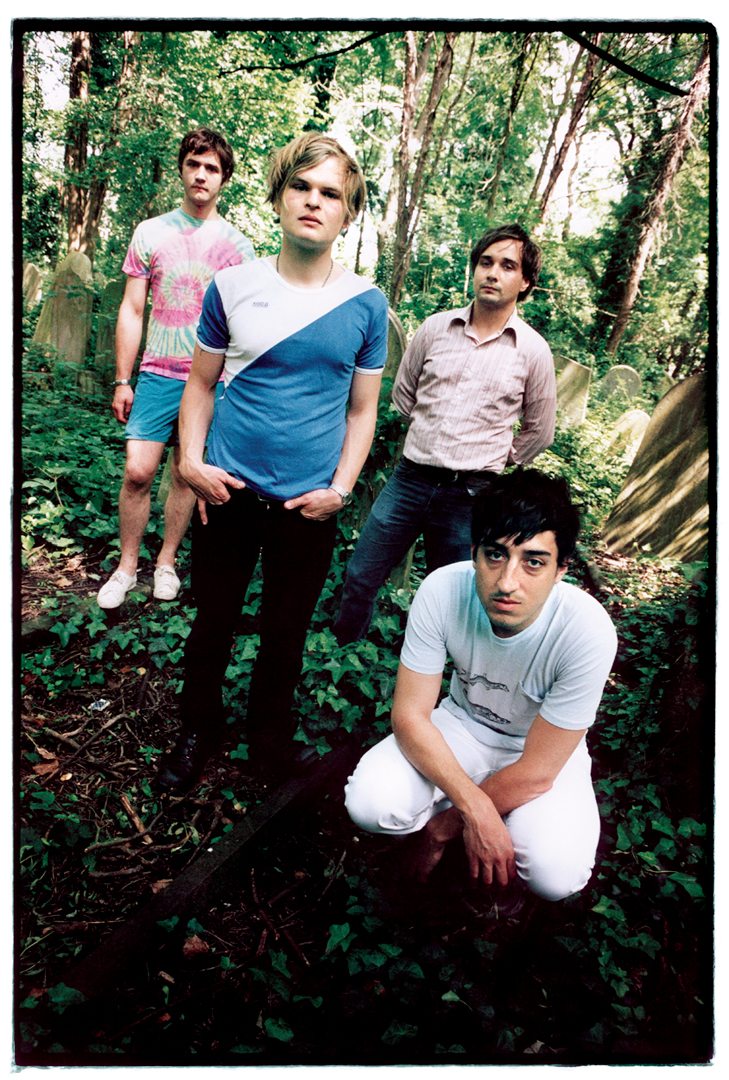
- Grizzly Bear in 2006
- Studio albums: 5
- EPs: 5
- Singles: 8

The discography of Grizzly Bear includes five studio albums, five extended plays and eight singles. Grizzly Bear is an American alternative rock band that was formed in 2002 by Ed Droste. After the band's first studio album was released, Droste was joined by drummer Christopher Bear, bass guitarist and producer Chris Taylor, and guitarist Daniel Rossen.

== Studio albums ==
List of studio albums, with selected chart positions and certifications
Title	Album details	Peak chart positions										Certifications
Title	Album details	US	AUS	BEL (FL)	BEL (WA)	CAN	GER	IRL	NLD	SWI	UK	Certifications
Horn of Plenty	Released: November 9, 2004; Label: Kanine; Format: CD, vinyl, digital	—	—	—	—	—	—	—	—	—	— (Note: Horn of Plenty did not enter the UK Albums chart, but peaked at 87 on the UK Physical Singles Sales chart.)	
Yellow House	Released: September 5, 2006; Label: Warp; Format: CD, vinyl, digital	—	—	—	—	—	—	—	—	—	—	
Veckatimest	Released: May 26, 2009; Label: Warp; Format: CD, vinyl, digital	8	41	20	34	—	99	13	49	96	24	BPI: Silver
Shields	Released: September 18, 2012; Label: Warp; Format: CD, vinyl, digital	7	17	13	25	16	40	14	35	29	17	
Painted Ruins	Released: August 18, 2017; Label: RCA; Format: CD, vinyl, digital	27	26	18	32	31	27	6	13	16	14	
"—" denotes a release that did not chart.

== Extended plays ==
Title	EP details	Peak chart positions	
Title	EP details	US Heat	UK Sales
Horn of Plenty: The Remixes	Released: November 8, 2005; Label: Kanine; Format: Digital	—	—
Sorry for the Delay	Released: April 10, 2006; Label: Audraglint; Formats: Digital, Vinyl	—	—
Friend	Released: November 5, 2007; Label: Warp; Format: Digital	7	—
Brian Eno X Nicolas Jaar X Grizzly Bear	Released: April 20, 2013; Label: Warp; Format: Vinyl	—	36
Shields: B-Sides	Released: November 12, 2013; Label: Warp; Format: Digital, Vinyl	—	—
"—" denotes a release that did not chart.

== Singles ==
List of singles, with selected chart positions, showing year released, certifications and album name
Title	Year	Peak chart positions								Certifications	Album
Title	Year	US Sales	US AAA	US Dance	BEL (FL)	BEL (WA)	MEX	UK Sales	UK Indie	Certifications	Album
"On a Neck, On a Spit"	2006	—	—	—	—	—	—	—	—		Yellow House
"Knife"	2007	—	—	—	—	—	—	—	28		Yellow House
"Two Weeks"	2009	25	—	8	—	76	14	74	15	BPI: Silver	Veckatimest
"While You Wait for the Others"	2009	—	—	—	—	—	—	69	—		Veckatimest
"Cheerleader"	2009	—	—	—	—	—	—	—	—		Veckatimest
"Sleeping Ute"	2012	14	—	1	—	—	—	—	—		Shields
"Yet Again"	2012	—	—	—	117	—	37	—	—		Shields
"A Simple Answer"	2012	—	—	—	—	—	—	—	—		Shields
"Speak in Rounds"	2012	—	—	—	—	—	42	—	—		Shields
"Gun-Shy"	2012	—	—	—	—	—	—	—	—		Shields
"Will Calls"	2013	—	—	—	—	—	—	—	—		Shields
"Three Rings"	2017	—	—	—	—	—	—	—	—		Painted Ruins
"Mourning Sound"	2017	—	15	—	—	—	45	—	—		Painted Ruins
"Four Cypresses"	2017	—	—	—	—	—	—	—	—		Painted Ruins
"Neighbors"	2017	—	—	—	— (Note: "Neighbors" did not enter the Flanders Ultratop Top 50, but charted as an extra tip on the Flanders Ultratop Bubbling Under chart.)	—	—	—	—		Painted Ruins
"Losing All Sense"	2017	—	27	—	—	—	—	—	—		Painted Ruins
"—" denotes a release that did not chart.

== Other releases ==
- "Don't Ask" from Horn of Plenty appeared on a 7" in Tomlab Records' Alphabet Series. It was released on a 7" on November 14, 2005.
- Live from The Central Presbyterian Church, Austin, TX was released on March 19, 2009.
