= Blue Valentine (soundtrack) =

Blue Valentine (Original Motion Picture Soundtrack)

Soundtrack album by Grizzly Bear
- Released: January 25, 2011
- Genre: Pop; jazz; rhythm and blues
- Length: 61:26
- Label: Lakeshore Records
- Producer: Chris Taylor; Daniel Rossen; Christopher Bear; Ed Droste; Eric Craig; Skip Williamson; Brian McNelis; Richard Glasser

Blue Valentine (Original Motion Picture Soundtrack) is the soundtrack to the 2010 film Blue Valentine, released by Lakeshore Records on January 25, 2011, nearly a month after the film's release. It featured original songs composed by Grizzly Bear and the instrumental pieces of the tracks underscored the film.

== Development ==
Initially, Grizzly Bear was intended to write original music, but they could not do so, as they were recruited before the film's Sundance Film Festival premiere. Therefore, the soundtrack consisted of songs from the band's previous studio albums: Yellow House (2006) and Veckatimest (2009), and the extended play Friend (2007). Some of the tracks were later used as instrumental pieces to underscore the film. The soundtrack was highlighted as "one of the important aspects of the film".

Blue Valentine's soundtrack was first announced on January 11 by Lakeshore Records. Apart from Grizzly Bear's contribution to the album, the album featured tracks integral to the film: "You and Me" presented as the couple's personal song. The track was originally recorded as a demo by the band Penny and the Quarters for the obscure Prix Label of Columbus, Ohio in the early 1970s. The track was later re-released on a compilation album by the Numero Group, though the members of the group were not being identified.

The album also featured a rendition of "You Always Hurt the One You Love" which was reworked and performed by the lead actor Ryan Gosling himself. The soundtrack was initially set for release on iTunes and physical CDs on February 1, 2011, before being moved up to a week later.

== Track listing ==
No.	Title	Writer(s)	Artist(s)	Length
1.	"Granny Diner"	Chris Taylor; Daniel Rossen	Grizzly Bear	04:44
2.	"In Ear Park"	Rossen; Fred Nicolaus	Department Of Eagles	04:03
3.	"Easier"	—	(instrumental)	03:40
4.	"Lullabye"	—	(instrumental)	05:19
5.	"I Live With You"	—	(instrumental)	05:09
6.	"Foreground"	—	(instrumental)	03:30
7.	"Dory"	—	(instrumental)	04:26
8.	"You Always Hurt the One You Love"	Allan Roberts; Doris Fisher	Ryan Gosling	01:39
9.	"You and Me"	Penny Johnson	Penny and the Quarters	02:40
10.	"Shift" (Alternate Version)	Ed Droste	Grizzly Bear	03:32
11.	"Alligator" (Choir Version)	Droste	Grizzly Bear; Zach Condon; David Longstreth; Amber Coffman	05:15
12.	"Easier"	Rossen; Droste	Grizzly Bear	03:41
13.	"Lullaby"	Rossen	Grizzly Bear	05:16
14.	"I Live With You"	Christopher Bear; Taylor; Rossen; Droste	Grizzly Bear	04:58
15.	"Foreground"	Bear; Taylor; Rossen; Droste	Grizzly Bear	03:34
Total length:				61:26

== Reception ==
Cynthia Fuchs of PopMatters wrote "The narrative fragmentation is smoothed over by soundtrack cues: songs that bleed over from past to present and vice versa, but the device simultaneously underscores disparities: tenderness turns into bitterness, frustration refracts trust."

Paul Brunick of Slant Magazine felt that the band's music gives the film a "generous score" and continued "the atmospheric but intimate instrumentals, swelling and ebbing from cacophonous clashes of sound to sparkling grace notes and back, perfectly mirrors the story’s range of blow-out battles and delicate minutia." Joe Neumaier of New York Daily News called the musical score as "ethereal". Jonathan Romney of The Independent called it as "mournfully baroque". Calling it as a "pretty, plaintive score", Dana Stevens of Slate opined that "at times it panders to our emotions, especially in the flashback scenes—we would understand that these two were falling in love without acoustic-guitar reinforcement."
