= Mourning Sound (song) =

Single by Grizzly Bear

from the album Painted Ruins
- Released: May 4, 2017
- Length: 4:22
- Label: RCA
- Songwriters: Ed Droste, Daniel Rossen, Chris Taylor, Christopher Bear
- Producer: Chris Taylor

Grizzly Bear singles chronology
"Three Rings" (2017)	"Mourning Sound" (2017)	"Four Cypresses" (2017)

"Mourning Sound" is a song by American indie rock band Grizzly Bear, from their fifth studio album, Painted Ruins. It was released as the second single from the album, along with the announcement of the album on May 17, 2017. Writing of the track is credited to every member of the band, with vocals on the song both by Ed Droste, and Daniel Rossen.

== Writing and composition ==
Ed Droste stated in an interview with NPR that the started with a riff made by Chris Taylor, and that Rossen later added the chorus. The lyrics found in the verse of the song references Droste's divorce from a few years prior to the song. In the same interview with NPR, Droste states, "There's definitely a sense of regret ... but there's also a sense of owning your mistake and taking responsibility for it. I don't want to blame one party in the conflict and know full well much of the strife and turmoil being referenced lays on my back as much as anyone else's."

== Music video ==
A music video was released on YouTube with the release of the single, featuring women dancing around in a mansion, before taking part in a ritual of some sort. The band called the video a "playful, pastel-drenched commentary on women’s liberation.”
