= While You Wait for the Others =

Single by Grizzly Bear

from the album Veckatimest
- B-side: "While You Wait for the Others (feat. Michael McDonald)"
- Released: August 31, 2009
- Length: 4:29
- Label: Warp
- Songwriters: Ed Droste, Daniel Rossen, Chris Taylor and Christopher Bear
- Producer: Chris Taylor

Grizzly Bear singles chronology
"Two Weeks" (2009)	"While You Wait for the Others" (2009)	"Cheerleader" (2009)

"While You Wait for the Others" is a song by Brooklyn-based indie rock band Grizzly Bear, and the second single from the band's third studio album, Veckatimest. The song was released as a single on August 31, 2009.

== Accolades ==
"While You Wait for the Others" was ranked #334 in Pitchfork Media's Top 500 Tracks of the 2000s

Upon release, Pitchfork gave the song their first ever 10/10 review, stating that the track "proves what Grizzly Bear are capable of when they try and meet the pop-inclined listener halfway."

== Michael McDonald collaboration ==
Michael McDonald, of the Doobie Brothers, performs lead vocals on the single's B-side - the same track with the lead vocals replaced by McDonald's. McDonald states that Grizzly Bear's songs are "alluring and interesting. So when they mentioned to me about doing this, I said absolutely."

Speaking to Pitchfork Media about the collaboration, bassist Chris Taylor commented,

My ex-girlfriend's dad was a bass player in that yacht rock scene-- he actually played with Kenny Loggins and the Fleetwood Mac crew. So she asked him, "Do you ever keep in touch with Michael McDonald, dad?" And he said, "Yeah, I talk to him every week!" So we sent Michael the record. He had never heard of us, but he really liked the songs and wanted to be a part of it.

== Video ==
A video for "While You Wait for the Others" was released on September 11, 2009. The video was directed by Sean Pecknold, brother of Fleet Foxes' Robin Pecknold.

== Track listing ==
No.	Title	Length
1.	"While You Wait for the Others"	4:29
2.	"While You Wait for the Others" (featuring Michael McDonald)	4:29
