= Yet Again =

Single by Grizzly Bear

from the album Shields
- Released: August 2, 2012
- Recorded: Marfa, Texas, 2011
- Length: 5:18
- Label: Warp
- Songwriter(s): Ed Droste, Daniel Rossen, Chris Taylor, Christopher Bear
- Producer(s): Chris Taylor

Grizzly Bear singles chronology
"Sleeping Ute" (2012)	"Yet Again" (2012)	"A Simple Answer" (2012)

"Yet Again" is a song by American indie rock band Grizzly Bear, released as the second single from the band's fourth studio album, Shields (2012), on August 2, 2012.

The song features lead vocals from Ed Droste, and is one of two tracks to appear on the album recorded in Marfa, Texas, during the band's initial sessions for Shields.

== Artwork ==
The single's front cover features Untitled #17 by American artist Richard Diebenkorn. Crafted in 1981, the image was created using gouache, crayon and graphite on paper, and also appears in the liner notes to Shields, alongside other Diebenkorn works.

== Music video ==
A music video for "Yet Again," directed by Emily Kai Bock was released on September 27, 2012. The video begins with an ice skater practicing in an empty ice rink. The ice skater then breaks through the ice and winds up in a lake. She then walks through a carnival and through a forest in order to get back to her home. The video ends with the skater freaking out.

According to Bock, the skater was meant to be "symbolic of adolescence and the failure to learn a performance or role."

== Reception ==
Upon the single's release Pitchfork Media awarded the song "Best New Track", stating "With the Droste-led "Yet Again", [Grizzly Bear] suggest an arena-sized side of their ever-expanding sonic arsenal. Droste's vocal, soft and intimate as ever, suggests an affinity with the broad emotional palette of former touring partner Thom Yorke." Consequence of Sound described the track as a "more aggressive cut" than the band's previous single, "Sleeping Ute".

Rolling Stone named the song the 29th best song of 2012.
