= Horn of Plenty =

Horn of Plenty may refer to:

- Cornucopia, a symbolic, hollow horn filled with the inexhaustible gifts of celebratory fruits
- Craterellus cornucopioides, a mushroom resembling the shape of a cornucopia
- Horn of Plenty (Warren Vaché album), 1994
- Horn of Plenty (Grizzly Bear album), 2004
  - Horn of Plenty (The Remixes), a 2005 album by Grizzly Bear
- Horn of Plenty, a 1952 album by Dizzy Gillespie
- Horn of Plenty, a 1957 album by cornettist James F. Burke
- Horn of Plenty (film), a 2008 Cuban comedy film
- Horn of Plenty, the national anthem of Panem in the fictional world of The Hunger Games; see The Hunger Games (film)
- The Horn of Plenty, a 2009 fashion collection by Alexander McQueen

== See also ==
- Plenty of Horn (disambiguation)
