= Sleeping Ute (song) =

Single by Grizzly Bear

from the album Shields
- Released: June 5, 2012
- Recorded: Marfa, Texas, 2011
- Length: 4:35
- Label: Warp
- Songwriters: Ed Droste, Daniel Rossen, Chris Taylor, Christopher Bear
- Producer: Chris Taylor

Grizzly Bear singles chronology
"Cheerleader" (2009)	"Sleeping Ute" (2012)	"Yet Again" (2012)

"Sleeping Ute" is a song by American indie rock band Grizzly Bear, and the first single from the band's fourth studio album, Shields (2012). The song features lead vocals by guitarist Daniel Rossen.

== Background and recording ==
Along with Shields' (2012) second single, "Yet Again", "Sleeping Ute" was recorded during the band's initial recording sessions in Marfa, Texas. Vocalist and guitarist Daniel Rossen stated, "["Sleeping Ute"] was actually the oldest track in terms of when the song was written, and it's one of the only songs on the record that I wrote alone before coming to the band with it. That and "Yet Again" are the two songs that were done kind of separately from the band, a long time ago. "Ute" was one of the first songs we put down that we felt really good about."

Bassist and producer Chris Taylor stated, "I wanted the track to really open up in a way that felt very unhinged, like anything was possible. It's just one of those things: the myopic, to the kaleidoscopic, to the explosive."

== Charts ==
Chart performance for "Sleeping Ute"
Chart (2013)	Peak position
US Dance Singles Sales (Billboard)	1
