= Past Lives (soundtrack) =

Film score by Christopher Bear and Daniel Rossen
- Released: June 9, 2023
- Genre: Film score
- Length: 39:53
- Label: A24 Music
- Producers: Christopher Bear; Daniel Rossen

Past Lives is the soundtrack album to the 2023 film of the same name, composed by Grizzly Bear drummer Christopher Bear and singer-songwriter Daniel Rossen. It marked their film scoring debut as the band's music have been licensed for films in their past, and never scored film music. The soundtrack to the film consisted of 15 instrumental tracks from their score, and an original song "Quiet Eyes" by Sharon Van Etten. It was released on June 9, 2023 by A24's music division, a week after the theatrical release of the film.

== Development ==
Bear and Rossen wanted to capture the passage of time with their music, as the film travels from time periods and cities. They used cellos and keys to guide a scene during a montage where the characters communicate intercontinentally, which would be further guided by strings and synth. Although the band worked remotely in their respective studios, they built a matrix of emotions for plotting out sounds, where the themes would reappear into a color-coded graph which they confirm their relationships that drive the story. There are certain cues that focus on one of the themes but maybe related to the characters' relationship in their childhood and present, and inter-connect at the same time. Rossen complimented that Bear took a strong lead in a lot of the score, when compared to his band experience, who complimented it as one of an important role.

== Track listing ==
No.	Title	Length
1.	"If You Leave Something Behind"	1:20
2.	"Crossing"	1:28
3.	"You Gain Something Too"	1:06
4.	"Do You Remember Me"	1:17
5.	"I Remember You"	2:24
6.	"Across the Ocean"	4:32
7.	"Crossing II"	2:03
8.	"In Yun"	2:18
9.	"We Live Here"	1:38
10.	"Why Are You Going to New York"	2:54
11.	"Staring at a Ghost"	3:18
12.	"Bedroom"	2:33
13.	"An Immigrant and a Tourist"	2:22
14.	"Eight Thousand Layers"	2:58
15.	"See You"	4:05
16.	"Quiet Eyes" (Sharon Van Etten)	3:37
Total length:		39:53

== Reception ==
Tim Grierson of Screen International wrote, "Christopher Bear and Daniel Rossen’s lilting, mediative [sic] score is as finely calibrated as the film, piano and guitar offering lovely counterpoint to the onscreen drama." David Fear of Rolling Stone commented that the score "lays the swooning string section over everything just right." Tatsam Mukherjee in his review for The Wire wrote, "Christopher Bear and Daniel Rossen’s music never intrudes upon the film." Peter Debruge of Variety wrote, "The score practically bubbles with potential during the scenes where Nora and Hae Sung are video chatting — a youthful sound, compared with later, when strings speak to what they might have missed out on." Jacob Oller of Paste said that composers Bear and Rossen "nudge and prod our tear ducts, as if they needed it." David Rooney of The Hollywood Reporter said that the duo's "delicate chiming synth" score complimented Song's "visual command to match her emotional and philosophical insights." Richard Lawson of Vanity Fair wrote, "The invaluable score ... gracefully lilts around Hae Sung and Nora as they drift toward and away from one another." David Ehrlich of IndieWire wrote, "Christopher Bear and Daniel Rossen’s crystalline score allows the movie to find its proper time signature right from the start."
