= Shields (album) =

Studio album by Grizzly Bear
- Released: September 18, 2012
- Genres: Indie rock; neo-psychedelia; chamber pop; baroque pop
- Length: 47:53
- Label: Warp
- Producer: Chris Taylor

Grizzly Bear chronology
Veckatimest (2009)	Shields (2012)	Shields: B-sides (2013)

Singles from Shields
- 1. "Sleeping Ute" Released: June 5, 2012; 2. "Yet Again" Released: August 2, 2012; 3. "A Simple Answer" Released: 2012; 4. "Speak in Rounds" Released: 2012; 5. "Gun-Shy" Released: 2012

Shields is the fourth studio album by American rock band Grizzly Bear, released on September 18, 2012, by Warp Records. Written and recorded following a six-month hiatus from band activities, the album was produced by bassist and multi-instrumentalist Chris Taylor. Preceded by the singles, "Sleeping Ute" and "Yet Again", an expanded version of Shields, entitled Shields Expanded, was released on November 12, 2013, featuring additional tracks recorded during the sessions, demo recordings and remixes. The eight additional tracks were issued as a separate mini-album, entitled Shields: B-Sides.

Shields has been described as the band's most collaborative album, with vocalist and guitarist Daniel Rossen noting, "[The band's aim was to] write and make music that is as collaborative as possible, so that we have a product that we all feel a sense of authorship over as a collective."

The album received acclaim upon release. Shields reached number seven on the Billboard 200 and number seventeen on the UK Albums Chart.

== Background ==
After extensive touring in support of the band's third studio album, Veckatimest (2009), Grizzly Bear undertook a six-month hiatus from band-related activities. Vocalist Ed Droste noted, "There was such a level of exhaustion that I really needed to pretend I wasn't in the band for a little bit. I needed to be back in my life with my friends and my spouse, and live a day-to-day existence that had nothing to do with music. That was really good for everybody." Vocalist and guitarist Daniel Rossen stated, "Those were strange times. [...] I felt a little bit shell-shocked by the touring experience of Veckatimest and part of me was just wondering if there was some other version of a life that I could have that wasn't as heavily involved in the music industry."

During the break, bass guitarist and producer Chris Taylor released a solo album, Dreams Come True (2011), under the pseudonym CANT, stating, "I can't just take a break. For whatever reason, I'm the kind of person who needs to constantly to work on stuff. When we finished touring, I didn't want to take some time off, I just wanted to go into the studio. But, I really didn't want to book myself in with a band and go record them, so I decided I'd try and make my own record." Daniel Rossen recorded and released a solo EP, Silent Hour/Golden Mile (2012), featuring tracks initially intended for Shields.

== Recording ==
Regarding the band's eventual return, Ed Droste noted, "Coming back together to try to write and record was like being in junior high again – after you go away for the summer, the first couple of weeks are slightly awkward when you get back to school. Then, you get back into the swing." Daniel Rossen elaborated, "The whole process with this record felt like starting over. We took enough time off that we... I don't know. My head kind of went out of the game or something. Getting back into it was really confusing. It took a long time."

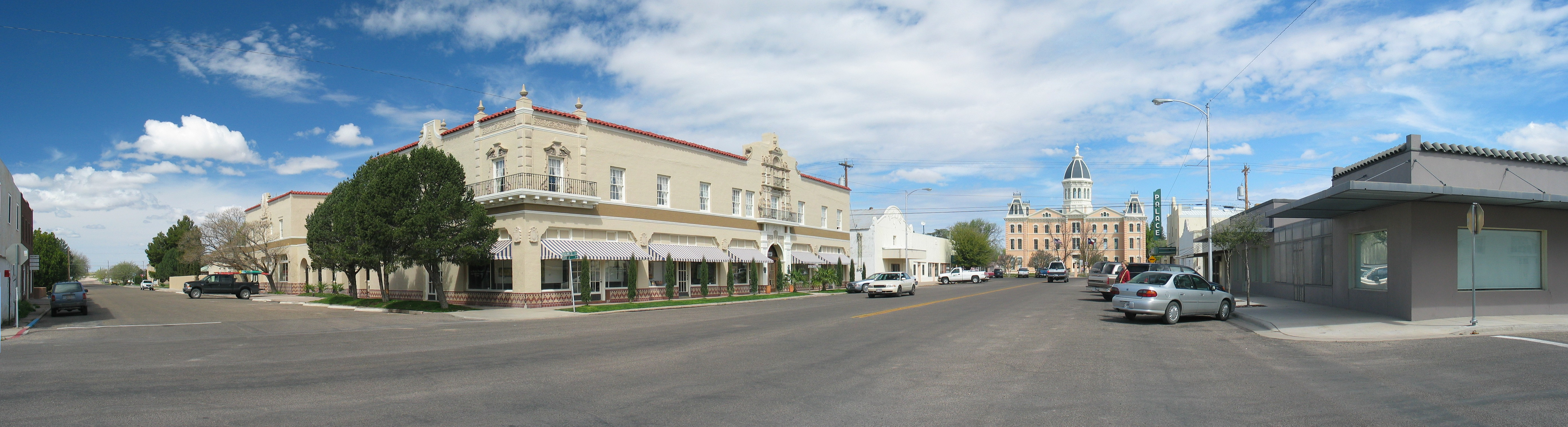
Marfa, Texas, where the band began its initial recording sessions.

In June 2011, the band moved to Marfa, Texas to begin recording their fourth studio album, with bassist and multi-instrumentalist Chris Taylor returning to his role as producer. Droste noted, "We had passed through before and there is a great arts collective and vibe. We decided to rent a place and make our next album there." The band recorded "an album's worth of material" in Marfa, but ultimately abandoned the majority of tracks. Vocalist Ed Droste noted, "We were like, 'We're ready to do this!' Then, we got there and recorded twelve songs and were like, 'This isn't quite there.'" Vocalist and guitarist Daniel Rossen elaborated, "We didn't have that unspoken momentum, that unspoken understanding of what everyone is into." Only two songs from these sessions made it onto the finished album; "Sleeping Ute" and "Yet Again".

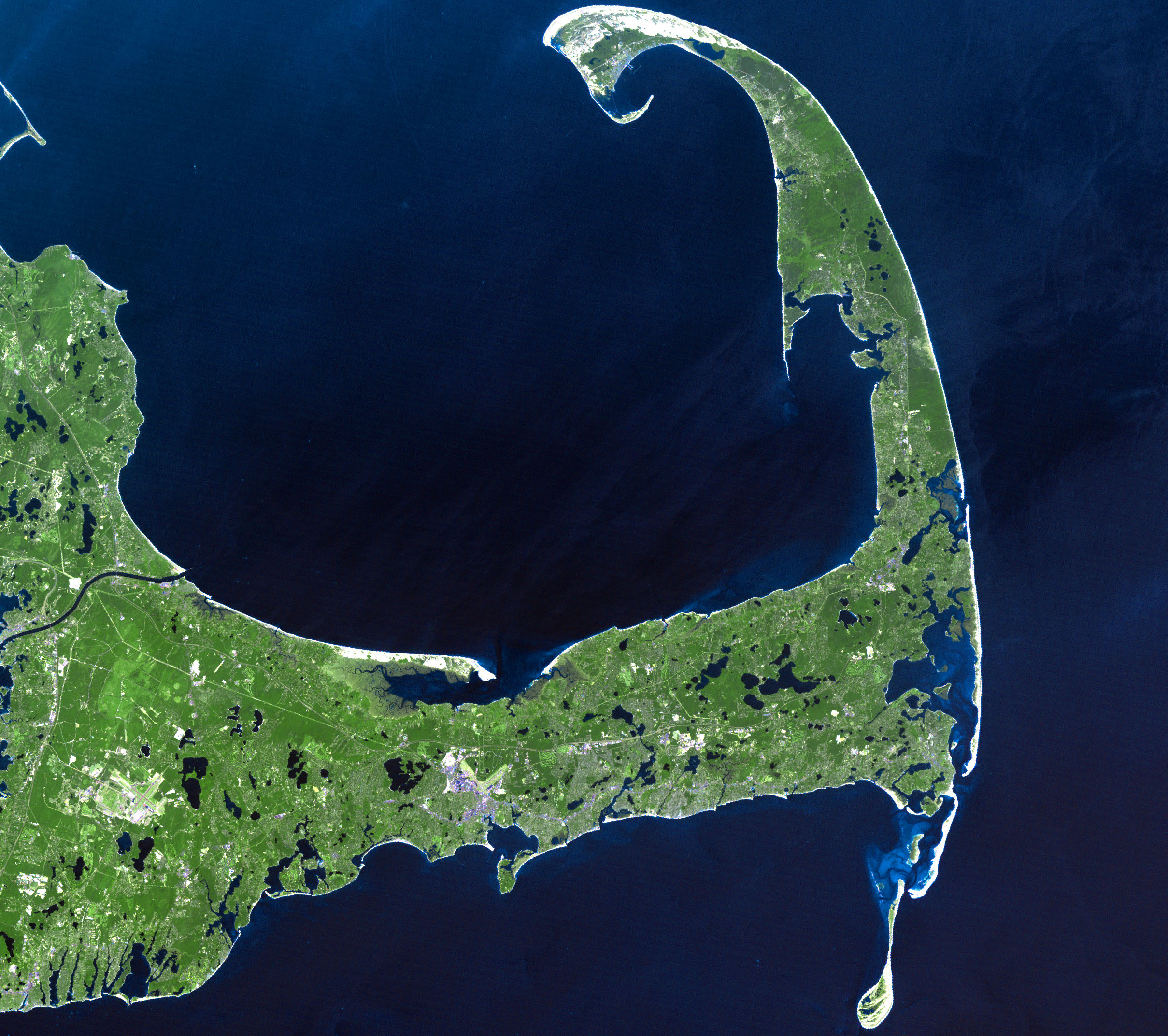
Cape Cod and Cape Cod Bay, where the band recorded the majority of the album's material.

The band subsequently started afresh in early 2012, returning to Droste's mother's home in Cape Cod, where the band had previously recorded its second studio album, Yellow House (2006). Commenting on the return to Yellow House, Droste noted, "It's so funny that we went back there in the end. It's my grandmother's house, we know it, and we can use it for free. And as soon as we got there, things started happening. [...] We just sat by the fire, Dan strumming, me singing, and it happened. Some of the best songs on the record, like "Speak in Rounds" and "Half Gate", came out of that. We stayed there in isolation for two months straight." Droste stated that he and Rossen decided to "'try writing from the bottom up. We've never done it before.' There's a little bit of fear there because it's a new process we've never tried. We've never sat side by side and said, 'Let's literally, out of the ether, start writing songs together.' A couple of songs came that way, and that's why they're verse me, chorus Dan. [...] Suddenly the synergy hit, and the momentum struck, and then everyone got excited. And that's when the ball started to roll, and then we just started playing around, and people were much more open.""

Ed Droste described Shields' overall aesthetic as "very in-your-face", saying that "the drums and vocals are clearer and louder. It's not as dreamy and pastoral and sleepy as past efforts, and there's a lot of raw vocal takes, which is something we don't normally do." Rossen elaborated, "Previous records were definitely dreamier with lots of layered vocals and we've started paring those back and taking them away, taking them away. That's what we went for on this record: clearer performances and more direct arrangements."

Talking about Chris Taylor's production, Rossen stated, "Part of his strength is that he pushes us. [...] He enables us to try stranger stuff; he pushes us to that side of ourselves. [...] He's always thinking of the whole palette, I feel, whereas Ed and I might be more worried about a melody or a lyric." The album was mixed by Michael Brauer.

== Writing and composition ==
The songwriting process for Shields was more collaborative than on past releases, with vocalist Ed Droste noting, "As we get older, more confident, and more mature, we're becoming more comfortable with stepping on each other's toes." Pairs of band members did writing retreats with each other, with band members regularly building off of other members' ideas.

Lyrically, Ed Droste described Shields as Grizzly Bear's "most verbose album" yet, noting, "It's funny, because I think back to a song like "Colorado", where I was basically singing ten words over and over again for five minutes straight – and that's it. There's nothing on this album like that. There's a lot more there, verbally, and it's definitely emotionally charged." Bassist and producer, Chris Taylor stated, "For this record, it was really important to us to try and make sure that lyrics had a weight to them and at least some sense of a narrative, even if it was loose. There were lyrics in previous albums that seemed to have no meaning whatsoever. And that always really annoyed me. We agreed it'd be really important and awesome if we could just try and make all the lyrics tell something. [...] I was definitely able to use lyrics as a frame to how I would let the arrangements build and then fall away."

Regarding the album's thematic content, Daniel Rossen noted, "There's a lot of talk about negotiating distance from people in your life. We were dealing with that in various forms, learning what it means to be alone, learning what it means to be close to somebody, certain things coming to a head. It just feels like a major difficulty in life." Droste elaborated, "There's a desire to be autonomous, but there's also this great fear of being alone, and there's this constant feeling of, 'How do you reconcile this?' There's this need for space, but there's also this, 'Come closer come closer.'"

== Artwork and release ==
The album's artwork features paintings throughout by American artist Richard Diebenkorn, with its front cover featuring his 1981 print, Blue Club. Each Diebenkorn piece included features either a spade or club symbol, traditionally found on playing cards.

Grizzly Bear revealed that they were working on a new album on May 10, 2011. The release date, track listing and the song "Sleeping Ute" were announced on June 5, 2012, while the title and cover art was announced on July 9, 2012. A second song from the album, "Yet Again", was released on August 2, 2012. On September 9, 2012, Shields was streamed in its entirety on NPR.

On September 27, 2012, a music video for "Yet Again" was released. On January 28, 2013, a music video for "gun-shy" was released. Director Kris Moyes described the video for "gun-shy" as "a very rare glimpse of what creative energy could look like on a molecular level, if it could be seen."

=== Shields: Expanded and Shields: B-Sides ===
On September 17, 2013, Grizzly Bear announced reissues of the album, "Shields: Expanded" and "Shields: B-Sides", which were released November 11 (12 in North America) 2013. Alongside the original track list, "Shields: Expanded", available on double CD or as a digital download, included 8 additional songs, including bonus tracks, demos from the recording sessions in Marfa, Texas, and remixes by Lindstrøm, Liars and Nicolas Jaar. The 8 extra tracks were made available separately as "Shields: B-Sides", on either 12" vinyl or digital download.

== Critical reception ==
Professional ratings
Aggregate scores
Source	Rating
AnyDecentMusic?	8.0/10
Metacritic	86/100
Review scores
Source	Rating
AllMusic	4/5 stars
The A.V. Club	A−
The Guardian	4/5 stars
Mojo	4/5 stars
NME	7/10
Pitchfork	9.1/10
Q	4/5 stars
Rolling Stone	4/5 stars
Spin	8/10
Uncut	8/10

Shields received widespread critical acclaim upon its release. At Metacritic, which assigns a normalized rating out of 100 to reviews from mainstream critics, the album has received an average score of 86, based on 36 reviews, indicating "universal acclaim". Pitchfork's Lindsay Zoladz gave the album a Best New Music designation, writing "While there's no question that Grizzly Bear's last two records have sounded gorgeous, critics of the band have wondered if that's enough. Shields, the band's fourth and most compositionally adventurous record, should put those concerns to bed. Though full of baroque, detail-rich production and latticework melodies, Shields also offers an emotionally resonant core." In another positive review, AllMusic's Heather Phares wrote: "While it's not as obviously big a statement as Veckatimest was, Shields is plenty ambitious in its own right, and its complexity demands and rewards patient listening." The A.V. Club's Chris DeVille praised the contributions of Chris Taylor and Christopher Bear, stating, "On an album that touches repeatedly on the barriers people build between each other, the members of Grizzly Bear have forged further ahead into sweet synchronicity. Sam Cleeve of Drowned in Sound called Shields "[..] [A] warm-blooded record, beholden to analogue gear and flawless mastering — one destined to fit snugly on a turntable rather than to live as ones and zeros on your iPod", while PopMatters' Robert Alford called it "an album that unveils deeper levels of emotional impact and aesthetic dimension for a band that continues to challenge and captivate in ways that are entirely their own."

Kevin Liedel of Slant Magazine, on the other hand, gave the album a mixed review, writing "But while the band admirably seeks to avoid mimicking Veckatimest's themes, it neither expands on those motifs nor presents anything interesting in their place. Pretty but formless, Shields plays like a calculated retreat into something altogether indistinct and inconsequential."

Pitchfork ranked Shields at number 10 on its list of the top 50 albums of 2012, writing: "Shields is a magnificent record, where the lights are blazing, but nobody's feeling very much at home." The album was also listed at number 35 on Rolling Stone's list of the top 50 albums of 2012, saying " Ed Droste and Daniel Rossen have grown into one of indie rock's most sophisticated songwriting teams, melding idiosyncratic approaches to texture and tune into a subtly mind-blowing whole." The album was listed at number 16 on Stereogum's list of top 50 albums of 2012.

== Commercial performance ==
Shields debuted at number seven on the Billboard 200 with first-week sales of 39,000 copies, the band's highest chart position and best sales week yet. In the United Kingdom, the album entered the UK Albums Chart at number seventeen, selling 6,462 copies in its first week. It is also Warp's highest-charting release in the U.S.

== Track listing ==
All tracks are written by Grizzly Bear.

No.	Title	Lead vocals	Length
1.	"Sleeping Ute"	Rossen	4:35
2.	"Speak in Rounds"	Droste/Rossen	4:24
3.	"Adelma"		1:02
4.	"Yet Again"	Droste	5:18
5.	"The Hunt"	Droste	3:44
6.	"A Simple Answer"	Rossen	6:00
7.	"What's Wrong?"	Droste/Rossen	5:44
8.	"Gun-Shy"	Droste/Taylor	4:30
9.	"Half Gate"	Droste/Rossen	5:29
10.	"Sun in Your Eyes"	Rossen	7:08

Shields: Expanded bonus tracks (Available separately on Shields: B-Sides EP)
No.	Title	Lead vocals	Length
11.	"Smothering Green"	Rossen	6:30
12.	"Taken Down"	Droste/Rossen	5:13
13.	"Listen and Wait"	Rossen/Droste	3:28
14.	"Everyone I Know"	Droste	2:21
15.	"Will Calls"	Droste/Rossen	6:51
16.	"Sleeping Ute" (Nicolas Jaar remix)		7:50
17.	"A Simple Answer" (Liars remix)		7:59
18.	"Gun-Shy" (Lindstrøm remix)		6:54

== Personnel ==
Credits for Shields adapted from album liner notes.

=== Grizzly Bear ===
- Christopher Bear – drums, percussion, backing vocals, drum machine, lap steel, wurlitzer, synths
- Edward Droste – lead and backing vocals
- Daniel Rossen – lead and backing vocals, guitars, pianos, synths, cello, the wheel, horn and string arrangements
- Chris Taylor – bass guitar, backing vocals, synths, saxophones, clarinet, bass clarinet, flutes, drum machine, the wheel, horn and string arrangements

=== Additional musicians ===
- Tatum Greenblatt – trumpet, flugelhorn
- Louis Shwadron – French horn
- Nat Baldwin – upright bass

=== Production ===
- Chris Taylor – producer, recording
- Michael Brauer – mixing
- Ryan Gilligan – engineer
- Yale Yng-Wong – assistant recording engineer
- Jake Aron – assistant recording engineer
- Bob Ludwig – mastering

=== Artwork ===
- Richard Diebenkorn – art
- Ben Tousley – design, art direction

== Charts ==
Chart (2012)	Peak position
Australian Albums Chart	17
Austrian Albums Chart	59
Belgian Albums Chart (Flanders)	13
Belgian Albums Chart (Wallonia)	25
Canadian Albums Chart	16
Danish Albums Chart	16
Dutch Albums Chart	35
Finnish Albums Chart	46
French Albums Chart	37
German Albums Chart	40
Irish Albums Chart	14
Irish Indie Albums Chart	4
Italian Albums Chart	93
Japanese Albums Chart	84
New Zealand Albums Chart	23
Norwegian Albums Chart	26
Scottish Albums Chart	20
Swedish Albums Chart	33
Swiss Albums Chart	29
UK Albums Chart	17
UK Indie Albums Chart	2
US Billboard 200	7
US Alternative Albums	2
US Independent Albums	1
US Rock Albums	3
