= Golden Suits =

- Origin: Brooklyn, New York, U.S.
- Genres: Indie rock, psychedelic rock, psychedelic folk, folk rock,
- Years active: 2013-Present
- Labels: Yep Roc
- Members: Fred Nicolaus

Golden Suits is the solo project of Fred Nicolaus, a member of the indie rock band Department of Eagles.

== History ==
In 2011, Nicolaus began writing songs outside of the Department of Eagles project, inspired by an eventful year in his life as well as the works of fiction writer John Cheever. Over the course of two years he recorded his first solo record, enlisting the help of fellow Department of Eagles member Daniel Rossen, Grizzly Bear members Chris Bear and Chris Taylor, and several other Brooklyn musicians. The self-titled record was released in 2013 on Yep Roc Records. A sophomore album, "Kubla Khan," was released in 2016.

The name of a project is a reference to a line in the Cheever short story "The Country Husband." In 2014 Nicolaus filmed a video for the single "Swimming in '99" in which he attempted to buy every copy of The Stories Of John Cheever available for sale in Manhattan in one day. He later wrote about the experience for the magazine Radio Silence.

== Discography ==
- Golden Suits CD and LP, Yep Roc 2014
- Kubla Khan CD and LP, Hit City USA 2016

== Reviews ==
- Pitchfork
- Drowned in Sound
- The 405
- Allmusic Guide
- NME
