= Blue Valentine =

Blue Valentine may refer to:

- "A Blue Valentine", a poem by American poet Joyce Kilmer
- Blue Valentine (Tom Waits album), 1978, with the song "Blue Valentines"
- Blue Valentine (film), a 2010 film starring Ryan Gosling and Michelle Williams
  - Blue Valentine (soundtrack)
- "Blue Valentine", a 2021 song by Telenova
- "Blue Valentine", a 2025 song by Nessa Barrett from Aftercare
- Blue Valentine (Nmixx album), 2025
  - "Blue Valentine" (song)
- "Blue Valentine" (Holby City), a television episode

== See also ==
- Valentine (disambiguation)
