= Philippe von Borries =

German-born entrepreneur

- Born: December 1978 (age 47); Cologne, Germany
- Education: Columbia University (BA)
- Occupation: Entrepreneur
- Employer: Lonely Planet
- Known for: Co-founder and former CEO of Refinery29
- Title: President
- Spouse: Piera Gelardi

Philippe von Borries is a German-born entrepreneur. He co-founded Refinery29 and served as co-CEO of the company. He is currently entrepreneur-in-residence of Red Ventures and the former president of Lonely Planet.

== Early life and education ==
von Borries was born in Cologne, Germany. He graduated from Concord Academy in Massachusetts, and received his bachelor's degree in history from Columbia University. He attended high school with Grizzly Bear singer Ed Droste.

== Career ==
Upon graduating from Columbia, he moved to Washington, D.C., to join the Globalist, an online international affairs magazine that focuses on the economy, politics and culture of globalization.

In 2005, von Borries co-founded Refinery29 with his high school friend Justin Stefano, his wife Piera Gelardi and Christene Barberich as a localized New York platform for discovering independent boutiques and shops. The company later evolved to include digital media and e-commerce features. The company raised around $130 million from investors including First Round Capital, Floodgate Fund, Stripes Group, WPP plc, Scripps Networks Interactive, and Hearst Communications.

=== Vice Media sale ===
von Borries stepped down from a Refinery29 management role in 2019 after Vice Media's acquisition of Refinery29 for a reported $460 million. His wife, Piera Gelardi, continued as Refinery29's executive creative director. von Borries later joined Red Ventures in November 2020 and became the head of Lonely Planet. In 2022, Lonely Planet bought Elsewhere, a website that links travelers directly with experts who assist in designing trips.

== Recognition ==
von Borries was named one of the "Silicon Alley 100" in 2013 and 2015 by Business Insider and named to the 2016 New Power New York List by Variety magazine. In 2018, Refinery29 laid off ten percent of its workforce.

In 2020, von Borries wrote a letter with Refinery29 cofounder Justin Stefano apologizing to the company's Black and employees of color for tokenizing staff and making them feel that they didn't belong.
