= Painted Ruins =

Studio album by Grizzly Bear
- Released: August 18, 2017
- Studio: Allaire, Shokan, New York; Terrible, Los Angeles, California
- Genre: Indie rock; chamber pop; psychedelic pop
- Length: 48:28
- Label: RCA
- Producer: Chris Taylor

Grizzly Bear chronology
Shields: B-sides (2013)	Painted Ruins (2017)

Singles from Painted Ruins
- 1. "Three Rings" Released: May 4, 2017; 2. "Mourning Sound" Released: May 17, 2017; 3. "Four Cypresses" Released: June 23, 2017; 4. "Neighbors" Released: July 21, 2017; 5. "Losing All Sense" Released: September 28, 2017

Painted Ruins is the fifth studio album by American rock band Grizzly Bear, released on August 18, 2017, by RCA Records. Along with the announcement of the album, the band announced a fall European and North American tour.

== Recording ==
Grizzly Bear spent two years writing and recording for the album. Band member Chris Taylor produced Painted Ruins, with recording sessions occurring primarily at Allaire Studios in Shokan, New York, but also at various locations around Los Angeles, including Taylor's own Terrible Studios.

== Release ==
Prior to the release of the first single from the album, the band uploaded a series of mysterious teaser videos to their YouTube account.

On May 4, 2017, the first single from the album, "Three Rings", was released. The song was officially released at midnight in each successive time zone across the globe, and was later uploaded to their YouTube channel.

On May 17, Grizzly Bear revealed the name and release date of the upcoming album, and also announced their first tour in four years, beginning in Dublin, Ireland on October 5, and continuing through the end of the year, with concerts in Europe and North America. Later that same day, Grizzly Bear released the second single from the album, "Mourning Sound".

On June 23, the band released the third track from the record, "Four Cypresses".

On July 21, the band released the fourth single from the record, "Neighbors".

The final single from the album, "Losing All Sense," was released on September 28 of 2017.

== Critical reception ==
Professional ratings
Aggregate scores
Source	Rating
AnyDecentMusic?	7.6/10
Metacritic	82/100
Review scores
Source	Rating
AllMusic	3.5/5 stars
The A.V. Club	A−
The Guardian	4/5 stars
The Irish Times	4/5 stars
Mojo	4/5 stars
The Observer	4/5 stars
Pitchfork	7.3/10
Q	4/5 stars
Rolling Stone	3.5/5 stars
Uncut	9/10

Painted Ruins has received acclaim from music critics. At Metacritic, which assigns a normalized rating out of 100 to reviews from mainstream critics, the album has an average score of 82 out of 100, which indicates "universal acclaim" based on 29 reviews.

Laura Snapes in The Observer described the album as "Unbeholden to the band’s existence, Painted Ruins has a cavalier quality that you’d struggle to spot in its tense forebears".

=== Accolades ===
Publication	Accolade	Year	Rank	Ref.
Uncut	75 best Albums of the Year	2017	20	
Rolling Stone	50 Best Albums of 2017	2017	40	
Earbuddy	Top 50 Albums of 2017	2017	83	
Drowned in Sound	Favourite Albums of 2017	2017	20	

== Track listing ==
All tracks are written by Grizzly Bear.

No.	Title	Lead vocals	Length
1.	"Wasted Acres"	Rossen	2:52
2.	"Mourning Sound"	Droste/Rossen	4:22
3.	"Four Cypresses"	Rossen	4:48
4.	"Three Rings"	Droste	4:49
5.	"Losing All Sense"	Droste/Rossen	5:06
6.	"Aquarian"	Rossen	4:18
7.	"Cut-Out"	Droste/Rossen	3:46
8.	"Glass Hillside"	Rossen	4:54
9.	"Neighbors"	Droste	4:44
10.	"Systole"	Taylor	3:16
11.	"Sky Took Hold"	Droste	5:33
Total length:			48:28

== Personnel ==
Credits:

- Christopher Bear – drums, percussion, synths, vocals, drum programming, wurlitzer, pedal steel
- Edward Droste – vocals
- Daniel Rossen – vocals, guitars, piano, synths, organ, cello
- Chris Taylor – vocals, bass, saxophones, clarinet, flute, bass harmonica, synths, drum programming

== Charts ==
Chart (2017)	Peak position
Australian Albums (ARIA)	26
Austrian Albums (Ö3 Austria)	46
Belgian Albums (Ultratop Flanders)	18
Belgian Albums (Ultratop Wallonia)	32
Canadian Albums (Billboard)	31
French Albums (SNEP)	82
German Albums (Offizielle Top 100)	27
Irish Albums (OCC)	6
New Zealand Albums (RMNZ)	37
Portuguese Albums (AFP)	19
Scottish Albums (OCC)	17
Swiss Albums (Schweizer Hitparade)	16
UK Albums (OCC)	14
US Billboard 200	27
US Top Rock Albums (Billboard)	4
