= Shields: B-sides =

Album by Grizzly Bear

Shields: B-Sides

Compilation album by Grizzly Bear
- Released: November 11, 2013
- Recorded: 2011, Marfa, Texas
- Genre: Indie rock
- Length: 47:06
- Label: Warp

Grizzly Bear chronology
Shields (2012)	Shields: B-Sides (2013)	Painted Ruins (2017)

Singles from Shields
- 1. "Will Calls" Released: September 17, 2013; 2. "Listen and Wait" Released: October 30, 2013

Professional ratings
Review scores
Source	Rating
Exclaim.ca	7/10 stars
Pitchfork	7.4/10 stars

Shields: B-Sides is a compilation mini-album by American indie rock band Grizzly Bear, released on November 11, 2013, on Warp Records. The release is available on 12" vinyl and on digital download, and features eight tracks, five of which were recorded during the same sessions that yielded the band's fourth studio album, Shields (2012). The tracks were also released simultaneously on an extended version of the full-length album, entitled Shields: Expanded.

Alongside the five original tracks, the release includes remixes from Lindstrøm (a track that originally featured on the Record Store Day Release 'Brian Eno x Nicolas Jaar x Grizzly Bear'), Liars and Nicolas Jaar.

== Release ==
The band announced the reissues on September 17 with a stream of "Will Calls", one of 5 new tracks taken from the recording sessions for the 'Shields' album. This was followed by another track "Listen and Wait" on October 30.

== Track listing ==
No.	Title	Length
1.	"Smothering Green"	6:30
2.	"Taken Down" (Marfa Demo)	5:12
3.	"Listen and Wait"	3:28
4.	"Everyone I Know" (Marfa Demo)	2:21
5.	"Will Calls" (Marfa Demo)	6:51
6.	"Sleeping Ute" (Nicolas Jaar Remix)	7:50
7.	"A Simple Answer" (Liars Remix)	8:00
8.	"Gun-Shy" (Lindstrom Remix)	6:56

== Personnel ==
=== Grizzly Bear ===
- Christopher Bear – drums, percussion, backing vocals, drum machine, lap steel, wurlitzer, synths
- Edward Droste – lead and backing vocals
- Daniel Rossen – lead and backing vocals, guitars, pianos, synths, cello, the wheel, horn and string arrangements
- Chris Taylor – bass guitar, backing vocals, synths, saxophones, clarinet, bass clarinet, flutes, drum machine, the wheel, horn and string arrangements

=== Recording personnel ===
- Chris Taylor – producer, recording
- Michael Brauer – mixing
- Ryan Gilligan – engineer
- Yale Yng-Wong – assistant recording engineer
- Jake Aron – assistant recording engineer
- Bob Ludwig – mastering

=== Artwork ===
- Richard Diebenkorn – art
- Ben Tousley – design, art direction
