= Silent Hour/Golden Mile =

EP by Daniel Rossen
- Released: March 20, 2012
- Recorded: 2010–2011
- Studio: Various rooms, New York City; Miner Street, Philadelphia
- Length: 23:07
- Label: Warp
- Producer: Daniel Rossen

Daniel Rossen chronology
Silent Hour/Golden Mile (2012)	You Belong There (2022)

Silent Hour/Golden Mile is the debut solo EP by American musician Daniel Rossen, released on March 20, 2012 by Warp Records. The self-produced EP comprises tracks Rossen had initially written for Grizzly Bear's fourth studio album, Shields (2012).

== Background and recording ==
After extensive touring in support of Grizzly Bear's third studio album, Veckatimest (2009), the band undertook a six-month hiatus, with Daniel Rossen writing new material during the break.

Rossen ultimately decided to release a solo EP; a decision informed by the band's increasing collaborative nature. Rossen noted, "Recently the way it’s been feeling is that if I finish a song and the full form is there – the lyrics and an arrangement I’ve already decided on – that pretty much automatically means it’s something I should work on alone. It doesn’t really work well to force parts onto Grizzly Bear. [...] Grizzly Bear has become very collaborative, very collective. That’s kind of why [the] EP happened."

The majority of the EP was recorded in New York City, with Rossen stating, "I didn’t fully move out of the city but I was spending the majority of my time in upstate New York, a lot of it in the winter. I recorded a lot of [Silent Hour/Golden Mile] in that space of time out there."

Professional ratings
Aggregate scores
Source	Rating
Metacritic	84/100
Review scores
Source	Rating
AllMusic	3.5/5 stars
The A.V. Club	A
Beats Per Minute	82%
Consequence of Sound	4/5 stars
Drowned in Sound	7/10
NME	8/10
Pitchfork	8.0/10
Slant Magazine	2.5/5 stars
Spin	7/10
Under the Radar	7/10

== Track listing ==
All tracks are written by Daniel Rossen.

No.	Title	Length
1.	"Up on High"	3:56
2.	"Silent Song"	4:42
3.	"Return to Form"	5:23
4.	"Saint Nothing"	4:50
5.	"Golden Mile"	4:16
Total length:		23:07

== Personnel ==
=== Musicians ===
- Daniel Rossen – vocals, guitar, bass guitar, piano, keyboards, cello, drums, percussion
- Scott Hirsch – lap steel guitar (1 and 3)
- Eric Slick – drums (5)
- Frank Cohen – trombone (3 and 4)
- Nick Tucker – bassoon (3 and 4)
- Ben Brody – french horn (3 and 4)
- Zubin Hensler – trumpet (3 and 4)
- Ian Davis – horn arrangements (3)
- Kris Nolte – horn arrangements (4)

=== Recording personnel ===
- Daniel Rossen – producer, recording
- Jon Low – recording engineer (5)
- Nicolas Vernhes – mixing
- Greg Calbi – mastering

=== Artwork ===
- Amelia Bauer – artwork
