= Sorry for the Delay (disambiguation) =

Sorry for the Delay is a 2006 album by Grizzly Bear.

Sorry for the Delay may also refer to:

- Sorry for the Delay, a 2009 album by 340ml
- Sorry for the Delay, a 2012 album by Just a Band
