= Friend (EP) =

EP by Grizzly Bear
- Released: November 5, 2007
- Recorded: 2005–2007
- Genre: Psychedelic folk
- Length: 43:18
- Label: Warp
- Producers: Chris Taylor, Daniel Rossen

Grizzly Bear chronology
Yellow House (2006)	Friend (2007)	Veckatimest (2009)

Professional ratings
Review scores
Source	Rating
AllMusic	4/5 stars
Pitchfork	8.5/10
PopMatters	8/10 stars
Robert Christgau	(dud)
Rolling Stone	3/5 stars

Friend is an EP by the Brooklyn-based band Grizzly Bear, their first release following the critically acclaimed Yellow House. It was released on November 5, 2007 on Warp Records. The EP has tracks recorded during sessions for the Yellow House album, as well as covers of their songs by Band of Horses, CSS and Atlas Sound.

== Track listing ==
No.	Title	Length
1.	"Alligator" (Choir version)	5:12
2.	"He Hit Me" (cover of The Crystals)	4:21
3.	"Little Brother" (Electric version)	6:29
4.	"Shift" (Alternate version)	3:30
5.	"Plans" (Terrible vs. Nonhorse: Sounds edit)	1:36
6.	"Granny Diner"	4:46
7.	"Knife" (covered by CSS)	3:14
8.	"Plans" (covered by Band of Horses)	3:23
9.	"Knife" (covered by Atlas Sound)	4:54
10.	"Deep Blue Sea" (Cover of The Weavers, Daniel Rossen home recording)	5:49
11.	"(untitled)"	0:04
12.	"Easier (Recorded Live at KEXP, 16 February 2007)" (iTunes Store bonus track (US and Canada only))	4:08
Total length:		43:18

== Personnel ==
Grizzly Bear

- Ed Droste – vocals, keyboards, various instruments
- Daniel Rossen – vocals, whistling (Shift), guitars, various instruments
- Chris Taylor – bass guitar, backing vocals, whistling (Shift), various instruments
- Christopher Bear – drums, percussion, backing vocals

Additional musicians

- Zach Condon – additional player (1 and 11)
- Dave Longstreth – additional player (1)
- Amber Coffman – additional player (1)
- Lucas Crane – additional player (5)
- CSS – performers (7)
- Band of Horses – performers (8)
- Atlas Sound – performer (9)

Recording personnel

- Chris Taylor – producer, recording
- Daniel Rossen – producer, recording (10)
- Danny Kadar – producer, engineer (8)
- Band of Horses – producer, engineer (8)
- Bradford Cox – producer, recording (9)

Artwork

- Ben Tousley – design
- Amelia Bauer – photography and disc illustration
- Josh Faught – "Friend" banner

== Charts ==
Chart	Peak position
US Heatseekers Albums (Billboard)	7
US Tastemaker Albums (Billboard)	14
