= Cheerleader (Grizzly Bear song) =

Single by Grizzly Bear

from the album Veckatimest
- Released: 2009
- Recorded: 2008
- Length: 4:54
- Label: Warp
- Songwriter: Grizzly Bear
- Producer: Chris Taylor

Grizzly Bear singles chronology
"While You Wait for the Others" (2009)	"Cheerleader" (2009)	"Sleeping Ute" (2012)

"Cheerleader" is a song by New York-based indie rock band Grizzly Bear. It was released in 2009 as a single from the band's third album, Veckatimest, though the song had been leaked, along with the rest of the album, months before the intended release date.

Unlike three other songs from the album ("Two Weeks", "Ready, Able", and "While You Wait for the Others"), "Cheerleader" did not receive a music video.

== Reception ==
Like the rest of Veckatimest, "Cheerleader" received positive reviews from critics. In a review for Pitchfork, Zach Kelly wrote "'Cheerleader' is ultimately defined by the fact that it's so nuanced and textured, using all that wide-open space to laze in its own detail. Aside from the fact that it's one of the most striking vocal contributions we've ever heard from Ed Droste, the lilting flute, sighing strings and (what sounds to be) a boys' choir all are breathtaking because of their subtlety."
