= Two Weeks (Grizzly Bear song) =

Single by Grizzly Bear

from the album Veckatimest
- Released: June 1, 2009
- Recorded: 2008
- Genre: Indie pop; chamber pop; baroque pop; indie rock
- Length: 4:03
- Label: Warp
- Songwriter: Grizzly Bear
- Producer: Chris Taylor

Grizzly Bear singles chronology
"Knife" (2007)	"Two Weeks" (2009)	"While You Wait for the Others" (2009)

"Two Weeks" is a song by the American indie rock band Grizzly Bear, and the first single from the band's third studio album, Veckatimest. Featuring backing vocals from Victoria Legrand, singer and organist for the dream pop duo Beach House, it was released as a single on June 1, 2009. The song's debut live performance was on the Late Show with David Letterman in July 2008.

== Music video ==
The video for "Two Weeks" was directed by Patrick Daughters. It features the band members sitting on an altar at an empty church, singing along to the song as slowly their heads and faces start to glow, then sparks fly from their heads and ultimately their heads catch fire as the video ends. When interviewed by Amanda Petrusich, band singer Ed Droste explained:

We don't ever dictate our videos, which is why they're each so different. They're always almost the opposite of what I would've imagined [for] them, which is actually what's really fun. It's sort of like getting a remix back. It's like, "What part of the song, what essence of the song, is that artist gonna pick up on and use?" Take the "Knife" video, which was really out there as well-- it was like, we liked what those artists [Encyclopedia Pictura] had done, and we said "You know what? Just do what you're gonna do and we'll release it."

== Reception ==
Upon its release, "Two Weeks" was acclaimed by music critics, and many regarded it as a highlight of Veckatimest. Pitchfork Media ranked the song at No. 162 in its "Top 500 Tracks of the 2000s" list. It was voted at No. 61 on Triple J's Hottest 100 for 2009. Stereogum cited it as the sixth best song of the group.

"Two Weeks" has gained popularity in YouTube, where its video clip (uploaded by the verified channel of the original group) has over 14 million views. Das Racist refers to the song in the track "Free Jazzmatazz." They claim about their own song: "this is the best song ever. Better than 'Juicy' ... better than "Two Weeks" by Grizzly Bear. That's a pretty good song, right?" Childish Gambino also sampled and rapped over the song, now called "Bitch Look At Me Now", on his 2010 mixtape I am Just a Rapper.

The song was featured in the 2012 movie The Dictator, an episode of the television series How I Met Your Mother, and a Volkswagen commercial aired during Super Bowl XLIV.

== Track listing ==
No.	Title	Length
1.	"Two Weeks"	4:03
2.	"Two Weeks (Fred Falke Radio Mix)"	3:57
3.	"Two Weeks (Fred Falke Extended Mix)"	7:58
4.	"Two Weeks (Fred Falke Instrumental Mix)"	7:58

== Charts ==
Chart performance for "Two Weeks"
Chart (2009)	Peak position
Belgium (Ultratip Bubbling Under Wallonia)	26
Mexico Ingles Airplay (Billboard)	14
UK Indie (OCC)	15
UK Physical Singles (OCC)	74
US Dance Singles Sales (Billboard)	8
US Hot Singles Sales (Billboard)	13

== Certifications ==
Region	Certification	Certified units/sales
United Kingdom (BPI)	Silver	200,000^{‡}
^{‡} Sales+streaming figures based on certification alone.
