= Yellow House (album) =

Studio album by Grizzly Bear
- Released: September 4, 2006
- Recorded: July 2006
- Genres: Psychedelic folk; indie folk; pop
- Length: 50:00
- Label: Warp
- Producer: Chris Taylor

Grizzly Bear chronology
Sorry for the Delay (2006)	Yellow House (2006)	Friend (2007)

Singles from Yellow House
- 1. "On a Neck, On a Spit" Released: August 21, 2006; 2. "Knife" Released: May 21, 2007

Yellow House is the second studio album by American rock band Grizzly Bear, released on September 4, 2006 in the UK and the next day in the United States, by Warp Records. Produced by bass guitarist and multi-instrumentalist Chris Taylor, the album's title refers to vocalist Ed Droste's mother's house where the majority of recording took place.

The album is the first to feature both Taylor and vocalist and guitarist Daniel Rossen, and received critical acclaim upon its release, significantly increasing the band's exposure. An EP, Friend, was released the following year featuring material recorded mostly during the same sessions.

== Background ==
Following the release of Horn of Plenty in 2004, Grizzly Bear expanded from being the solo moniker for vocalist Ed Droste into a full band, with the addition of Horn of Plenty collaborator Christopher Bear, bassist and multi-instrumentalist Chris Taylor, and guitarist and vocalist Daniel Rossen. Christopher Bear noted, "Getting together the band for the live show changed things quite a bit, in terms of dynamics and instrumentation used. The songs [on Horn of Plenty] were quite simple and open ended so it left a lot of room for interpretation, which was great because it allowed us to get a band sound happening and working on a very reactionary level."

== Recording ==
With the four-piece band line-up in place, Grizzly Bear began recording at Ed Droste's mother's house on Cape Cod in July 2006, with bassist and multi-instrumentalist Chris Taylor adopting the role of producer. Drummer Christopher Bear stated, "A lot of the stuff we'd end up recording was really late at night, after voices had really warmed up, or after properly loosening up at our religious cocktail hour." Following a month of initial tracking, each band member added individual overdubs at a later date, with Bear noting, "After the initial basic tracking month, a lot of things were added individually by everyone and a lot of those sounds were very time intensive. I couldn't imagine doing some of those things with everyone around, or feeling like you're on the clock at a studio."

Many of the demos for the album were what the band refers to as "sketches," done by mostly singer/guitarists Daniel Rossen and Ed Droste. "Marla" itself is actually a song written by Droste's great aunt, a failed musician. As he explained in an interview with Pitchfork Media:

Well, the whole "Marla" story of my great aunt being this failed musician that dies at an early age in the 1940s was, basically, I got this CD a few years ago from the last remaining sibling of hers, who had finally decided to transfer this stuff to disc. For me, this was the one song. Much in the way that I kind look at the "Owner of a Lonely Heart" thing-- even though that was just myself-- and see this melancholic, slower edge that I heard in it. Not that it was exactly the same because this was obviously the four of us working on it, but I took the song and said, "Look everybody, I'm not sure how we'll do this, but it will be really cool if we slowed it down and tried to give it our own spin." Luckily, everyone was really into it, but it was very much a blank page for a few days.

The string arrangements on "Marla" were composed and performed by Owen Pallett, with Christopher Bear noting that their collaboration stemmed from his contribution to the band's remix album, Horn of Plenty (The Remixes) (2005).

As Horn of Plenty was a solo effort by Droste, this record is truly the band's "debut" as it features all members contributing to the writing and production of the album.

=== Writing and composition ===
The addition of vocalist and guitarist Daniel Rossen to Grizzly Bear resulted in two primary songwriters existing within the band. Drummer Christopher Bear stated, "A lot of the songs are composed by Daniel and the way that he writes brings out another side of how the band interacts. In general, having four people with different ideas and strengths has changed our sound the most."

Regarding the album's lyrical and thematic content, Droste and bandmate Chris Taylor stated: "There is not really a theme with the lyrics but the theme of the album is us figuring out how to work together and recording in that house, which is what brought it together in that weird way." Regarding his sexuality and its influence on his lyrics, Ed Droste stated: "I kind of like vague lyrics. Sometimes they are gay, but they're not overt. A lot of the lyrics on Yellow House Dan [Rossen] wrote and 'My love's another kind' could be interpreted that way, and I think he's very open to that interpretation, too, even though he was thinking of it as something else. That's why I relate to it when I sing those lyrics, because I'll sing those parts with him on the song. I think we all are into the vague nature of it."

== Reception ==
Professional ratings
Aggregate scores
Source	Rating
Metacritic	79/100
Review scores
Source	Rating
AllMusic	5/5 stars
The Guardian	4/5 stars
Mojo	2/5 stars
Pitchfork	8.7/10
PopMatters	8/10
Q	3/5 stars
The Skinny	4/5 stars
Spin	3.5/5 stars
Uncut	4/5 stars
URB	4/5 stars

Yellow House has received universal acclaim from music critics. At Metacritic, which assigns a normalized rating out of 100 to reviews from mainstream critics, the album received an average score of 79, based on 19 reviews, which indicates "generally favorable reviews".

The album received critical acclaim from several major publications, and ranked No. 8 in Pitchfork's best albums of 2006 list, as well as a similarly high placement in the same list of the New York Times.

== Release ==
In 2012, vocalist and guitarist Daniel Rossen reflected on its release, stating, "When we finished Yellow House, we were so young and so excited about the first record we made as the four of us. We were so deep in it, it was such a special thing at that time, such a romance releasing it. I don't know if it was like that for everyone but it certainly felt like it."

The first single, "Knife", was released on 7-inch vinyl with the exclusive B-side "Easier" (alternate edit) on May 21, 2007. A music video for "Knife" was produced by Encyclopedia Pictura in 2007. A music video for "Central and Remote," directed by Jesse Graziano, was also released in 2007.

In 2009, the Warp20 (Recreated) compilation featured a cover of "Colorado" by Pivot and "Little Brother" by Jamie Lidell.

Though there is no indication on the packaging, the original vinyl pressing is intended to be played at 45 RPM.

== Track listing ==
All tracks are written by Christopher Bear, Edward Droste, Daniel Rossen, Chris Taylor, except where noted.

No.	Title	Lead vocals	Length
1.	"Easier"	Rossen	3:42
2.	"Lullabye"	Droste/Rossen	5:14
3.	"Knife"	Droste	5:14
4.	"Central and Remote"	Droste	4:54
5.	"Little Brother" (lyrics by Fred Nicolaus)	Rossen	6:24
6.	"Plans"	Droste	4:16
7.	"Marla" (co-written by Marla Forbes)	Droste	4:56
8.	"On a Neck, On a Spit"	Rossen	5:46
9.	"Reprise"	Rossen	3:20
10.	"Colorado"	Droste	6:14
Total length:			50:00

Japanese Release Bonus Track
No.	Title	Lead vocals	Length
11.	"Granny Diner"	Rossen	4:51
Total length:			54:51

== Personnel ==
The following people contributed to Yellow House:

=== Band ===
- Christopher Bear – drums, vocals, xylophone, lap steel, glockenspiel
- Edward Droste – vocals, keyboard, autoharp, guitar
- Daniel Rossen – vocals, guitars, banjo, piano, autoharp
- Chris Taylor – clarinet, flute, saxophone, vocals, keyboard, bass, electronics and treatments

Additional musicians

- G. Lucas Crane – tapes ("Plans")
- Owen Pallett – strings, string arrangements ("Marla")
- John Marshman – strings ("Marla")

Recording personnel

- Chris Taylor – producer, recording, mixing
- Chris Coady – mixing

Artwork

- Patryce Bak – photography
- Ben Tousley – design

== Song appearances ==
From 2007 to 2011, Adult Swim used several songs from Yellow House as background music for bumpers, including "Reprise", "Little Brother", "On a Neck, On a Spit", "Central and Remote", "Plans", and "Easier". "On a Neck, On a Spit" was featured on The CW show Reaper.
