= Sorry for the Delay =

EP by Grizzly Bear
- Released: April 9, 2006
- Length: 28:07
- Label: Audraglint
- Producer: Ed Droste

Grizzly Bear chronology
Horn of Plenty (The Remixes) (2005)	Sorry for the Delay (2006)	Yellow House (2006)

Professional ratings
Review scores
Source	Rating
Dusted Magazine	(favourable)
Prefix	6.0

Sorry for the Delay is a limited-release EP by American indie rock band Grizzly Bear, released on April 9, 2006 on Audraglint. Described as "seven (early) songs of sad, lo-fi pop," the EP consists of material recorded by founding member Ed Droste.

The track "Owner of a Lonely Heart" is a cover of the Yes song.

== Track listing ==
All songs written by Ed Droste except where noted.

1. "Sorry for the Delay" – 3:29
2. "Sure Thing" – 6:49
3. "A Leader Always Carries a Stick" – 4:10
4. "Particular to What?" – 4:38
5. "August March" – 3:15
6. "Owner of a Lonely Heart" (Trevor Rabin/Jon Anderson/Chris Squire/Trevor Horn) – 3:10
7. "Fragments" – 2:36

== Personnel ==
- Ed Droste - vocals, acoustic guitar, electric guitar, keyboards, drums, percussion
- Christopher Bear - drums
