= Refinery29 =

American digital media and entertainment company

- Website type: Media and entertainment
- Available in: English
- Founded: November 2005; 21 years ago
- Headquarters: 225 Broadway, New York City, U.S.
- Owner: Sundial Media Group
- Founders: Philippe von Borries; Justin Stefano; Piera Gelardi; Christene Barberich
- Employees: Over 500 (as of October 2017)
- Website: refinery29.com
- Launched: Summer 2005
- Current status: Active

Refinery29 (R29) is an American multinational digital media and entertainment website focused on young women. It is owned by Sundial Media Group. It has online editions running in the United States, Germany and France.

== History ==
Justin Stefano, Philippe von Borries, Piera Gelardi, and Christene Barberich co-founded Refinery29 in 2005 as a city guide, emphasizing fashion local to New York City. The name of the website alludes to the website distilling information into its essence. The company headquarters is located in the Financial District, Manhattan neighborhood of New York City.

Refinery29 has over 450 employees globally with offices in Los Angeles, London, and Berlin. In 2015, the company launched a UK edition at www.refinery29.uk and the following year in 2016, a German edition at www.refinery29.de. In 2016, Refinery29 announced it had raised $45 million in funding led by Turner. As of 2017, Refinery29 reaches an audience of over 500 million globally.

On October 2, 2019, Vice Media announced that it would acquire Refinery29. The deal, worth a reported $400 million, valued the combined company at $4 billion.

In March 2021, Pedestrian Group announced a multi-year deal with Vice Media and Refinery29 to become the Australian digital publishing home of both brands. A new team was announced for Refinery29 later that year.

On May 15, 2023, Vice Media formally filed for Chapter 11 bankruptcy, as part of a possible sale to a consortium of lenders including Fortress Investment Group, which will, alongside Soros Fund Management and Monroe Capital, invest $225 million as a credit bid for nearly all of its assets.

In April 2024, Sundial Media Group purchased the company. Refinery29 at the time of the sale had around 100 employees and roughly $100 million in annual revenue.

In July 2024, it was reported that Refinery29 Australia would shut down amid a restructuring at Pedestrian. In September 2025, Refinery29 closed its UK operations and laid off an unknown number of journalists. The sub-brand Unbothered also ceased its UK operations.

== Content ==
Refinery29 was listed three consecutive years on Crain's "Fast 50", has won seven Clio Awards, and seven Webby Awards.

The company produces an annual pop-up exhibition, 29Rooms, where visitors can take self-portraits for sharing on Instagram. 29Rooms was launched in 2015 on Refinery29's tenth anniversary. It has been credited as the first "selfie museum".

Notable writers for Refinery29 include Kathleen Newman-Bremang.

== Workplace culture and pay disparity ==
In early June 2020, women of color and black employees and freelancers took to social media to tell stories of discrimination while working for Refinery29. A writer for the company wrote on Twitter of "a toxic company culture" and pay disparity [between people of color and white employees].

On June 10, 2020, co-founders and CEOs Justin Stefano and Philippe von Borries released a letter addressing the controversy, which read, in part: "After having read these accounts, we recognize how our privilege as two white male CEOs created blinders that kept us from seeing the struggles, exclusion, and aggressions that you felt at R29. This is an earthquake of a wake-up call."

Co-founder Christene Barberich stepped aside as Global Editor-in-Chief, but remained an employee of Refinery29 until November 2020. In Barberich's Instagram announcement post she wrote, "I've read and taken in the raw and personal accounts of Black women and women of color regarding their experiences inside our company at Refinery29 and what's clear from these experiences, is that R29 has to change. We have to do better, and that starts with making room. And, so I will be stepping aside in my role at R29 to help diversify our leadership in editorial and ensure this brand and the people it touches can spark a new defining chapter." On June 11, 2020, author and former Refinery29 employee Sesali Bowen called Barberich a "sacrificial lamb" on Twitter. Barberich also faced criticism after a former employee recalled in 2020 that Barberich once cried in a team meeting after being told she seemed "squeamish" when discussing race. It was stated Barberich had decided to go home earlier that day due to the confrontation.
