= Veckatimest =

Studio album by Grizzly Bear
- Released: May 26, 2009
- Recorded: 2008
- Studios: Allaire, Shokan, New York
- Genres: Psychedelic folk; indie folk; chamber pop; indie rock; psychedelic pop; baroque pop
- Length: 52:02
- Label: Warp
- Producer: Chris Taylor

Grizzly Bear chronology
Friend (2007)	Veckatimest (2009)	Shields (2012)

Singles from Veckatimest
- 1. "Two Weeks" Released: June 1, 2009; 2. "While You Wait for the Others" Released: August 31, 2009; 3. "Cheerleader" Released: 2009

Veckatimest (/vɛkəˈtɪmɪst/) is the third studio album by the American rock band Grizzly Bear, released on May 26, 2009, by Warp Records. The album is named after Veckatimest Island, a small island in Dukes County, Massachusetts. Produced by bassist and multi-instrumentalist Chris Taylor, the album entered the US Billboard 200 at #8, selling 33,000 copies in its first week of release. By September 2012, the album had sold around 220,000 copies in the US. In 2010, it was awarded a gold certification from the Independent Music Companies Association which indicated sales of at least 100,000 copies throughout Europe.

== Background and recording ==
The recording of Veckatimest began in summer 2008 at Allaire Studios in the Catskill Mountains of upstate New York. Regarding the writing process, Ed Droste states:

We knew it had to be done differently because Yellow House came from pre-existing songs that either Daniel Rossen or I had written, as well as a couple that we wrote together. But we were really starting with a blank slate with Veckatimest, so there was sort of this question mark of, "Do we even know how to write together and collaborate together? How will this work?" And we were pleasantly surprised when everyone presented their ideas much earlier on in the stages of development, which allowed for a lot of other people in the band to get involved in the songs. In the past, someone presented a song and [other members would be] like, "This song is done. He wrote the parts. Let's play them."

Nico Muhly collaborated with Grizzly Bear on this album. In the interim, they debuted four new songs: "Two Weeks", "While You Wait for the Others", "Fine for Now" and "Cheerleader". They also performed "While You Wait for the Others" on Late Night with Conan O'Brien on April 21, 2008, and performed "Two Weeks" on Late Show with David Letterman on July 23, 2008. The band performed the track "Two Weeks" Live in the UK on Later... with Jools Holland on 5 May 2009

A deluxe edition of the album was released on November 2, 2009, in Europe. Along with the twelve original tracks, it contained an exclusive 24 page booklet and a bonus disc of Veckatimest tracks recorded in various locations. Although the release was exclusive to Europe, the bonus tracks were released digitally to the US in the iTunes Store.

== Releases ==
An unmastered version of the album was leaked before its release. Regarding this, Ed Droste states:

We knew it was gonna leak and we were prepared for that, but really, the biggest bummer for us was that we spent a lot of time and put a lot of effort into making sure that it's a really rich recording — recording it to tape and doing all these nice sonic details — and then it leaked and I remember listening to it and it sounded like an underwater YouTube stream or something. It was really, really bad. And so it's just a bummer to think of everyone's first impressions of this album being this horribly compressed, terrible-quality version of the album. But that said, the excitement behind it and everyone's reaction was really encouraging and exciting for us to see. I think people find their own way of showing support, whether it be through an album sale or coming to a concert or even just telling some friends about it. Obviously, the leak didn't hurt us because we debuted in the Top 10. You've gotta be sort of Zen about it.

== Packaging ==
The bonus disc cover for Veckatimest.

=== Artwork ===
The abstract drawing was created by William O'Brien and chosen by Droste, whom he has known since high school. Although the piece was not originally intended to be used as Veckatimest's artwork, O'Brien had been working on it at the same time as Grizzly Bear was working on the record. After contacting O'Brien requesting to use one of his pieces for the new album, Droste received a number of examples to choose from. Initially O'Brien was surprised Droste had chosen that specific piece for the artwork as he felt it had an "awkward placement" to it, but after hearing the album he reconsidered the piece, "it was like this amazing, beautiful thing that happened". Along with Veckatimest, O'Brien also created the artwork for the accompanying singles, and the European bonus disc. Although unclarified, it is most likely that the other artwork for the singles and bonus disc was taken from the same abstract series that spawned the Veckatimest piece as they all have a similar nature.

=== Title ===
The album's title is a reference to Veckatimest Island, a small island in Dukes County, Massachusetts and a member of the Elizabeth Islands, a chain of small islands extending southwest from the southern coast of Cape Cod, Massachusetts. Naushon Island, another member of the Elizabeth Islands, is owned by the Forbes family and Grizzly Bear's founding member, Ed Droste, is connected to the Forbes family through his mother Diana Forbes. In an interview with Pitchfork, Droste explained the title:

We were doing some recording in Cape Cod, and we were looking at some typography. We were invited to that area once, and we thought it was really beautiful. And we liked the name. We didn't camp there or anything, but we spent a lot of time there because of my grandmother's house there. So we had a chance to really explore the region, and it was an area that we thought was really pretty because it was so natural and untouched. We really enjoyed it.

== Reception and legacy ==
Professional ratings
Aggregate scores
Source	Rating
AnyDecentMusic?	8.3/10
Metacritic	85/100
Review scores
Source	Rating
AllMusic	4.5/5 stars
The A.V. Club	A
Entertainment Weekly	B+
The Guardian	4/5 stars
The Independent	4/5 stars
Los Angeles Times	3.5/4 stars
MSN Music (Consumer Guide)	C+
Pitchfork	9.0/10
Rolling Stone	3.5/5 stars
Spin	8/10

On release, Veckatimest was greeted with widespread critical acclaim, currently holding a score of 85 at the aggregate critic review site, Metacritic. The album is generally viewed by critics as a large step forward for Grizzly Bear in regards to partial genre-blending, musical complexity and experimentation.

Both "While You Wait for the Others" and "Two Weeks" appeared in Pitchfork's Top 500 Tracks of the 2000s, ranking at #334 and #162 respectively. The album was ranked #42 on their list of the decade's top 200 albums. Rhapsody called it the 8th best album of 2009. Official music videos have been produced for "Two Weeks", "While You Wait for the Others" and "Ready, Able". Veckatimest was also voted Stereogum's second best album of 2009.

Veckatimest was well-placed on many "End of the Year" lists, with Rolling Stone placing it at 21st, Spin magazine placing it at 4th and Pitchfork at 6th.

=== Jack Goes Boating and Blue Valentine ===
Many of the album's tracks appear in actor Philip Seymour Hoffman's directorial debut, Jack Goes Boating (2010), acting as the film's primary score. Hoffman noted: "Susan Jacobs the music supervisor threw Grizzly Bear my way. She was like, 'You should really listen to them!' I heard their album and I was like, 'Definitely!' There was a bunch of music from Grizzly Bear that I used, which fit so nicely."

Instrumental tracks from the album also appear in the film Blue Valentine (2010); Grizzly Bear subsequently released a soundtrack album to the film in 2011.

== Track listing ==
All tracks are written by Ed Droste, Daniel Rossen, Chris Taylor and Christopher Bear.

No.	Title	Lead vocals	Length
1.	"Southern Point"	Rossen	5:02
2.	"Two Weeks"	Droste	4:03
3.	"All We Ask"	Droste/Rossen	5:21
4.	"Fine for Now"	Rossen	5:31
5.	"Cheerleader"	Droste	4:54
6.	"Dory"	Rossen/Droste	4:26
7.	"Ready, Able"	Droste	4:17
8.	"About Face"	Droste	3:21
9.	"Hold Still"	Droste/Rossen	2:24
10.	"While You Wait for the Others"	Rossen	4:29
11.	"I Live with You"	Rossen	4:57
12.	"Foreground"	Droste	3:35

iTunes bonus track
No.	Title	Length
13.	"All We Ask" (piano demo)	3:11

Japan-only bonus track
No.	Title	Length
13.	"Untitled #6"	3:44

Deluxe edition bonus disc
No.	Title	Length
1.	"Southern Point" (KCRW Session)	5:23
2.	"All We Ask" (KCMP Session)	4:32
3.	"Ready, Able" (KCRW Session)	4:07
4.	"Foreground" (Duyster Session)	3:08
5.	"Two Weeks" (BBC Maida Vale Session)	4:04
6.	"Dory" (World Cafe Session)	3:38
7.	"While You Wait for the Others" (BBC Maida Vale Session)	4:30

== Personnel ==
The following people contributed to Veckatimest:

=== Band ===
- Daniel Rossen – vocals, guitar, keyboards, string arrangements ("I Live With You")
- Ed Droste – vocals, guitar, keyboards, omnichord
- Chris Taylor – bass guitar, woodwinds, backing vocals
- Christopher Bear – drums, backing vocals

=== Additional musicians ===
- Victoria Legrand – backing vocals ("Two Weeks")
- Brooklyn Youth Choir – backing vocals ("Cheerleader", "I Live With You", "Foreground")
- Acme String Quartet – strings ("Southern Point", "Ready, Able", "I Live With You", "Foreground")
- Nico Muhly – choral arrangements ("Cheerleader", "Foreground"), string quartet arrangements ("Southern Point", "Ready, Able", "Foreground")

=== Recording personnel ===
- Chris Taylor – producer, engineer
- Gareth Jones – co-mixing engineer
- Greg Calbi – mastering
- Steve Falone – mastering assistant

=== Artwork ===
- William J. O'Brien – drawings
- Ben Wilkerson Tousley – design
- Amelia Bauer – hand drawn text

== Charts ==
Chart (2009)	Peak position
ARIA Charts	41
Belgian Albums Chart (Flanders)	20
Belgian Albums Chart (Wallonia)	34
Dutch Albums Chart	49
French Albums Chart	73
New Zealand Albums Chart	44
Norwegian Albums Chart	14
Swedish Albums Chart	41
Swiss Albums Chart	96
UK Albums Chart	24
US Billboard 200	8
US Billboard Top Independent Albums	1
