= Horn of Plenty (The Remixes) =

Remix album by Grizzly Bear
- Released: 2005
- Length: 70:28
- Label: Kanine

Grizzly Bear chronology
| Horn of Plenty (2004) | Horn of Plenty (The Remixes) (2005) | Sorry for the Delay (2006) |

Professional ratings
Review scores
| Source | Rating |
|---|---|
| Pitchfork Media | 7.4/10 |
| Spin | B+ |

Horn of Plenty (The Remixes) is a remix album by American indie rock band Grizzly Bear, released in 2005 on Kanine Records. The album features songs from the band's debut album, Horn of Plenty (2004).

== Background ==
Regarding the decision to release a remix version of the band's debut album, Horn of Plenty (2004), drummer Christopher Bear stated, "The remixes for Horn of Plenty started because Kanine was going to re-release the album with better distribution but need some sort of "bonus" to make it happen. It was kind of Ed's pet project. He basically just emailed a lot of people and luckily most of them were down to do it. Everyone was very gracious for participating. [...] It is a fun way to think about music."

== Track listing ==
| No. | Title | Length |
|---|---|---|
| 1. | "Campfire (Efterklang Remix)" | 4:04 |
| 2. | "Merge (Dntel Remix)" | 3:38 |
| 3. | "A Good Place (The Soft Pink Truth's Blow By Blow Remix)" | 4:51 |
| 4. | "Eavesdropping (Simon Bookish Remix)" | 4:48 |
| 5. | "Don't Ask (Alpha Remix)" | 4:41 |
| 6. | "Fix It (Solex's Foxy Remix)" | 2:54 |
| 7. | "Deep Sea Diver (The Bomarr Monk Remix)" | 3:09 |
| 8. | "Shift (Son Remix)" | 2:48 |
| 9. | "Showcase (Phiiliip's Overflowing Trophy Case Remix)" | 4:43 |
| 10. | "La Duchesse Anne (Safety Scissors Extra Towels Remix)" | 5:21 |
| 11. | "Service Bell (Black Moustache Remix)" | 3:37 |
| 12. | "This Song (Dr. Cuerpo of The Double Remix)" | 4:22 |
| 13. | "Disappearing Act (Ariel Pink Remix)" | 4:21 |
| 14. | "Campfire (Hisham Bharoocha & Rusty Santos Remix)" | 3:29 |
| 15. | "Don't Ask (Final Fantasy Remix)" | 3:30 |
| 16. | "Shift (Circlesquare Remix)" | 6:59 |
| 17. | "Deep Sea Diver (Castanets Remix)" | 3:13 |
| Total length: | | 66:68 |
