= Plenty of Horn =

Plenty of Horn may refer to:

- Plenty of Horn (Paul Horn album), 1958
- Plenty of Horn (Ted Curson album), 1961

== See also ==
- Horn of Plenty (disambiguation)
