= You Belong There =

Studio album by Daniel Rossen
- Released: April 8, 2022
- Genre: Chamber folk; folk rock; baroque-folk; chamber pop; folk-pop
- Length: 44:24
- Label: Warp
- Producer: Daniel Rossen

Daniel Rossen chronology
Silent Hour/Golden Mile (2012)	You Belong There (2022)

Singles from You Belong There
- 1. "Shadow in the Frame" Released: January 20, 2022; 2. "Unpeopled Space" Released: February 22, 2022

Professional ratings
Aggregate scores
Source	Rating
AnyDecentMusic?	8.0/10
Metacritic	84/100
Review scores
Source	Rating
AllMusic	4/5 stars
Beats Per Minute	74%
Clash	7/10
DIY	3.5/5 stars
Mojo	4/5 stars
MusicOMH	5/5 stars
Pitchfork	7.5/10
Record Collector	4/5 stars
Uncut	9/10
Under the Radar	8/10

You Belong There is the debut studio album by American singer-songwriter Daniel Rossen, released on April 8, 2022, by Warp Records. The album was announced on January 20, 2022 and was supported by two singles.

== Track listing ==
All tracks are written by Daniel Rossen.

You Belong There track listing
No.	Title	Length
1.	"It's a Passage"	3:58
2.	"Shadow in the Frame"	5:16
3.	"You Belong There"	2:39
4.	"Unpeopled Space"	6:09
5.	"Celia"	2:39
6.	"Tangle"	3:46
7.	"I'll Wait for Your Visit"	6:53
8.	"Keeper and Kin"	6:09
9.	"The Last One"	3:58
10.	"Repeat the Pattern"	3:01
Total length:		44:28

Japanese edition (bonus tracks)
No.	Title	Length
11.	"Up on High"	3:56
12.	"Silent Song"	4:41
13.	"Return to Form"	5:23
14.	"Saint Nothing"	4:50
15.	"Golden Mile"	4:17
Total length:		67:43

== Charts ==
Chart performance for You Belong There
Chart (2022)	Peak position
Scottish Albums (OCC)	34
UK Album Downloads (OCC)	41
UK Independent Albums (OCC)	17
