= Horn of Plenty (Grizzly Bear album) =

Studio album by Grizzly Bear
- Released: November 9, 2004
- Genres: Lo-fi; psychedelic folk
- Length: 48:43
- Label: Kanine
- Producer: Ed Droste

Grizzly Bear chronology
Horn of Plenty (2004)	Horn of Plenty (The Remixes) (2005)

Professional ratings
Review scores
Source	Rating
AllMusic	4/5 stars
NOW Magazine	NNNN
Spin	(B+) link
Stylus Magazine	(B+) link
PlayLouder	link
Pitchfork Media	(7.7/10)

Horn of Plenty is the debut studio album by American rock band Grizzly Bear, released on November 9, 2004, by Kanine Records. Primarily a solo album by founding member Edward Droste, the album also features contributions from future drummer Christopher Bear. In 2006, the band released an EP, Sorry for the Delay, featuring tracks recorded during the same time period.

In 2005, a collection of remixes, Horn of Plenty (The Remixes), was released.

== Background ==
In 2002, Ed Droste began writing and recording material under the moniker Grizzly Bear, following a painful break-up. Droste subsequently wrote and recorded Horn of Plenty, and subsequent EP, Sorry for the Delay, for "catharsis" and recorded it for friends. Horn of Plenty was originally released by Droste as CD-R in 2003 before being officially released through Kanine with a revised tracklisting a year later.

In 2006, Droste noted that he and Bear:

wrote the songs together [...] and my recording technique was also very untrained, so I was doing a lot of really crazy things with vocals which is kinda' why they all sound so fucked up and lo-fi. Everyone was like "So, you must be a really big fan of lo-fi bands A, B, C, etc.," but actually I just didn’t know that much about microphones, and everyone thought it was this real deliberate thing. I was just totally an idiot, getting the levels all wrong, and just like lowering them in other zones and it would be really high pickup on one zone so it would be weird. I dunno', we went in there and tried to fix as much as we could because before it was even more screwed up sounding, it was crazy.

Regarding his contributions to the album, drummer and backing vocalist Christopher Bear stated, "I basically came into Grizzly Bear after [the album] was already finished. I helped Ed tie up some loose ends with Horn of Plenty, but that record was pretty much all him."

== Track listing ==
No.	Title	Length
1.	"Deep Sea Diver"	4:47
2.	"Don't Ask"	3:28
3.	"Alligator"	1:23
4.	"Campfire"	4:13
5.	"Shift"	2:19
6.	"Disappearing Act"	4:24
7.	"Fix It"	3:46
8.	"Merge"	2:24
9.	"A Good Place"	3:18
10.	"Showcase"	4:50
11.	"La Duchesse Anne"	4:20
12.	"Eavesdropping"	3:51
13.	"Service Bell"	2:00
14.	"This Song"	3:39
Total length:		48:43

== Personnel ==
- Ed Droste - vocals, acoustic guitar, electric guitar, bass guitar, keyboards, piano, percussion
- Christopher Bear - drums, composition, vocals (track 6)
- Jared Barron - drums (tracks 4 and 11)
- Jamie Reeder - violin (track 12)
- Artwork: Edward Droste, Jordan Mattos, Josh Faught, Patryce Bak
