= Daniel Rossen =

American singer-songwriter

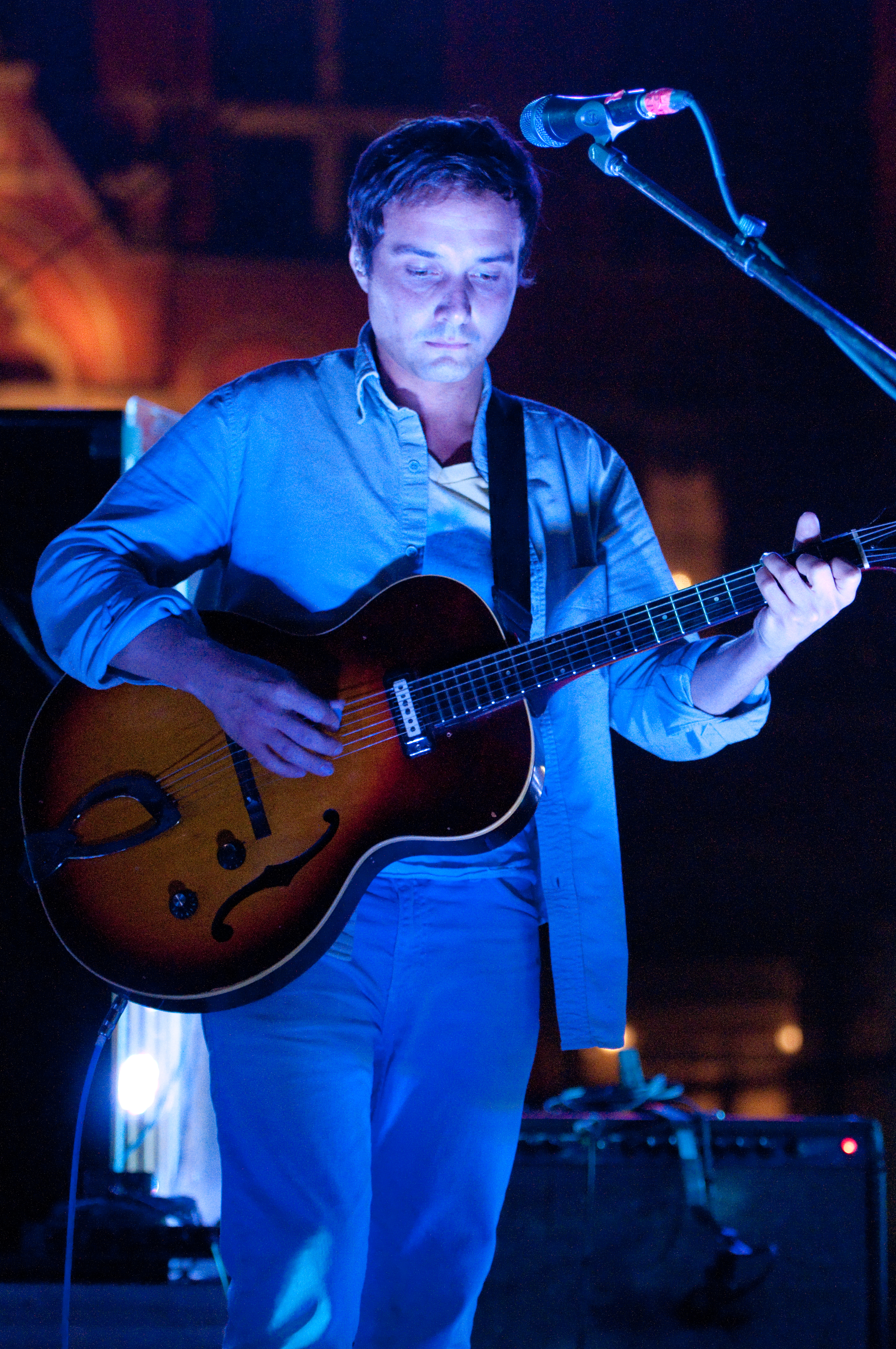
- Rossen performing with Grizzly Bear in 2012

Background information
- Born: Daniel Raphael Rossen; August 5, 1982 (age 44); Los Angeles, California, U.S.
- Genres: Indie folk; indie rock
- Occupations: Singer-songwriter; musician
- Instruments: Vocals; guitar; keyboards
- Years active: 2000–present
- Label: Warp
- Member of: Department of Eagles; Grizzly Bear
- Website: danielrossen.com

Daniel Raphael Rossen (born August 5, 1982) is an American singer, songwriter and multi-instrumentalist. He is best known as the guitarist and co-lead vocalist of the indie rock band Grizzly Bear, with whom he has recorded four studio albums. Rossen is also one half of the duo Department of Eagles with Fred Nicolaus.

Rossen released his debut solo album, You Belong There, in 2022, which was preceded by an EP, Silent Hour/Golden Mile (2012), ten years earlier.

Rossen and his Grizzly Bear bandmate Christopher Bear composed the music for the 2023 Academy Award-nominated film, Past Lives. That same year, he scored the music for Ethan Berger film, The Line.

== Early life ==
Originally from Los Angeles, Rossen moved to attend New York University. Rossen is the grandchild of filmmaker Robert Rossen.

== Career ==
As a student at the university, Rossen formed the Department of Eagles with roommate Fred Nicolaus in 2001. The duo then released two 7" singles and an album, The Whitey on the Moon UK, on Isota Records.

Rossen concurrently went on to join Grizzly Bear in 2005. He joined the group for their second album, Yellow House.

Department of Eagles released their second record In Ear Park in October 2008. The album featured fellow Grizzly Bear bandmates Chris Taylor and Christopher Bear of Grizzly Bear, with Taylor co-producing. The album was dedicated to Rossen's late father, with whom Rossen shared memories of going to the titular park.

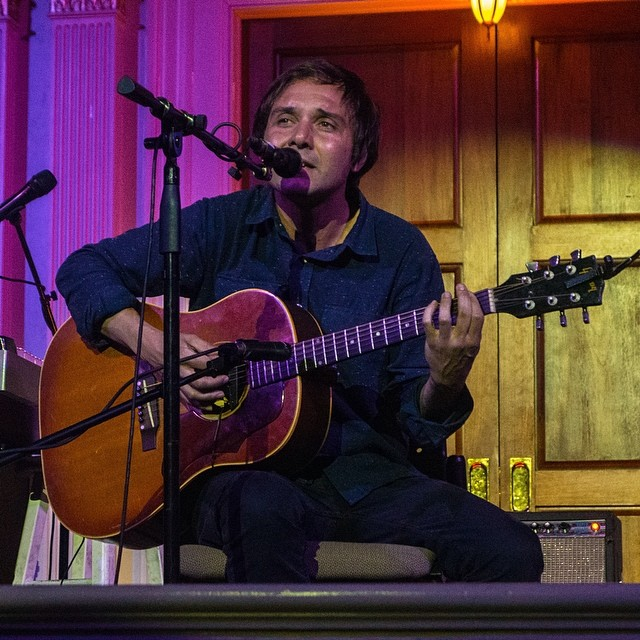
Rossen performing in 2014

In 2012, Rossen released a solo EP, Silent Hour/Golden Mile. Rossen would embark on a belated tour for the EP in 2014 due to commitments to Grizzly Bear's fourth album, Shields, released the same year as the EP. Rossen released the 12" single Deerslayer for Record Store Day 2018, though the song has been in circulation since his 2014 solo tour, and was quietly released in 2017 via his website.

In 2019, Rossen would tease songs for a potential debut solo album on his Instagram page. Again in 2021, Rossen continued to tease work on the album through Instagram, with Christopher Bear confirming his involvement via his own Instagram.

Rossen in 2020 performed an untitled song for Vote Ready, a livestream concert, which featured music from Bear, though also in a solo performance. Rossen appeared on the fourth Fleet Foxes album, Shore, contributing to its penultimate track, once again with Bear who contributed drums and percussion to all but five tracks of the album.

On January 20, 2022, Rossen announced his debut solo album You Belong There, released on April 8, 2022, supported by a solo tour of North America and Europe. Rossen and Bear also composed the music for the 2023 film Past Lives.

== Discography ==
=== Solo ===
Studio albums

- You Belong There (2022)

Live albums

- Live in Pioneertown & Santa Fe (2023)

EPs

- Silent Hour/Golden Mile EP (2012)

Soundtracks

- Past Lives (soundtrack) (2023) (With Chris Bear)

Singles

- "Deerslayer" (2018 exclusive single for Record Store Day)

=== With Grizzly Bear ===
- Yellow House (2006)
- Friend EP (2007)
- Veckatimest (2009)
- Shields (2012)
- Shields: B-Sides (2013)
- Painted Ruins (2017)

=== With Department of Eagles ===
- The Whitey on the Moon UK LP (2003) / *The Cold Nose (2005 UK reissue of The Whitey on the Moon UK LP)
- In Ear Park (2008)
