= Grizzly Bear (band) =

American rock band

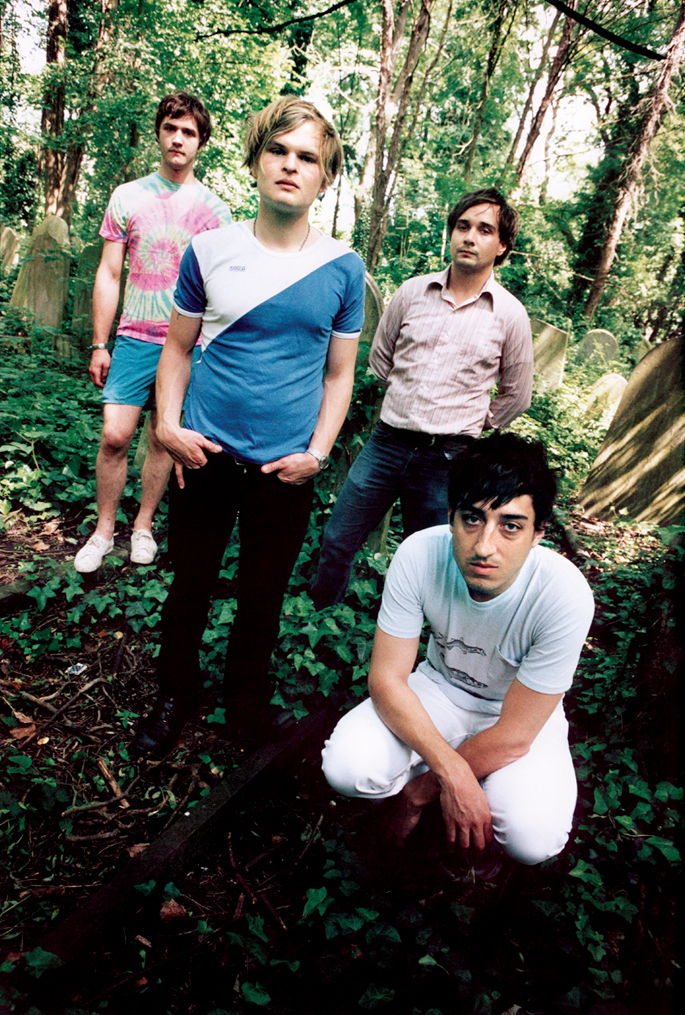
- Grizzly Bear in 2006

Background information
- Origin: Brooklyn, New York, U.S.
- Genres: Indie rock; indie folk; art rock; chamber pop; psychedelic folk
- Years active: 2002–present (Hiatus: 2019–2025)
- Labels: Kanine; Warp; RCA
- Members: Ed Droste; Daniel Rossen; Chris Taylor; Christopher Bear
- Website: grizzly-bear.net

Grizzly Bear is an American rock band from Brooklyn, New York, formed in 2002. For most of its tenure, the band has consisted of Edward Droste (vocals, keyboards, guitar), Daniel Rossen (vocals, guitar, banjo, keyboards), Chris Taylor (bass, backing vocals, woodwinds, production), and Christopher Bear (drums, percussion, backing vocals). The band have employed both traditional and electronic instruments, and their sound has been categorized as chamber pop, psychedelic folk, and art rock. The band is also known for their use of vocal harmony, with all four members contributing vocals and lead vocals alternating between Rossen and Droste.

Initially a solo project for Droste, the first Grizzly Bear album, Horn of Plenty (2004), was a lo-fi studio project released on Kanine Records. The album featured drumming contributions from Bear, who would go on to join the project full-time in 2004. The duo then enlisted both Taylor and Rossen, originally strictly for live performances. Performing as a four-piece, however, the resulting chemistry turned Grizzly Bear into a band of equal collaborators, with Rossen becoming its co-lead vocalist and second principal songwriter and Taylor adopting the role of producer and multi-instrumentalist. The band's second studio album, Yellow House, was released to widespread critical acclaim in 2006 and was the first to feature the full Grizzly Bear band.

Preceded by the single "Two Weeks", the band's third studio album, Veckatimest (2009), increased their exposure significantly, reaching No. 8 on the Billboard 200 and selling over 220,000 copies. After extensive touring, the band reconvened for the more experimental and expansive album, Shields, which was released to further acclaim in 2012. The band's fifth studio album, Painted Ruins, was released in 2017. Following the album's accompanying tour, the band entered an extended hiatus, with Droste announcing that he had left the band in 2020.

In May 2025, the band announced a US tour with all four members, alongside a message confirming that the band "never broke up."

== History ==
=== 2002–2005: Beginnings, Horn of Plenty and expansion into a full band ===
Grizzly Bear began as a moniker for songwriter Ed Droste's music in the early 2000s. Regarding the band's origins as a solo project, Droste noted, "It was just like doing a little home project, and I thought 'oh, this is fun, I'm just going to call this stuff Grizzly Bear.' [...] Our name was actually just a nickname for an old boyfriend of mine."

In 2004, Droste released Grizzly Bear's debut album, Horn of Plenty. Predominately a solo album, the album featured contributions from future drummer Christopher Bear. Rolling Stone magazine wrote of the first album, "the pure atmospheric power of the songs is more than enough to hypnotize."

Droste and Bear were subsequently joined by bass guitarist and producer Chris Taylor, and performed four shows together as a three-piece. Regarding these shows, Droste noted, "We've never played without the four of us, really. The first couple shows we did before we knew Dan [Rossen], we did with three of us and they kind of sucked. From the get-go, when we were trying to put together a live show, that's when we discovered our sound and that's why I think that was the beginning of the band."

Guitarist and vocalist Daniel Rossen, a friend of Bear's from jazz-camp, joined the band soon after. Rossen stated, "For a long time, I only played my songs to close friends; and it just happened that I lived with Chris Taylor during my second year of college, so he heard them. He was my entrance into Grizzly Bear. He joined the band first, then after a while he suggested I come in with these songs. [...] When I joined, I did about two rehearsals with them, worked out one of my songs to put into the set, then a week later we were out on the road for a two-month tour. It was a real trial-by-fire thing. I was close with Chris and Chris [Bear], but I didn’t know Ed [Droste] at all; it was weird getting to know a stranger by spending all day in the same car."

Regarding the decision to turn Grizzly Bear into a full band, Droste noted: "I was quite happy to relinquish the idea of being a solo artist. I hate the thought of being under a spotlight with my guitar, mumbling into a microphone. It's horribly scary to me."

In 2005, The Remixes, a collection of remixed songs from Horn of Plenty, was released by Kanine Records. Contributors include Simon Bookish, Final Fantasy, Soft Pink Truth, DNTEL, Efterklang, and Ariel Pink.

=== 2006–2007: Yellow House ===
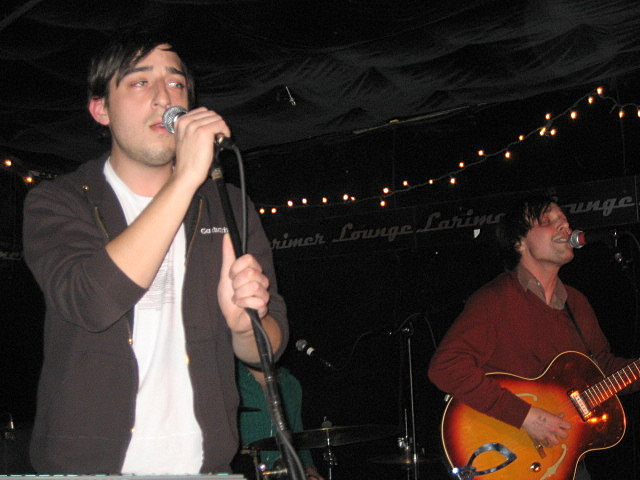
Droste (left) and Rossen (right) performing with Grizzly Bear in February 2007

Their first record as a quartet and to feature material written by Rossen, Yellow House, was released on Warp Records in September 2006. It was named for Droste's mother's house where it was recorded and ranked as one of the top albums of 2006 by The New York Times and Pitchfork. In 2007, Rossen recorded a cover of JoJo's single "Too Little Too Late" for Droste's twenty-ninth birthday. Also in 2007, the band released Friend, an EP which features outtakes, alternate versions of songs, and covers of Grizzly Bear material done by Cansei de Ser Sexy (CSS), Band of Horses, and Atlas Sound. In addition, members of the Dirty Projectors and Beirut collaborated with the band on "Alligator" and the EP's hidden track.

=== 2008–2010: Veckatimest ===
In summer of 2008, Grizzly Bear opened for Radiohead on the second leg of their North American tour. In Toronto, on their last date of the tour together, Radiohead guitarist Jonny Greenwood spoke of his love for Grizzly Bear, on stage, calling them his favorite band. Of the experience, Taylor has commented: “It was shocking, and kind of unbelievable. It still is unbelievable. Opening for Radiohead was a huge honor for us, as a band and as individuals. We’ve all had long-term relationships with Radiohead’s music, so we didn’t want to take that opportunity for granted, and do anything less than the best we could." Christopher has also commented that it "was like a dream."

The group then convened at a house on Cape Cod to solidify their third full-length album, Veckatimest, which released in May 2009 and was named "after a tiny, uninhabited island on Cape Cod that the band visited and was inspired by, particularly liking its Native American name." Upon release the album reached No. 8 on the US Billboard 200 chart, and met with widespread critical acclaim. Chris Bear has noted that compared to Yellow House, the 2009 release Veckatimest is more of an accessible pop record. He said: "I think that it’s kinda clearer, clearer equals more accessible I feel like clearer equals more accessible in general as a rule." Veckatimest made many Top Album lists for 2009 (No. 1 Wall Street Journal, No. 6 Pitchfork, No. 6 New York Times, No. 8 Time).

In 2009 Grizzly Bear played at the Brooklyn Academy of Music on February 28 with Owen Pallett, backed by an orchestra arranged by Nico Muhly and conducted by Michael Christie. They played new songs from Veckatimest as well as songs from Yellow House. Ed Droste has stated that many songs (such as "Central and Remote", "Reprise" and "Campfire") will not be played again unless backed by an orchestra. In March 2009, they played two showcases at South by Southwest Festival in Austin, Texas. In July 2009, they played at the Pitchfork Music Festival in Chicago, Illinois.

In 2009, Grizzly Bear collaborated with singer Victoria Legrand on the song "Slow Life" for The Twilight Saga: New Moon. The song is featured in the film as Bella sees an illusion of Edward underwater.

=== 2011–2014: Shields ===
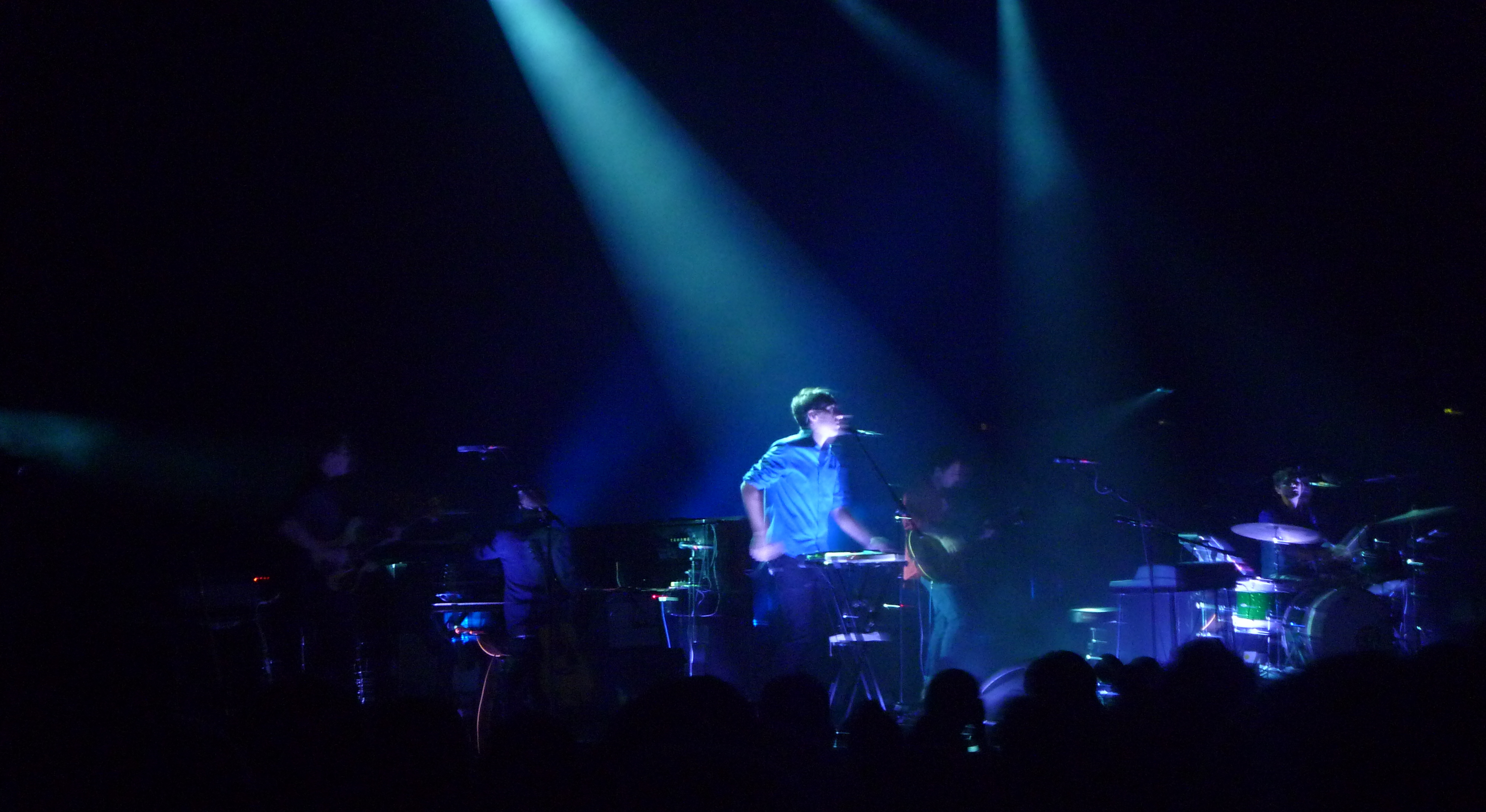
Grizzly Bear in 2012 at the Brixton Academy

In March 2012, Daniel Rossen released a solo EP, Silent Hour/Golden Mile, consisting of tracks he had written for the band's forthcoming album, but were not used.

On June 5, 2012, the song "Sleeping Ute" from their then-untitled upcoming studio album was posted on the band's website, along with the album's track listing. The band also announced tour dates in conjunction with the release of the song, which coincided with the release date of the album. On July 9, 2012, the band revealed the album's title to be Shields.

On September 4, 2012, the album leaked on the internet. Then on September 10, the album was available for an early listen via the NPR website.

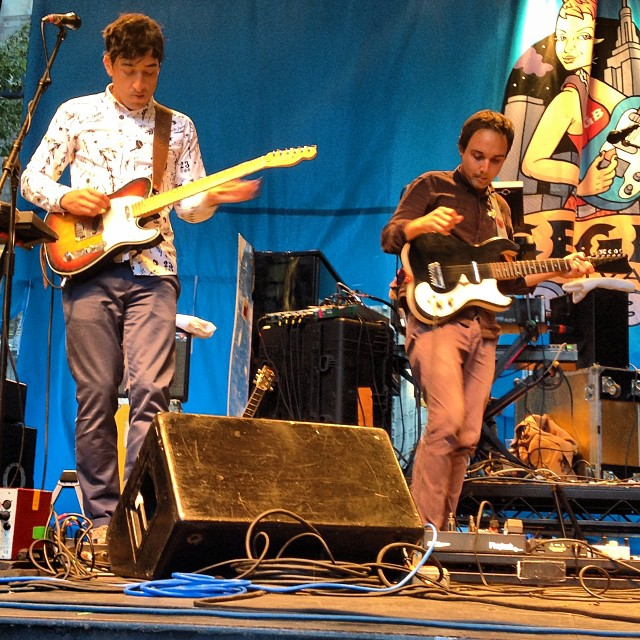
Grizzly Bear performing at the 2013 CBGB Festival in Times Square

Grizzly Bear was scheduled to headline and curated ATP's I'll Be Your Mirror festival at Alexandra Palace in London, UK on May 5, 2013. However, after the event was initially postponed to November 2013, I'll Be Your Mirror was cancelled in August due to "problems with the venue and new date".

On September 17, 2013, the track "Will Calls (Marfa Demo)" was debuted, together with the announcement of two expanded Shields re-releases, followed by the song "Listen and Wait (Bonus Track)" on October 30. The re-releases, Shields: Expanded and Shields: B-sides, were released on November 11, 2013 and include eight B-side remixes, five unreleased songs, and three remixes sold in two formats: a two-CD set and 12" 180 grams (6.3 oz) vinyl.

In January 2014, Grizzly Bear closed out their international Shields tour with a sold-out performance at the Sydney Opera House. The performance was streamed live internationally on YouTube.

=== 2015–2019: Painted Ruins ===
Following the completion of the Shields tour, Daniel Rossen embarked upon a solo tour performing tracks from his debut EP, and his other band, Department of Eagles. During the tour, Rossen commented on the future of Grizzly Bear, stating: "We don't have a clear plan. We tend to like to let the records come together naturally. I think everyone wants a little bit of a break and everyone's scattered around the globe. I think towards the end of the year, if it feels natural, we'll start again." In a more recent interview with Rolling Stone magazine, singer Ed Droste explained that a new album was in the works. Unlike the recording process for Shields, where Grizzly Bear ensconced themselves at studios in Marfa, Texas and Cape Cod, Massachusetts to construct a truly collaborative album, Droste says the creative process was "more fractured." While two members still live in New York, the other half, including Droste, have traded coasts and now reside in Los Angeles. As of June 2016, Droste had been working on the next album with the rest of Grizzly Bear.

On April 4, 2017, Grizzly Bear posted a short video clip to their website and Instagram account—presumably a demo or sample from their upcoming album. Later, they uploaded a number of clips (all brief and without lyrics) with increasing frequency. On May 5, 2017, the song "Three Rings" was released onto Vevo. Soon after, on May 17, 2017, a new single, "Mourning Sound" was released, and a new album was announced titled Painted Ruins. As promotion, a third track "Four Cypresses" was released onto the band's Vevo on June 23, 2017. A fourth promotion single was released on July 21, 2017, titled "Neighbors".

On August 18, 2017 Painted Ruins was released to positive reviews. The album was followed by a music video for the track "Losing All Sense," released onto the band's Vevo on September 28, 2017, featuring actresses Busy Philipps and Freckle.

=== 2020–2025: Extended hiatus ===
In 2020, Ed Droste confirmed that he had departed from the band and had enrolled in school to become a therapist. His departure was not announced publicly, but was confirmed during a podcast appearance in 2020. Discussing his departure from the band in November 2023, Droste noted: "I guess the decision came when I realized I didn't like the lifestyle in the band, which wasn't sustainable for me. I wasn't feeling healthy anymore, and so I just decided to try something new. [...] It was just difficult at the end for me and a bit of it was losing its luster, I suppose. And never say never. There's no official breakup or anything. I'm just doing this for now and who knows what'll happen in the future."

Daniel Rossen and Chris Bear continued to work together closely during the band's hiatus. At first collaborating with Fleet Foxes on the track "Cradling Mother, Cradling Woman" from their 2020 album, Shore. Rossen released his debut solo album, You Belong There, in April 2022, which featured significant contributions from Bear throughout. The pair composed the soundtrack to the 2023 film, Past Lives, which was nominated for Best Picture at the 96th Academy Awards. The film's soundtrack was released on A24 Music.

In an interview promoting You Belong There, Rossen confirmed that Grizzly Bear is currently on hiatus. "There's no official line here," Rossen said. "I still work closely with Chris Bear, I still talk with Chris Taylor fairly often — he lives in Spain now. Ed and I are still in contact, but he needs a little distance from us for personal reasons. He's pursuing a different career. We may do something again. When those [Painted Ruins] tours ended, I was about to have a child, Chris Taylor just had his son, Chris Bear has a family, he was pursuing other work. It made sense to have a break there to do other things. We've always taken time between records. I don't know what the future holds. I think for now it's safe to say we're inactive, but I'm very reluctant to make some grand statement like, 'We've broken up!' I don't trust that, especially because people come back together again. I think it's entirely possible that we could, I just don't know."

Rossen elaborated in a further interview: "I think where we are now is just a very natural — you know, Grizzly Bear, I joined that band at the end of 2004, so you consider how long that was. The stretch that we were active was like 14 years. And I think if anything it’s just like, people change, lives change. I really respect bands and artists that can keep it together forever, but I think we all just wanted to do some different things with our lives for a little bit. That doesn’t mean the band’s over. It’s not. There’s no official line on that. We’re not broken up or anything. It’s just, you know, Ed is pursuing a different career. He went back to school. He wanted to do that. He was having not the most productive time on the road. It was not great for him. It wasn’t really great for any of us by the end, honestly. It was just… we wanted to do something different." In November 2023, Ed Droste suggested that the band could regroup in the future: "It's not a destroyed entity. It can easily come back and exist if the time is right and the mood is right."

=== 2025–present: Renewed activity and a return to performing ===
After a six-year hiatus from band activities, Grizzly Bear announced their return on May 27, 2025, with all four members — Ed Droste, Daniel Rossen, Chris Taylor and Chris Bear — participating in an eleven-date US tour across October and November 2025. The band's return was announced with the following statement: "Because Grizzly Bear never broke up, their first shows in six years are not a reunion. They are a simultaneous point of arrival and departure, their next destination still unknown."

== Philanthropy ==
In 2009, Grizzly Bear contributed "Service Bell" (with Feist) and "Deep Blue Sea" to the AIDS benefit album Dark Was the Night produced by the Red Hot Organization. That same year they also released a charity T-shirt via the Yellow Bird Project, to raise money for the Brighter Planet Foundation.

== Members ==
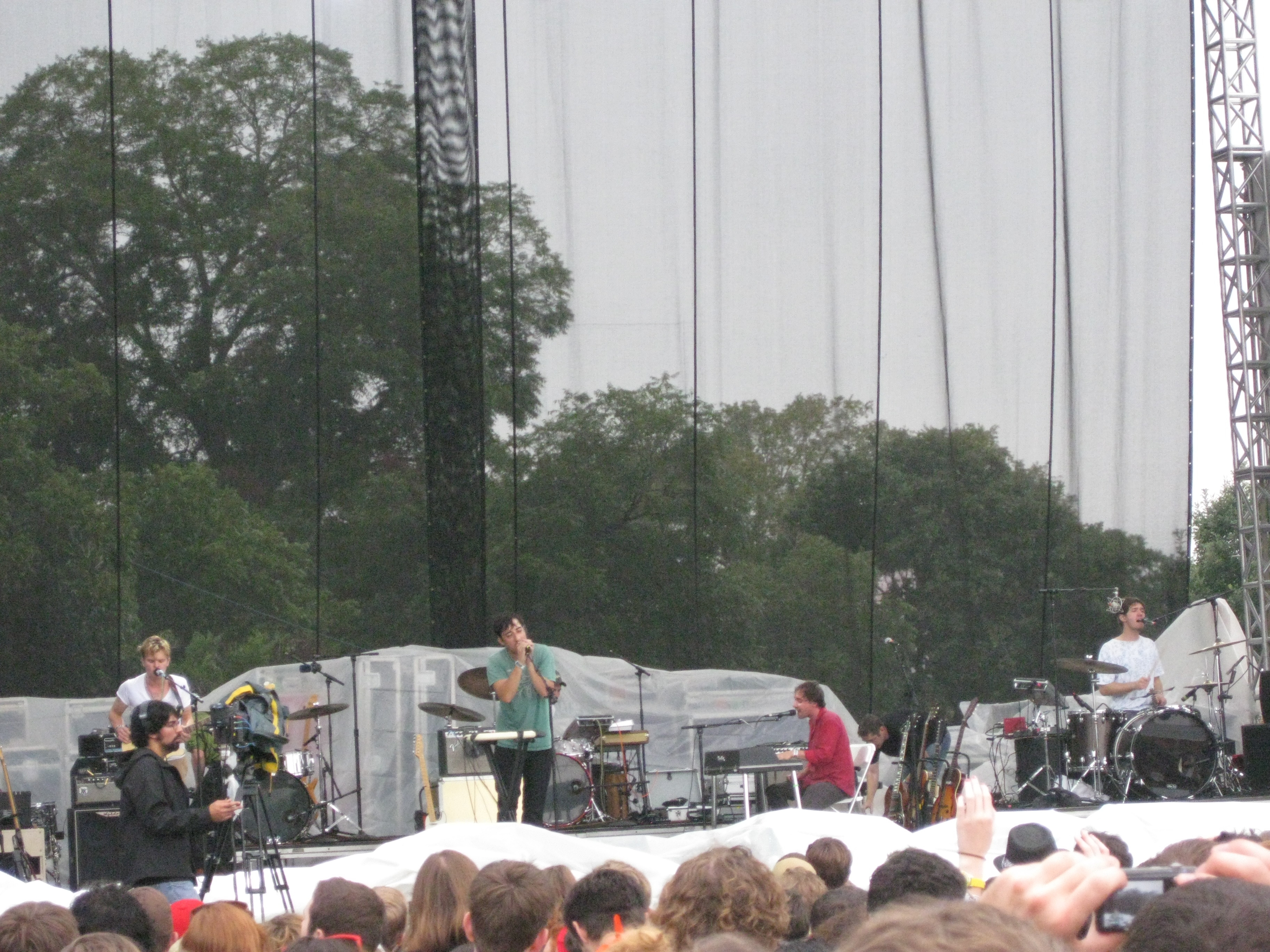
L to R: Chris Taylor, Ed Droste, Daniel Rossen, Christopher Bear at the Austin City Limits Music Festival

- Ed Droste – lead vocals, keyboards, guitar, omnichord, autoharp (2002–present)
- Christopher Bear – drums, percussion, glockenspiel, xylophone, keyboards, lap steel guitar, backing vocals (2004–present)
- Chris Taylor – bass guitar, backing vocals, whistling, keyboards, wind instruments, producer (2004–present)
- Daniel Rossen – lead vocals, guitars, keyboards, autoharp, banjo, whistling (2004–present)

Touring members

- Aaron Arntz - keyboards, trumpet (2012–2014; 2017–2019; 2025)

== Discography ==
Studio albums

- Horn of Plenty (2004)
- Yellow House (2006)
- Veckatimest (2009)
- Shields (2012)
- Painted Ruins (2017)
