= Ed Droste =

American musician

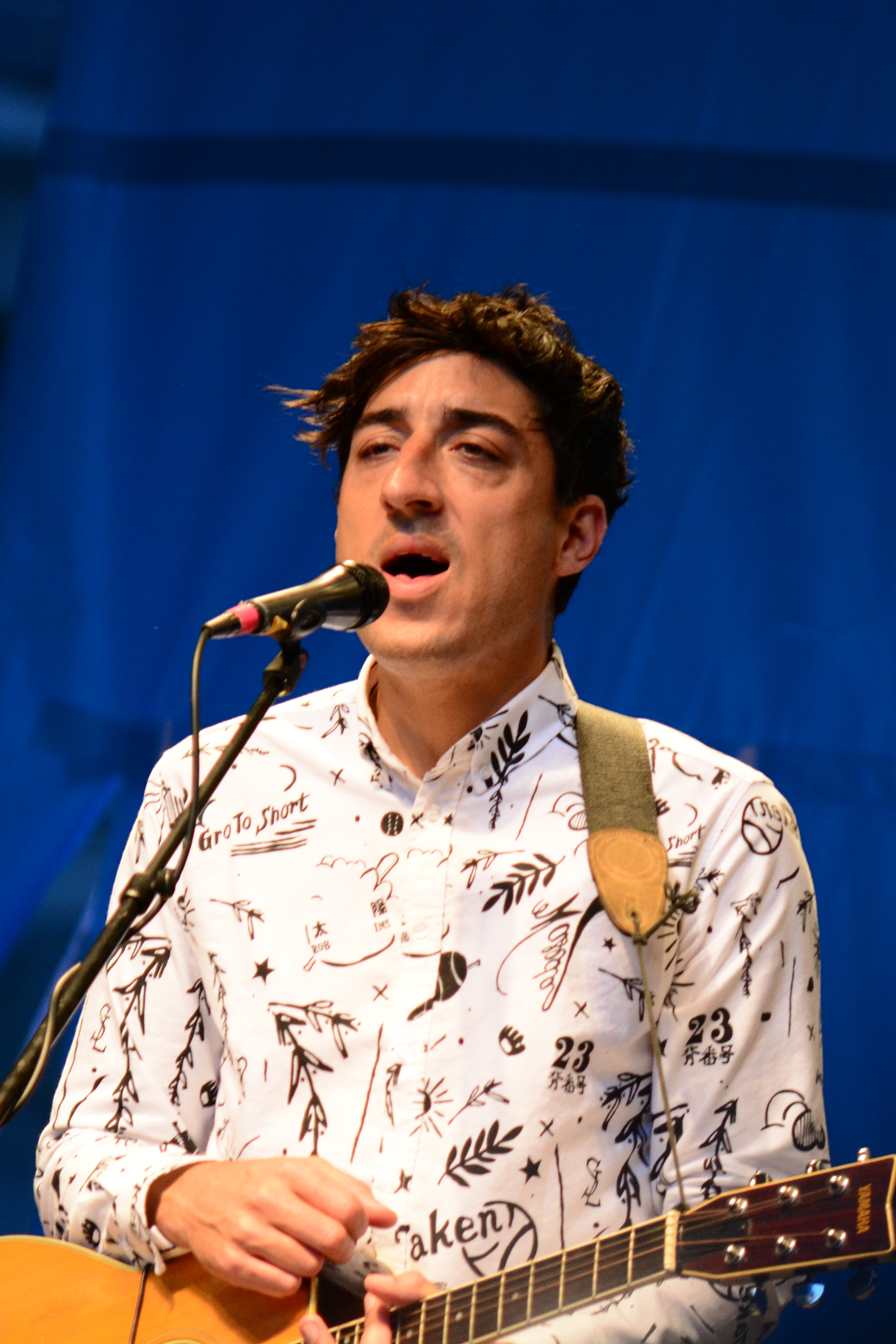
- Droste performing in 2013

Background information
- Born: Edward Droste; October 22, 1978 (age 47); Massachusetts, U.S.
- Genres: Indie rock; indie folk
- Occupations: Singer; songwriter; musician
- Instruments: Vocals; guitar; keyboards
- Years active: 2002–2020, 2025–present
- Formerly of: Grizzly Bear

Edward Droste (born October 22, 1978) is an American singer-songwriter, licensed therapist, and musician, best known for founding the rock band Grizzly Bear. The group began as the solo effort of Droste with the release of 2004's Horn of Plenty, originally released on Kanine Records. All songs were written and performed by Droste. By 2005, the group expanded into a four-piece, with Droste still as a contributing songwriter.

== Early life ==
Droste was born in Massachusetts, the son of Diana (née Forbes) and Bruce F. Droste. His maternal grandfather was conductor and musicologist Elliot Forbes. Through his mother's Forbes line, he is related to singer China Forbes.

He attended elementary school at Shady Hill School in Cambridge, Massachusetts, where his mother is a music teacher, and high school at Concord Academy in Concord, Massachusetts. He attended high school with Refinery29 founder Philippe von Borries. He attended Hampshire College for one year in 1999 before transferring to and graduating from New York University's Gallatin School of Individualized Study in 2003.

== Career ==
Droste began composing and performing songs on a solo basis as Grizzly Bear, releasing the album Horn of Plenty in 2004, with some contributions from drummer Christopher Bear. The two then joined with Chris Taylor, and eventually Daniel Rossen, to form the current four-piece band.

In a 2020 episode of Lunch Therapy, Droste announced that he left Grizzly Bear to become a therapist.

In 2023, Droste started his own independent practice as an associate therapist in Los Angeles.

Although in May 2025 the band announced a U.S. tour with all four members, they added in the press release that "Because Grizzly Bear never broke up, their first shows in six years are not a reunion," confirming upcoming concerts later that year and announcing that the band with Droste had been on longterm hiatus rather than disbanded.

== Other musical collaborations ==
- April 2007 – Edward appeared as a guest vocalist on "To a Fault" from Dntel's fourth album, Dumb Luck, released on Sub Pop Records.
- September 2007 – Edward sang with Beirut in the video for their song "Cliquot" for La Blogothèque's video series.
- March 2008 – Edward joined Owen Pallett to cover Björk's "Possibly Maybe" for Stereogum's tribute to Björk's album, Post.
- February 2011 – Edward collaborated on the song "I'm Losing Myself" with Fleet Foxes frontman Robin Pecknold in Los Angeles.
- May 2016 – Edward and Little Joy's Binki Shapiro collaborated on a cover of the Grateful Dead song "Loser" for the Grateful Dead tribute album Day of the Dead.
- July 15, 2016 – Edward appeared as a guest at Montreux Jazz Festival to cover "Go" with Woodkid
- April 2017 – Edward collaborated on the duet "Faultline" with singer DEDE and producers Kingdom and Tim K on the label Fresh Selects
- June 2019 – Fresh Selects releases a remix of DEDE and Ed's duet "Faultline" by Honey Dijon and Tim K
- October 2020 - Featured on the single "For the Sky" by Haerts

== Personal life ==
Droste came out as gay when he was 21 years old. He was married from 2011 to 2014.

Droste has mentioned his struggles with tinnitus on several occasions.
