= Christopher Bear =

American drummer

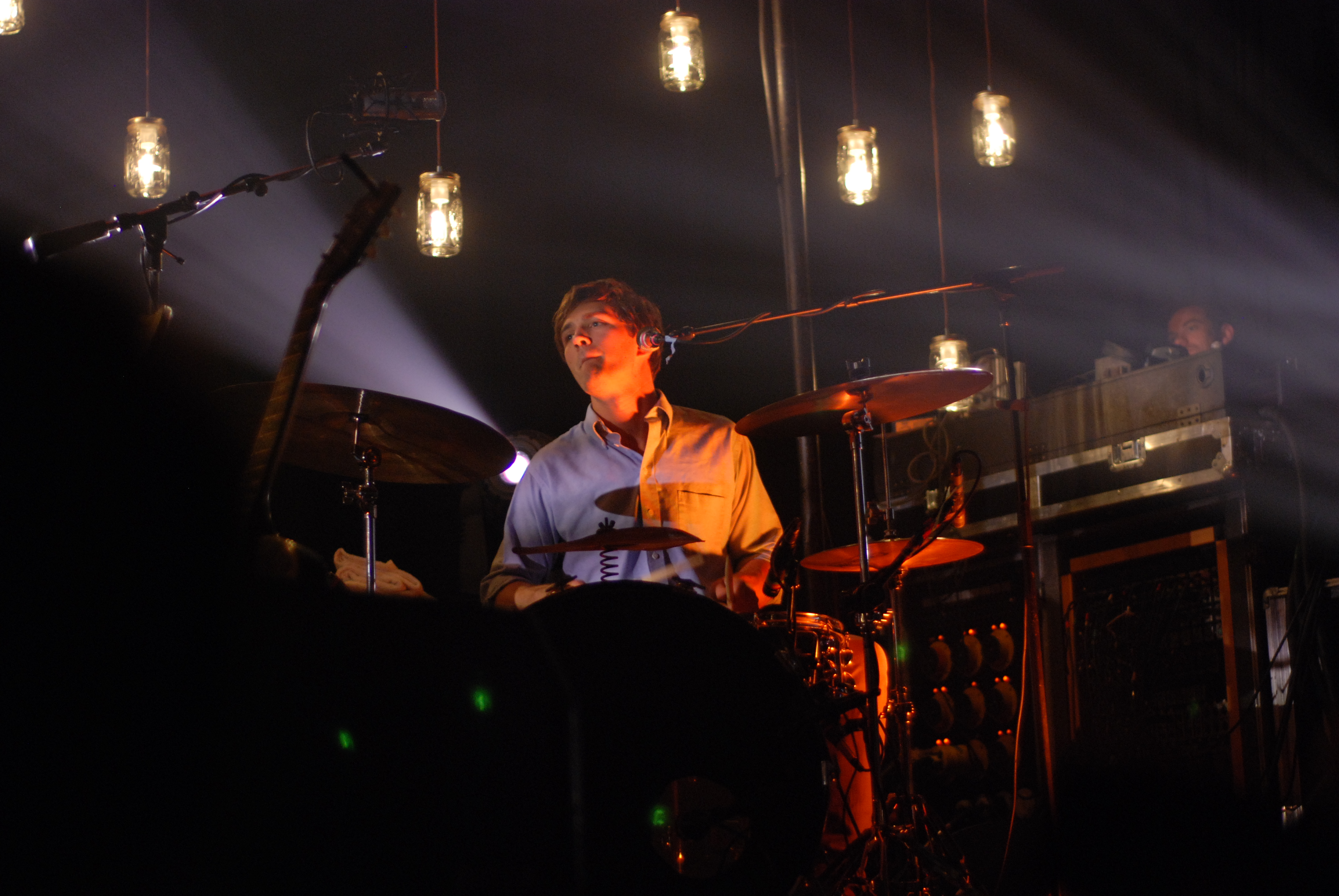
- Bear performing with Grizzly Bear in 2009

Background information
- Born: Christopher Robert Bear; July 19, 1982 (age 43)
- Origin: Chicago, Illinois
- Occupations: Musician; arranger; conductor
- Instruments: Drums; percussion; vocals; keyboards; guitar
- Years active: 2005–present
- Labels: Warp Records; Kanine Records; Music from Memory
- Website: Grizzly Bear web site

Christopher Robert Bear (born July 19, 1982) is an American multi-instrumentalist and composer. He is best known as a member of the Brooklyn-based indie-rock group Grizzly Bear, with whom he has recorded five studio albums. In 2025, Bear joined Dirty Projectors, recording a trio-based studio album with founding member Dave Longstreth and bassist Karl McComas-Reichl.

Bear joined Grizzly Bear with singer Ed Droste for contributions on their first record, Horn of Plenty. He also contributed to Earl Greyhound's self-titled EP in 2004. Bear worked with fellow Grizzly Bear bandmates Daniel Rossen and Chris Taylor on Rossen's project Department of Eagles, contributing drums to their second album, In Ear Park.

In addition to his continuing work with Grizzly Bear, Bear was briefly a member of Dirty Projectors, whom he rejoined in 2025 to record a studio album and tour. Bear continues developing his independent career most recently working on arranging soundtracks for the HBO series High Maintenance. Bear has also performed live and recorded drums with the band Beach House, and contributed drums and percussion on 9 out of 15 tracks on the 2020 album Shore by Fleet Foxes.

Bear also records under his solo project Fools. He released his first solo album Fools' Harp Vol.1 in May 2020. Bear would once again work with Grizzly Bear bandmate Daniel Rossen on his debut solo album, which he confirmed through his Instagram page in April 2021. Bear and Rossen also composed the music for the 2023 film Past Lives.

Bear provided the score to the 2025 film, Roofman, directed by Derek Cianfrance and starring Channing Tatum.
