= Damon McMahon =

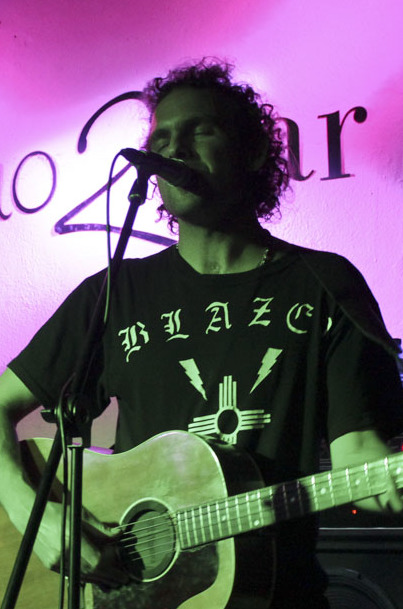
- McMahon in 2014

Background information
- Born: 1980 (age 45–46); Philadelphia, Pennsylvania, U.S.
- Occupations: Singer; songwriter
- Instruments: Vocals; guitar; piano
- Years active: 2003–present
- Labels: Astralwerks; EMI

Damon Duell McMahon is an American indie rock musician and the primary member of the musical project Amen Dunes. Originally from Philadelphia, he is currently based in New York City.

== Early life and education ==
McMahon was born in Philadelphia and grew up in Weston, Connecticut. His mother, Thea Duell, was a prolific painter and sculptor, a lawyer at Morgan, Lewis & Bockius, and the head of a real estate company in New York City. She died on June 27, 2018. She was a Jewish American and a child of survivors of the Holocaust. His father is an Irish Catholic "working-class guy" from Philadelphia. McMahon attended his mother's alma mater, Swarthmore College, where he studied Chinese as an English Literature and Performance double major.

== Career ==
McMahon was previously a member of short-lived NYC group Inouk. Originally formed in Philadelphia, Inouk was made up of McMahon on guitar and vocals, his brother, Alexander McMahon on guitar, keyboard, and vocals, Ian Fenger on lead guitar, Jesse Johnson on bass and vocals, and Glen Brasile on drums. In 2004, Inouk released a 4-song EP recorded by Chris Zane called Search For The Bees on Say Hey Records, followed by a full length record called No Danger later in 2004, also on Say Hey Records.

He also recorded a solo album under his own name called Mansions on Astralwerks.

== Personal life ==
McMahon currently lives in Brooklyn. He has previously lived in Los Angeles, Taiwan, Nanjing and Beijing.

In December 2018, comments made by McMahon during an interview with No Fear of Pop in 2014 were recirculated on social media. In the interview, McMahon replied that he did not wish to collaborate with female musicians, stating, "I don't think my energy would work with that. I mean, I love women, and I have plenty of female friends, but I don't think my energy would work with a woman. I don't know, I can't imagine it, actually. It's just not my vibe, and I don't mean that in any kind of disparaging or critical way; I just don't think chemically it'll work." McMahon responded with a post on Amen Dunes' Facebook page, where he revealed that he had been sexually abused by two different adult women throughout his adolescence, between the ages of 9 and 18. He said, "When I finally reached an age where I gained enough courage to begin to acknowledge what happened to me, Amen Dunes became a form of my own therapy. It was the one safe space I had to explore the feelings and the trauma from childhood, and to start to try and reclaim my identity and sexuality as a man." He also said, "I realize without giving context, my answer was not phrased well. At that time I did not feel it appropriate, nor was I healed enough, to explain my reason in detail." The recirculation of McMahon's prior comments on social media without context has been labeled as an example of cancel culture.

== Discography ==
=== Solo albums ===
- Mansions (2006)

=== With Inouk ===
- Search for the Bees (2004) – EP
- No Danger (2004)

=== With Amen Dunes ===
- D.I.A. (2009)
- Through Donkey Jaw (2011)
- Spoiler (2013)
- Love (2014)
- Freedom (2018)
- Death Jokes (2024)
