= Freedom (Amen Dunes album) =

Studio album by Amen Dunes
- Released: March 30, 2018
- Studios: Electric Lady (Manhattan, NY); Sunset Sound (Hollywood, CA); Trout Recording (Brooklyn, NY); Future Past Studios (Hudson, NY)
- Genres: Indie rock; folk; psychedelic folk
- Length: 47:06
- Label: Sacred Bones
- Producer: Chris Coady

Amen Dunes chronology
Cowboy Worship (2015)	Freedom (2018)

Singles from Freedom
- 1. "Miki Dora" Released: January 17, 2018; 2. "Blue Rose" Released: February 14, 2018; 3. "Believe" Released: March 13, 2018

Freedom is the fifth studio album by American indie rock band Amen Dunes. It was released on March 30, 2018, by Sacred Bones Records.

The album was written by Damon McMahon in Portugal and New York City in 2015. It was recorded primarily at the renowned Electric Lady Studios in Greenwich Village. Produced by Chris Coady, the album marks a clear shift from the lo-fi, dark sound and dense lyrics of previous Amen Dunes records to a more accessible pop rock style with more direct lyricism. It has a more electronic sound with synths backing the songs and electric guitar in place of McMahon's usual acoustic guitar sound.

Written and recorded over the span of three years, Freedom features a number of musicians including Italian electronic artist Panoram (Raffaele Martirani), Yeah Yeah Yeahs guitarist Nick Zinner and Amen Dunes collaborators Parker Kindred and Jordi Wheeler, as well as guitarist Delicate Steve and McMahon's brother Xander Duell. Its lyrical content draws from McMahon's childhood, his relationship with his father, masculinity, and his mother, who was diagnosed with terminal cancer at the beginning of the album's recording. Freedom has been described as a concept album, with each song being an exploration of self through both real and fictional characters.

Upon its release, Freedom received widespread acclaim from music critics, who later ranked it among the best albums of 2018. The album was described by Pitchfork as his "euphoric breakthrough". It was preceded by the singles "Miki Dora", "Blue Rose" and "Believe".

== Background and recording ==
In 2015, after numerous tours in support of Amen Dunes' fourth studio album Love, Damon McMahon spent a few weeks in Lisbon, Portugal, where he began writing Freedom. He came home to New York City shortly after and spent months with Amen Dunes collaborators Jordi Wheeler and Parker Kindred putting drums, guitars and keyboards to the songs and coming up with structural ideas himself.

Recording of the album first began in February 2016 at Future Past Studios in Hudson, New York with Jordi Wheeler and Parker Kindred, joined by Delicate Steve. Dissatisfied with the results, McMahon decided to completely scrap what they had recorded and start over with a different approach. He called producer Chris Coady for help, who brought them into Electric Lady Studios. He brought in more musicians, including bass guitarist Gus Seyffert, multi-instrumentalist Panoram, guitarist Nick Zinner, and his brother Xander Duell.

Freedom was recorded at four separate studios in the United States. The bulk of the songs were recorded at Electric Lady Studios in the Greenwich Village neighborhood of Manhattan, New York and finished at Sunset Sound Recorders in the Hollywood neighborhood of Los Angeles, California. McMahon, Nick Zinner and Gus Seyffert fleshed out the recordings at Sunset Sound. A single vocal take from the sessions at Future Past Studios in Hudson, New York was kept. The album was also recorded at Trout Recording in Brooklyn, New York, with McMahon primarily overdubbing by himself.

Damon McMahon's mother, Thea Duell, was diagnosed with terminal cancer when he started writing Freedom. She died in June 2018. The opening track, "Intro", features a quote read by Thea. McMahon had her record herself using her phone, which he then altered to add a robotic effect.

== Composition ==
=== Musical style and influences ===
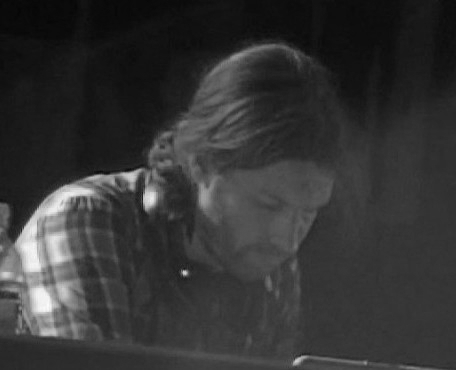
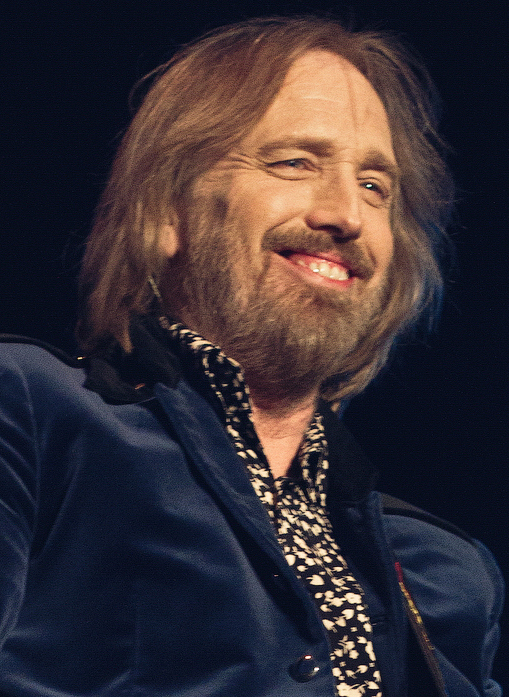
Aphex Twin (left) and Tom Petty (right) have been cited as having influenced the album's style.

Freedom marks a clear shift from the lo-fi, dark sound and dense lyrics of previous Amen Dunes records to a more dynamic and pop rock style with more direct lyricism. It has a more electronic sound with synths backing the songs and electric guitar in place of McMahon's usual acoustic guitar sound.

McMahon described Freedom himself as being centered around three kinds of music, "rock music, pop music, and electronic music." He has said he was influenced by Michael Jackson; Tom Petty, early Oasis, late Nirvana, unplugged Nirvana but also Aphex Twin and Massive Attack. Specifically, McMahon has said it was mainstream music that he was interested in, "really, really good mainstream music."

=== Lyrics and themes ===
"This whole record is about letting go of my hang-ups through ego-death, man; it’s about relinquishing all the terrestrial identities and histories and personal events and family lineage – all the things that I’d kind of clung to my whole life."

— Damon McMahon

Described as a "relinquishing of self through an exploration of self," each song on Freedom explores a different aspect of self through both real and fictional characters. The characters include father and mother, Amen Dunes, teenage glue addicts and drug dealer from Paris, ghosts above the plains, fallen surf heroes, vampires, thugs from Naples and thugs from Houston, the emperor of Rome, Jews, Jesus, Tashtego, Perseus, and even Damon McMahon himself. Each character portrait is a representation of McMahon, of masculinity, and of his past. As such, McMahon himself has called Freedom a concept album, stating "It's like this image of this kid, it's this little boy who's like "now that I've shed my origins I'm going to start off in the world and get dreaming." Then he opens up, he's free of his father if you will, and he carries off into this dreamland of all these different characters."

McMahon has described the album as his reckoning with a primary struggle in himself and that doing so revealed "secondary struggles with self" and eventually he realized he had "11 songs of struggle with self, of different colors and shapes and stuff." A core struggle present in Freedom is McMahon's relationship with his father, Paul, who he has said "never supported anything" he did." Other struggles explored in the album include masculinity; spirituality; his chaotic childhood; the realities of adulthood; and mortality, as examined through his mother's approach to her terminal cancer and overall how she had lived her life, which McMahon had previously been critical of.

All of the struggles and characters are explored and embodied in an attempt at letting them all go. The final track on the album, L.A., represents this breakthrough.

==== The vacant mind ====
The concept of the "vacant mind" is introduced within the first minute of the album and is the central inspiration for the lyrics and themes that form Freedom. McMahon's songwriting style consists of recording himself sitting with guitar and singing unstructured words. He plays the recording back over and over until he can derive lyrics from it. He has said, "the vacant mind dictates the general lyric and then my conscious mind refines it." The final lyric on the album connects back to the vacant mind.

=== Songs ===
The album opens with "Intro", a 50-second track beginning with a sample from a YouTube video of a child reciting Kurt Russell's pre-game speech in the 2004 film Miracle, where he played U.S. Olympic hockey coach Herb Brooks. The phrase "this is your time" is repeated twice. The sample is backed by a "Spacemen 3-esque seasick" electronic drone. The end of the song features the quote "I don't have any ideas myself; I have a vacant mind" by abstract painter Agnes Martin, as spoken by McMahon's mother.

"Blue Rose" is a "woozy disco-dub-folk jam" that features "echoing" guitars, "propulsive" percussion and "glowing" synths. The narrator of the song is the Amen Dunes character. The beginning of the song includes the lyric "When the evening comes I go call up the band, we play religious music I don't think you'd understand," an allusion to musical energy of Amen Dunes that empowers McMahon. The song is also an exploration of the relationship he had with his unpredictable father. McMahon's father was very disapproving of his career as a musician, which McMahon describes as "a very early imprint of conflict" that he needed to explore. "Blue Rose" is a song of retribution as a means of catharsis for McMahon's "adult self" and "little kid self," with the lyric "kill off my father" furthering this idea. The song ends with the lyric "You weren't much a man to me, but you're the only one I've ever had".

"Time" is a "warm" song featuring "feathery" drumming, "hallow" synths and "country like-guitars". The narrator explores an "identity hang-up" as he lists instances of the persecution of Jews. McMahon's mother was Jewish. The song mentions the crucifixion of Jesus, the expulsion of Jews from Spain in the 15th century, moving to Ancient Rome, and The Holocaust. Pain is a central theme of the song, with it being described as a necessary evil as the narrator wails, "So much pain, induction pain, yeah". McMahon has said that acknowledging pain is healthy and the way to liberate yourself from your hang ups. The song is also about mortality, with imagery of an afterlife of sitting atop a "silver cloud, so empty now".

"Skipping School" is a slow-burner featuring a "low, echoing" harmonica. The song builds tension through a "gentle, melancholic minor chord" that swells into a climactic release at the song's finish. Divided into two parts, the first half of the song finds the narrator waking up in a drugged out daze and thinking that he would "maybe stay high forever and drift along the Mekong if I could". The song locates McMahon's father as a child, "the coolest kid in school" whilst "in the alley, sniffing glue". He then recalls the cool kids that he grew up with and was bullied by, but whose lives ultimately did not pan out well. The song conflates the masculinity of McMahon's father with the troublemakers McMahon grew up with and looked up to, many of whom eventually went to prison or died. In the second half of the song the narrator is older, "on the road somewhere" and "doing fine". He feels superior and criticizes his former friends, saying he would go back and show them if he could. He then finds himself in trouble on his way to "North Pigalle" in Paris. He realizes he is guilty of acting the same way he had been critical of them for. The song ends with the narrator letting go of himself and trying to find forgiveness.

"Calling Paul the Suffering" is a "bright" song with a "danceable" groove in a "skittering" beat, backed by "gleaming" synthesizer hums and "glossy" guitars. The song's lyrics and vocal style have been compared to glossolalia. The song is about McMahon's father, Paul, but also about the regret people feel going through their lives wishing they could do it over. McMahon has said that the song has "a lot less of the conscious mind" in it and that it wrote itself. The lyric "I've been rolling for two years now, I'll make you proud boo" is reference to McMahon's mother, who his father called boo.

"Miki Dora"
The album's lead single, "Miki Dora", is described as having its strongest melody.

"Miki Dora" is a "spacey" folk song with "slinky" guitars and a "coasting" beat that "ebbs and flows like the ocean waves". McMahon has attributed the song's "surfy" feel to its lack of a chorus. Similar to "Skipping School", "Miki Dora" builds tension and swells to a climatic release. It has been described as having the strongest melody on Freedom, as well as being one of Damon McMahon's greatest songs. The song's title is a reference to Miki Dora, a noted surfer of the 1950s and 1960s in Malibu, California. The song is largely about male identity. Miki Dora is often portrayed as a heroic and charismatic figure despite having been known also to be a surly and standoffish person with bigoted views and a criminal record. Damon McMahon has said, "He felt a little bit like me and a little bit like the bullshit that I've always been told to gravitate towards, like unavailable, shut down men who are macho, morally questionable and really aggressive. Those are the people that I think were modelled in my home or my community, or in the media". He embodies Dora in the song, empathizing with him but also being critical of him. He illustrates how attractive and destructive some notions of masculinity can be, using Miki Dora as a symbol from an old era with the repeated lyric "the waves are gone". Similar to "Calling Paul the Suffering", the song is also about regret. The narrator is an old man singing about his past: "pride destroyed me, man".

"Satudarah" has "dirge-like" atmospherics. The song's title is a reference to Satudarah MC, an outlaw motorcycle club from the Netherlands with a reputation from violent criminal activity. Satudarah MC is used in the song as a metaphor for the kids McMahon grew up with but also his family, specifically his father. McMahon broke away from his "gang" by defying his father's wishes and pursuing a career as a musician. The narrator of the song says "I stood up, pushed my chair back" as a sign of breaking away from the group. Satudarah MC is also used as an example of machismo masculinity, which McMahon grew up around. The song features the only vocal take kept from the recording sessions at Future Past Studios in Hudson, New York.

Described as the "emotional centerpiece" of the album, "Believe" is a "sultry" and "mid-tempo, folk-ish ballad". The narrator in the song is closer to the relinquishing of self than the other characters on the album. The song is primarily about Damon McMahon's mother, who was diagnosed with terminal cancer at the beginning of the album's recording. The lyric "They said you lived out on the wrong side, you said that's half the fun" describes his mother's lifestyle. McMahon has said that he was always very critical of her lifestyle and that in "Believe" is the realization that she was actually "free and unencumbered" and that maybe it was a better way of living than his own. The song is also about letting her go and about McMahon becoming at peace with his own mortality through hers.

"Dracula" has a "roots rock shuffle" and is set in Houston, Texas. The narrator is an "aloof" character who is focused too much on his predatory past that he eventually repeats it. He later has a spiritual awakening while driving on the highway: "What can you do when every thought you had was untrue? Been dreaming too long". The Amen Dunes character comes through the car radio, singing the lyric "Powerful two-chord blues, coming through from me to you". The two characters merge and drive down the highway together, concluding the lyrics with "Maybe this is all, let's keep it short and sweet/Keeping my brights on, we got miles to go". At one point in the song, the narrator becomes the girl that he manipulates, saying "arm in arm with Houston thug" then "Cutie's mind is on fire, she had a spiritual good time". McMahon is re-embodying these characters and liberating them. Comparing the song to "Skipping School", he said the predatory narrator is about both people he grew up with and met along the way but also himself, saying "I've been on both sides of the coin".

"Freedom" is an anthem inspired by the music of Hüsker Dü and Bruce Springsteen that "unravels into a sun-baked slow dance". At the song's seeming conclusion, there is a brief moment of silence followed by a 55-second instrumental outro. McMahon has called the song the most abstract on the album, but added that it's partly about forgiveness, or letting go and being freed from the past.

"L.A." is a sprawling, six-minute closer, "moving from guitar ambiance to fractured electronics". The song's character is a masculine identity: a man in Hollywood Hills dreaming about being the Emperor of the Roman Empire with his arm around a stranger. Later, as he is driving into town, the man has a fevered fantasy about having sex with his ex-girlfriend. The song then devolves into a nonsensical dream-state lyrics, leaving the man hung up on his past. McMahon compared the character to the character on "Miki Dora". McMahon called the drums and synthesizers on "L.A." a "direct rip off" of those on the Aphex Twin song "Acrid Avid Jam Shred". He also said the song's swells were inspired by Massive Attack's "Unfinished Sympathy". The song features the YouTube sample included on Freedom's opening track "Intro". The final lyrics of "L.A.", "That's all not me", were inspired by the song "That's Not Me" by British grime artist Skepta. The final lyrics tie into the Agnes Martin quote featured on "Intro", relating to the concept of the vacant mind. McMahon said, "It conveniently ties into the theme of the album, which is "that's all not me," meaning all these things from the Irish dad, to the Jewishness, to the surf hero, to my childhood, to teen years, to my 20s; all this shit, as hung up as I am in it, it's actually not all me, it's an attempt at letting it go".

== Artwork and title ==
The album's artwork features a headshot of Damon McMahon, framed by a white border. The photograph and art direction are by Tuomas Korpijaakko, who worked on the photography and art direction of previous Amen Dunes albums. The artist name and album title are located in the upper right-hand corner along with the Sacred Bones Records logo and catalog number, typical for Sacred Bones releases. The upper left-hand corner includes a label stating "in Stereo" to indicate the album is in stereophonic sound. In contrast to Freedom, previous Amen Dunes records did not feature McMahon on the artwork. This change has been considered a representation of the album's musical clarity as well as the close up nature of the photograph being seen as representative of the more personal and direct nature of the lyrics and themes.

The title Freedom corresponds to the "relinquishing of self through an exploration of self" theme of the album. It was, however, decided upon before the album was made. McMahon said "the same way that Love was kind of cheeky, this was a little bit of a smug, kind of punk thing to name an album." The tenth and penultimate track on the album also shares the album's name.

== Release and promotion ==
Freedom was announced on January 17, 2018, alongside the release of the album's lead single "Miki Dora" and an accompanying music video directed by Steven Brahms.

"Blue Rose" was released on February 14, 2018, as the album's second single with an accompanying music video directed by Alex Goldberg.

"Believe" was released on March 13, 2018, as the album's third and final single. A music video for "Believe" was later released on June 18, 2018, also directed by Steven Brahms.

The album was streamed a week in advance starting on March 22, 2018, through NPR's "First Listen" series.

A deluxe version of Freedom was released digitally on November 30, 2018. It includes live versions of "Freedom", "Skipping School", "Miki Dora" and "L.A." recorded at various shows throughout Amen Dunes' European tour.

== Critical reception ==
Professional ratings
Aggregate scores
Source	Rating
AnyDecentMusic?	7.9/10
Metacritic	87/100
Review scores
Source	Rating
AllMusic	4.5/5 stars
Clash	8/10
Exclaim!	9/10
Mojo	4/5 stars
NME	5/5 stars
The Observer	3/5 stars
Paste	8.2/10
Pitchfork	8.6/10
Q	4/5 stars
Uncut	8/10

Freedom has received acclaim from critics. At Metacritic, which assigns a normalised rating out of 100 to reviews from mainstream publications, the album received an average score of 87, based on 17 reviews. Ben Homewood of NME gave the album a perfect score calling it a "grand, pop-rock masterpiece" and said, "It's the scale of Freedom's sound that cements it as an instantaneous classic; far and away McMahon's most complete work to date. His reedy, beaten-down vocal is so magnificent you wonder where he's been hiding it all these years, while every track thrums with its own deep groove." Sam Sodomsky of Pitchfork praised the album calling it "the most dynamic, confident Amen Dunes record to date" and said, "On Freedom, McMahon's voice is clearer, his hooks are sharper, and his music—once a hazy spider web of hisses, drones, and vamps—opens to reveal a latent aspiration toward the classic-rock songbook."

In a mixed review, Rowan Savage of Tiny Mix Tapes felt that the album suffered from not being as "dark, as gnarly, or as weird" as previous Amen Dunes albums, stating, "The vocals are often low in the mix, which is a shame, but it creates a mumblecore naturalism that is also freedom of a sort. Synthesizers join or replace the folky guitars of his previous albums, and tracks meld together in memory over the course of the work."

=== Year-end lists ===
Publication	Rank	List
BrooklynVegan	31	Top 50 Albums of 2018
Digital Trends	3	The Best Albums of 2018
Esquire UK	N/A	The 50 Best Albums of 2018
Far Out Magazine	3	The 50 best albums of 2018
Flavorwire	11	The 25 Best Albums of 2018
Flood Magazine	11	The Best Albums of 2018
Gorilla vs. Bear	4	Albums of 2018
The Line of Best Fit	29	The Best Albums of 2018
musicOMH	35	Top 50 Albums of 2018
NME	31	Albums of the Year 2018
Noisey	63	The 100 Best Albums of 2018
OOR	13	OOR's Eindlijst 2018
Paste	11	The 50 Best Albums of 2018
Pitchfork	14	The 50 Best Albums of 2018
The Skinny	32	Top 50 Albums of 2018
Spin	4	The 51 Best Albums of 2018
Tiny Mix Tapes	48	2018: Favorite 50 Music Releases
Under the Radar	55	Top 100 Albums of 2018
Uproxx	29	The 50 Best Albums of 2018

== Track listing ==
All tracks are written by Damon McMahon.

No.	Title	Length
1.	"Intro"	0:50
2.	"Blue Rose"	4:06
3.	"Time"	4:50
4.	"Skipping School"	5:28
5.	"Calling Paul the Suffering"	3:01
6.	"Miki Dora"	5:03
7.	"Satudarah"	2:43
8.	"Believe"	5:46
9.	"Dracula"	4:16
10.	"Freedom"	5:00
11.	"L.A."	6:03

Freedom – Deluxe edition
No.	Title	Length
12.	"Freedom (Live in Vienna)"	6:55
13.	"Skipping School (Live in Vienna)"	5:57
14.	"Miki Dora (Live in Prague)"	6:16
15.	"L.A. (Live in Brighton)"	6:46

== Personnel ==
Credits adapted from liner notes.

Musicians

- Damon McMahon – vocals (2, 3, 4, 5, 6, 7, 8, 9, 10, 11), rhythm guitar (6, 7, 8, 10), outro rhythm guitar (4), nighttime guitar (3), guitar lines (9), solos (8), synth guitar (7), piano (4), artificial piano (5), keyboards (2, 5, 9, 10), outro nighttime airplane keyboard (11), Hollywood fire moan (9)
- Parker Kindred – drums (2, 3, 4, 5, 6, 7, 8, 9, 10, 11), percussion (2, 3, 4, 5, 6, 8, 9, 10), I care because you do percussion (11), walking guitar line (6), guitar line (9)
- Steve Marion – strawberry funk guitar (2), highway guitar (3), chime & bell guitars (4), dancing past gas lamps on a dark night guitars (5), business solos & chime guitars (6), spiral guitar (7), swamp & sunrise guitars (8), interstate dream guitars (9), rolling guitars (11), windmill electric guitar (10), windmill acoustic guitar (10), swells (3, 4)
- Raffaele Martirani – keyboards (1, 2, 3, 4, 10, 11), keyboard arpeggio (8), sampler (1, 10, 11), piano (8), vortex piano (10), Korg dirty bass (11), manipulation (2), arpeggio (3), Naples hooligans (4), seagulls samples (10)
- Jordi Wheeler – underwater guitar (2), keyboard bass (3), piano (3), outro waterfall guitar (4), underwater keyboards (6), movement guitars (8), keyboards (11)
- Gus Seyffert – bass guitar (2, 4, 5, 8, 10), intro bass guitar (11)
- Xander Duell – harmonica (4), dark keyboard (7), twilight keyboard (9)
- Benji Lysaght – rhythm guitar (3), intro rhythm guitar (11)
- Nick Zinner – L.A. guitar (2), pulse guitar (10)
- Autry Fulbright – bass guitar (9)
- Thea – A.I. voice (1)
- Chris Coady – infinity loop (8)

Technical personnel

- Chris Coady – production (at Electric Lady Studios in NYC and Sunset Sound in Los Angeles), recording (at Electric Lady Studios in NYC and Sunset Sound in Los Angeles)
- Craig Silvey – mixing
- Max Prior – additional mixing
- Greg Calbi – mastering
- Steve Fallone – mastering
- Bryce Goggin – additional recording (at Trout Recording)
- Adam Sachs – additional recording (at Trout Recording)
- Daniel Schlett – additional recording (at Future Past)
- Sarah Tudzin – additional recording (at Sunset Sound)
- Tuomas Korpijaakko – art direction, photography

== Charts ==
Chart (2018)	Peak position
Belgian Albums (Ultratop Flanders)	155
US Heatseekers Albums (Billboard)	7
US Independent Albums (Billboard)	17
