= Fort Nightly =

Studio album by White Rabbits
- Released: May 22, 2007
- Genre: Indie rock
- Length: 41:02
- Label: Say Hey

White Rabbits chronology
Fort Nightly (2007)	It's Frightening (2009)

Professional ratings
Review scores
Source	Rating
AllMusic	4.0/5 stars
Pitchfork	8.1/10

Fort Nightly is the debut studio album by American indie rock band White Rabbits. It was released May 22, 2007 on Say Hey Records.

== Track listing ==
1. "Kid on My Shoulders" – 4:36
2. "The Plot" – 3:33
3. "Dinner Party" – 3:48
4. "Navy Wives" – 4:24
5. "While We Go Dancing" – 4:19
6. "I Used to Complain Now I Don't" – 3:39
7. "Take a Walk Around the Table" – 3:46
8. "March of the Camels" – 4:31
9. "Fort Nightly" – 3:58
10. "Reprise" – 0:48
11. "Tourist Trap" – 4:11
