= Tripticks Tapes =

American independent record label

- Founded: 2020
- Founder: Nat Baldwin
- Genre: experimental music; improvisation; noise music; free jazz
- Location: Massachusetts
- Official website: triptickstapes.bandcamp.com

Tripticks Tapes is an American independent record label specializing in cassette tape and digital releases of experimental and improvised music.

== History ==
Nat Baldwin founded Tripticks Tapes in 2020. Tripticks releases have been named among the best in music by publications including The Wire, Bandcamp Daily, Burning Ambulance, The Road to Sound, and Tabs Out, with notable artists including Weston Olencki, Nick Dunston, Amirtha Kidambi and Luke Stewart, Webb Crawford, Patrick Shiroishi, Travis Laplante and Jason Nazary, Beam Splitter, and Phicus.

== Discography ==
Cat.#	Artist	Title	Year
TTT001	Nat Baldwin	Autonomia III: Endnotes	2020
TTT002	Patrick Shiroishi	Resting In The Heart Of Green Shade	2021
TTT003	Phicus (Fages, Reviriego, Trilla)	Liquid	2021
TTT004	Fraser / McCowen / Weinberg	Thip	2021
TTT005	Graham / Hobbs / Nakatani / Shen	Scar's The Limit	2021
TTT006	The Pitch	KM28	2021
TTT007	Àlex Reviriego	Raben	2021
TTT008	fluke-mogul / Liberatore / Mattrey / Mendoza	Death In the Gilded Age	2021
TTT009	Laplante / Nazary	Tunnel of Light	2021
TTT010	Luke Stewart	Works For Electric Bass Guitar	2021
TTT011	TAK / Brandon Lopez	Empty And/Or Church Of Plenty	2021
TTT012	Steve Long	Code-Talker	2021
TTT013	Cecilia Lopez & Joe Moffett	Caprichos	2021
TTT014	The Relatives	The Relatives	2022
TTT015	Ted Reichman	Dread Sea	2022
TTT016	L'Ocell & Ferran Fages	El Declivi	2022
TTT017	Weston Olencki	Old Time Music	2022
TTT018	Nat Baldwin	Red Barn	2022
TTT019	Wallace / Lopez / Foster / Ali	The Inflatable Leviathan	2022
TTT020	Amirtha Kidambi & Luke Stewart	Zenith/Nadir	2022
TTT021	Matteo Liberatore	Lacquer	2022
TTT022	Irarrázabal & Baldwin	Grips	2022
TTT023	Webb Crawford	Joiners	2022
TTT024	García / Navas / Reviriego / Trilla	Les Capelles	2022
TTT025	Kyle Motl & Carlos Dominguez	Field of Fried Umbrellas	2022
TTT026	Tomomi Kubo & Camila Nebbia	Polycephaly	2022
TTT027	Fraser / Ángeles / Nazary	Aqrabuamelu	2022
TTT028	Leo Chang & Lucie Vítková	Religion	2022
TTT029	Beeferman / Evans / Foster / Hirsch	Glow	2023
TTT030	Polyorchard	scree/n	2023
TTT031	Ilia Belorukov & Gabriel Ferrandini	Sculptor	2023
TTT032	Evan Lindorff-Ellery	Swollen Air	2023
TTT033	Playbackers	Playbackers Record	2023
TTT034	Beam Splitter	Split Jaw	2023
TTT035	Müller / Doskocz / Gordoa	Aural Accidents	2023
TTT036	Dominic Coles	Alphabets	2023
TTT037	Carlo Costa & John McCowen	Pianissimo Etc	2023
TTT038	Nick Dunston	Skultura	2023
TTT039	Daniel Fishkin	Dark Listening	2023
TTT040	Hollow Deck	Over East	2023
TTT041	Phicus	Ni	2023
