= Miki Dora =

American surfer (1934–2002)

- Dora in 1963

Personal information
- Born: Miklos Sandor Dora III; August 11, 1934 Budapest, Hungary
- Died: January 3, 2002 (aged 67) Montecito, California, US
- Height: 6 ft 0 in (183 cm)

Surfing career
- Sport: Surfing

Surfing specifications
- Stance: Regular (natural foot)

Miklos Sandor "Miki" Dora III (August 11, 1934 – January 3, 2002) was a noted surfer of the 1950s and 1960s in Malibu, California. Dora received numerous nicknames and aliases during his life, including "The Black Knight," "the Gypsy darling," "Malibu Mickey," "Kung'Bu," "the Fiasco Kid," "El Taquache," and "Da Cat."

== Life ==
Dora was born in Budapest, Hungary and moved to California as a child. His parents divorced when he was 6 years old. Dora stayed with his mother, Ramona Stancliff Dora Chapin, but was mostly raised by his grandmother, with whom he lived well into his 20s.

Dora was introduced to surfing by his father, Miklos, in the late 1930s. His stepfather Gard Chapin was also a "surf pioneer . . . a roughneck rebel who never fit into polite society." Chapin's obsessions with surfboard design brought Dora into contact with California industrial designers including visits to the studio of Charles and Ray Eames. Dora called himself Mickey Chapin sometimes, a name that gave him a rare status in surfing - it made him second generation. In 1958, Dora acted as stunt double for actor James Darren in the surf themed movie Gidget.

Dora's signature surfboard, released in 1966, became the biggest selling surfboard in history, and again on its re-release 25 years later. The visibility of surfers such as Dora as well as the impact of Gidget meant many new surfers were starting to surf and thus crowding out existing surfers such as Dora. This sudden influx of surfers caused Dora to decry the masses both in person and in advertisements for his surfboards, one of which features Dora being crucified on two of his boards.

Dora decided to leave the U.S. in 1974 and lived around the world spending a majority of his time in France and, in the '80s, South Africa. After he returned to the US from France in 1981, he was subsequently arrested by the FBI for violating his parole by leaving the country in 1975 after pleading guilty to writing a bad check for the purchase of ski equipment. While serving time for that, he was sentenced to six months in federal prison after a Denver grand jury indicted him for credit card fraud in 1982.

Despite his perceived mistrust towards the commercialization of surfing, Dora did enter into a profit sharing arrangement with Greg Noll to release a limited number of Miki Dora "da cat" surfboards, during which time he created magazine advertisements promoting the boards. Dora was known to paint a swastika on his surfboards and author David Rensin who wrote Dora's biography, surfboard designer Dale Velzy and surf champion Nat Young all describe his views as racist.

Dora died at his father's home in Montecito, California, on January 3, 2002, at age 67 from pancreatic cancer.

"... If you took James Dean's cool, Muhammad Ali's poetics, Harry Houdini's slipperiness, James Bond's jet-setting, George Carlin's irony and Kwai Chang Caine's Zen, and rolled them into one man with a longboard under his arm, you'd come up with something like Miki Dora, surfing's mythical antihero, otherwise known as the Black Knight of Malibu."

— surfer and author Jamie Brisick, in a retrospective on Dora.

== Filmography ==
Feature Films

Year	Title	Role	Notes
1963	Beach Party	Beach Boy	
1964	Surf Party	Surfer	
1964	Muscle Beach Party	Surfer Boy	
1964	For Those Who Think Young	College Boy	
1964	Bikini Beach	Surfer #6	
1965	Beach Blanket Bingo	Beach Boy	
1965	Ski Party	Mickey	
1965	How to Stuff a Wild Bikini	Beach Boy	
1965	The Living Curl	Himself	
1965	The Endless Summer	Himself	uncredited
1968	The Sweet Ride	Surfer	uncredited

== Popular media ==
- In 2014, Anderson .Paak included the track "Miki Doralude" on his album Venice. The track is an audio clip of Miki Dora talking taken from the 1990 documentary film Surfers: The Movie.
- In 2018, Amen Dunes named a song "Miki Dora" on their album Freedom.
- In 2023 Pushkin Industries published season 3 of their podcast Lost Hills, titled "the Dark Prince" which follows the story of Miki Dora.
