= Nat Baldwin =

American bassist and singer (born 1980)

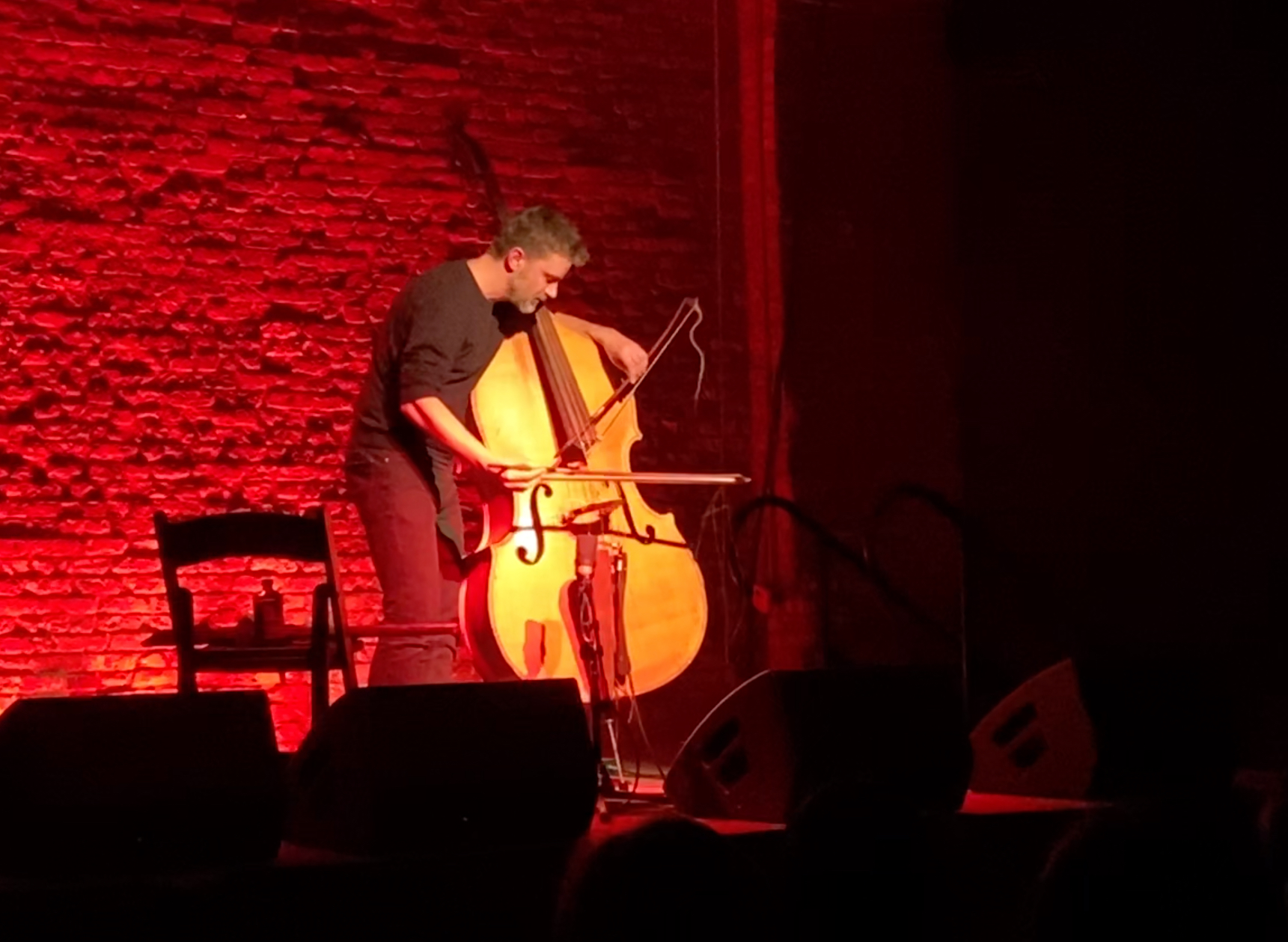
- Nat Baldwin at Pioneer Works in Brooklyn, 2020

Background information
- Born: February 21, 1980 (age 46); Rochester, New Hampshire
- Genres: Experimental
- Occupation: Musician
- Instruments: Double Bass, Electric Bass
- Years active: 2000–present
- Label: Tripticks Tapes Western Vinyl Shinkoyo / Artist Pool Traced Objects
- Website: https://natbaldwin.bandcamp.com/ https://triptickstapes.bandcamp.com/

Nat Baldwin (born February 21, 1980, in Rochester, New Hampshire) is an American bassist, improvisor, and songwriter known for his solo work and as a former member of Dirty Projectors.

== Career ==
In 2020, Baldwin released a series of experimental works for solo double bass: AUTONOMIA I: Body Without Organs, AUTONOMIA II: Recombinations, and AUTONOMIA III: Endnotes.

He has appeared on many albums such as In Ear Park (2008) by Department of Eagles, Contra (2010) by Vampire Weekend and Shields (2012) by Grizzly Bear.

== Tripticks Tapes ==
In 2020, Baldwin founded Tripticks Tapes, a tape label that has been recognized for showcasing a broad range of improvised and experimental music.

Tripticks releases have been named among the best in music by publications including The Wire, Bandcamp Daily, Burning Ambulance, and The Road to Sound, with notable artists including Weston Olencki, Nick Dunston, Amirtha Kidambi and Luke Stewart, Webb Crawford, Patrick Shiroishi, Travis Laplante and Jason Nazary, Phicus, and Beam Splitter.

== Solo discography ==
- Solo Contrabass (2003)
- Lights Out (2005)
- Enter the Winter (2006)
- Most Valuable Player (2007)
- People Changes (2011)
- In the Hollows (2014)
- AUTONOMIA I: Body Without Organs (2020)
- AUTONOMIA II: Recombinations (2020)
- AUTONOMIA III: Endnotes (2020)
- Common Currents (2021)
