= The Library Is on Fire =

US musical group

The Library is on Fire
- Origin: Brooklyn, New York, United States
- Genres: Rock and roll, Alternative rock, Indie rock, Punk rock
- Years active: 2007–present
- Label: Fill in the Blank Records
- Members: Steve Five; Travis Tonn; Peter Sustarsic
- Past members: Antoine Henderson; Cory Race; Mark Shue
- Website: www.thelibraryisonfire.com

The Library is on Fire is an American indie rock band formed by singer/guitarist Steve Five in 2007. Their sound has been described as art punk. The band originally began from a manifesto of the same name written by Five. Five took the name from a poem by French war poet René Char while working at Strand Bookstore, after weekly meetings over coffee with Television guitarist Tom Verlaine. The band headlined their first New York show at Glasslands Gallery in 2008, with future Grammy nominees The Ting Tings opening.

In March 2010, The Library is On Fire released Magic Windows, Magic Nights on Fill in the Blank Records. The album was produced by Todd Tobias, who has worked extensively with Guided by Voices and Robert Pollard. The album features a cameo appearance from Derek Stanton of Awesome Color on lead guitar. In 2010, The Library is On Fire was featured in a video series, Masters From Their Day, produced by Benchmark Media. The band also recorded a cover of Peter Gabriel’s “Digging in the Dirt” for Jagjaguwar/Brah Records’ digital singles series.

== Discography ==
- Cassette (2008), self-released
- Blue Rider & The Looking Glass Fern (2009), Fill in The Blank Records
- Missed Connections (2010), Fill in The Blank Records
- Magic Windows, Magic Nights (2010), Fill in The Blank Records
- Exposé (2011), self-released
- Works On Paper (2011), self-released
- Halcyon & Surrounding Areas (2014), self-released
