= Summer of =

The phrase Summer of __ may refer to:

== Film and television ==
- Summer of '42, a 1971 American coming-of-age film based on Herman Raucher's memoirs
- Summer of 69, a 2025 American sex comedy film
- "The Summer of George", a 1997 episode of the sitcom Seinfeld
- My Summer of Love, a 2004 British film directed by Pawel Pawlikowski
- Summer of Fear (disambiguation), the theatrical release title of the 1978 television movie Stranger in Our House
- Summer of Aviya, an Israeli biopic based on actress Gila Almagor's autobiography
- Summer of the Monkeys, a 1998 film based on the children's novel of the same name
- Summer of Sam, a 1999 Spike Lee film about the Son of Sam serial killings

== Books ==
- Summer of Night, a 1991 horror novel by American writer Dan Simmons
- Summer of Secrets, a 2007 novel by Rosie Rushton
- Summer of the Monkeys, a 1976 children's novel by Wilson Rawls
- Summer of the Swans, a 1970 novel by Betsy Byars

== Music ==
- "Summer of '69", a 1984 song by Bryan Adams
- Summer of '78, a 1996 album by singer-songwriter Barry Manilow
- Summer of Darkness, a 2004 album by American metalcore band Demon Hunter

== Events ==
- Summer of Love, a 1967 social phenomenon connected with American hippie counterculture
- Summer of the Shark, a sensationalist term used by American media to describe a 2001 shark attack
- Google Summer of Code, an annual coding project sponsored by Google
- Summer of Sonic, an annual convention for fans of Sonic the Hedgehog
