= No Danger =

Studio album by Inouk
- Released: August 24, 2004
- Label: Say Hey Records

No Danger is the only full-length studio album released by indie rock band Inouk in 2004.

The band consisted of brothers Damon McMahon (vocals/guitar) of Amen Dunes and Alexander McMahon (vocals/guitars), as well as Ian Fenger (lead guitar), Jesse Johnson (bass) and Glen Brasile (drums).

== Critical reception ==
Professional ratings
Review scores
Source	Rating
AllMusic	4/5 stars
NME	7/10
Uncut	4/5 stars

Devon Powers of PopMatters said that the music was not easy listening: "the threads among and even within tracks weave an intricate tapestry of genres, influences, and subject matter. The risks they take give their songs a heroic tenor in a literal and figurative sense. Figurative because melodies are cast as brave charges over difficult terrain, and literal because thankfully, they defy categorization and, thankfully, it not only works but it also matters." NME's Simon Hayes Budgen described the band as "sounding like an offspring of the Go-Betweens and Talking Heads" and that "professionalism doesn't always have to mean workmanlike". Peter Gaston of Spin described the record as "a bit like Led Zeppelin taken to finishing school". Johnny Loftus of AllMusic said, "Like TV on the Radio, Inouk laps whatever genre it's slotted in, offering more ideas per song than most rock hopefuls have in their white leather belts... The album can meander, so it might not grab those in need of an immediate hooky fix. But as an album of dusty and dark, delicate and dramatic themes, No Danger is a force." Uncut said that the album initially sounded like "a hilariously overcooked stew of wildly incompatible ingredients. But No Danger is rather a cogent and brilliantly wrought rewriting of the alt.rock rulebook." and concluded by calling the record "fabulously foolhardy stuff".

== Track listing ==
1. "What I Want" – 3:55
2. "No Danger" – 4:10
3. "Elected" – 3:36
4. "Father's House" – 3:23
5. "Search for the Bees" – 4:47
6. "With the Birds" – 4:15
7. "Somewhere in France" – 3:21
8. "Island" – 3:56
9. "Cherry Orchard" – 2:50
10. "Nudie Suit" – 5:13
11. "Victory" – 2:02

== Personnel ==
- Glen Brasile – drums
- Ian Fenger – guitar, bass
- Jesse Johnson – bass, guitar, vocals
- Alexander McMahon – vocals, guitar, keyboards
- Damon McMahon – vocals, guitar
