= The Cold Nose =

Studio album by Department of Eagles
- Released: October 21, 2003 (The Whitey On The Moon UK LP); January 8, 2008 (The Cold Nose); October 7, 2008 (U.S. reissue)
- Genre: Indie rock, experimental, electronic
- Length: 36:38 (standard); 16:36 (bonus tracks)
- Label: Isota Records (U.S. original release); Melodic Records (U.K. reissue); American Dust (U.S. reissue with bonus tracks)

Department of Eagles chronology
The Cold Nose (2003)	In Ear Park (2008)

Professional ratings
Review scores
Source	Rating
AllMusic	3.5/5 stars

The Cold Nose is the debut album by Department of Eagles. It has been reissued twice. It was originally released in the US as The Whitey On The Moon UK LP on Isota Records on October 21, 2003, and reissued in the UK as The Cold Nose on Melodic Records on January 8, 2008. The American Dust October 7, 2008 US reissue contains four bonus tracks. The album is sample-heavy and multilayered. The second track, "Sailing By Night," contains a sample of the song "Meetings Along The Edge" from the Philip Glass and Ravi Shankar project Passages, as well as a sample from the Yellow Magic Orchestra track, Rydeen. The third track "Noam Chomsky Spring Break 2002" samples the Regina Spektor song "Prisoners". It also samples Astor Piazzolla's composition "Oblivion" in the opening and closing sequences. The track "We Have to Respect Each Other" samples Shooby Taylor, the human horn, while the opening to "Forty Dollar Rug" samples "Il Teatrino Delle Suore" from Nino Rota's soundtrack to Giulietta Degli Spiriti. The track "Gravity's Greatest Victory/Rex Snorted Cocaine" contains a sample of the John Williams composition "The Little People Work" from the soundtrack to Star Wars: A New Hope.

== Track listing ==
1. "On Glaze" - 1:51
2. "Sailing by Night" - 4:35
3. "Noam Chomsky Spring Break 2002" - 3:15
4. "The Piano in the Bathtub" - 4:23
5. "Romo-Goth" - 2:40
6. "Gravity's Greatest Victory/Rex Snorted Coke" - 2:29
7. "Origin of Love" - 2:00
8. "Family Romance" - 4:19
9. "Forty Dollar Rug" - 3:15
10. "We Have to Respect Each Other" - 0:38
11. "The Curious Butterfly Realizes He Is Beautiful" - 2:53
12. "The Horse You Ride" - 4:20
13. "Ghost in Summer Clothes" - 3:55
  bonus tracks on American Dust reissue
14. "Dinner for Two" - 2:05
15. "Day School/Rooster" - 3:50
16. "Mining for Gold/Payoff" - 2:31
17. "Ghost in Summer Clothes (demo)" - 4:15
