= Miles Benjamin Anthony Robinson (album) =

Studio album by Miles Benjamin Anthony Robinson
- Released: June 10, 2008
- Recorded: 2006
- Genre: Folk rock
- Length: 43:16
- Label: Say Hey; Transgressive
- Producer: Christopher Taylor; Miles Benjamin Anthony Robinson

Miles Benjamin Anthony Robinson chronology
Miles Benjamin Anthony Robinson (2008)	Summer of Fear (2009)

Professional ratings
Review scores
Source	Rating
AllMusic	2.5/5 stars
DIY	4.5/5 stars
NME	4/5 stars
Pitchfork	7.5
Spin	4/5 stars
The Fly	4/5
The Line of Best Fit	86/100%
The Observer	4/5 stars
The Skinny	4/5 stars

Miles Benjamin Anthony Robinson is the self-titled debut studio album by American musician Miles Benjamin Anthony Robinson. It was released on June 10, 2008 via Say Hey/Transgressive Records. Originally recorded, produced and arranged with Chris Taylor in 2006, it features contributions by Daniel Rossen, Christopher Bear and Kyp Malone.

== Track listing ==
No.	Title	Length
1.	"Buriedfed"	4:50
2.	"The Debtor"	4:14
3.	"Woodfriend"	3:17
4.	"Who's Laughing?"	5:06
5.	"The Ongoing Debate Concerning Present vs. Future"	4:22
6.	"My Good Luck"	4:37
7.	"Written Over"	2:43
8.	"Mountaineerd"	5:27
9.	"Above the Sun"	3:40
10.	"Boneindian"	4:59

== Personnel ==
- Miles Benjamin Anthony Robinson — songwriter, vocals, guitar, organ, keyboards, kazoo, arranger, producer
- Chris Taylor — vocals, bass, glockenspiel, woodwind, arranger, producer, recording
- Christopher Bear — lap steel guitar, drums, percussion
- Daniel Rossen — guest appearance
- Kyp Malone — guest appearance
