= Miles Benjamin Anthony Robinson =

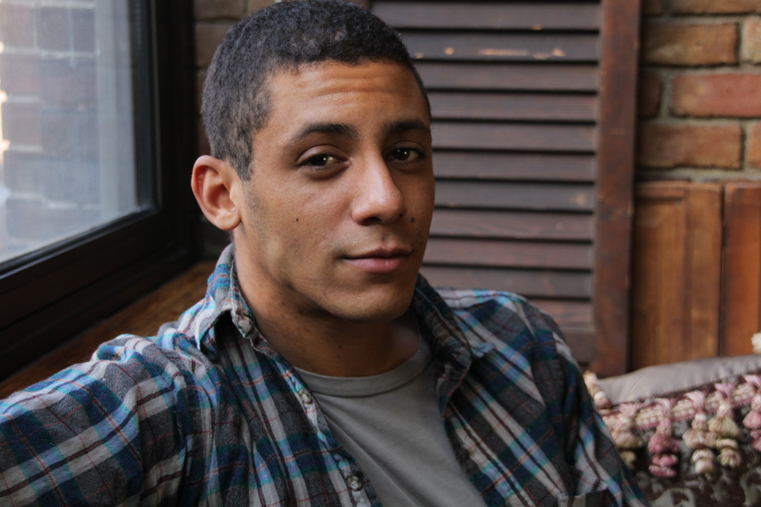

Background information
- Born: 30 October 1982 (age 43); Oregon
- Genres: Indie rock, folk rock
- Instruments: Vocals, guitar
- Labels: Say Hey Records, Saddle Creek Records
- Website: Say Hey Records page

Miles Benjamin Anthony Robinson (born October 30, 1982, in Oregon) is a Brooklyn-based singer-songwriter.

== Biography ==
Miles was raised in Portland and Eugene. He spent much of his youth on the road traveling with his comedian/playwright father as he played venues across the U.S. In high school, he began playing guitar and writing songs. After a brief move to California, Miles went to New York City in 2000. He attended New York University and graduated from Tisch School of the Arts in 2004.

=== Musical career ===
Miles's eponymous first LP, originally recorded, produced and arranged in 2006 with Chris Taylor of Grizzly Bear, was released on July 1, 2008. The album features contributions by Grizzly Bear's Daniel Rossen and Christopher Bear and TV on the Radio's Kyp Malone.

Miles signed with Saddle Creek Records on August 12, 2009. His second LP Summer Of Fear was produced by Malone and released on October 20, 2009. The same year Miles was chosen as one of Beyond Race Magazine's "50 Emerging Artists", resulting in a spot in their #11 issue as well as a full-length Q&A on their website.

Miles has not yet released further albums under his own name, but since 2017 has been in the duo Drug Couple with his partner Becca Robinson.

== Solo discography ==
- Miles Benjamin Anthony Robinson (Say Hey Records, 2008)
- Summer Of Fear (Saddle Creek Records, 2009)
