= Milk Famous =

Studio album by White Rabbits
- Released: 6 March 2012
- Genre: Indie rock
- Length: 40:24
- Label: TBD Records, Mute

White Rabbits chronology
It's Frightening (2009)	Milk Famous (2012)

Professional ratings
Review scores
Source	Rating
AllMusic	4/5 stars
Consequence of Sound	C−
Pitchfork	5.6/10

Milk Famous is the third album by American indie rock band the White Rabbits. It was released on March 6, 2012, on TBD Records.

"I'm Not Me" 7'' vinyl includes B side "We're All Restless"

== Track listing ==
1. "Heavy Metal" (4:27)
2. "I'm Not Me" (3:37)
3. "Hold It to the Fire" (3:41)
4. "Everyone Can't Be Confused" (3:01)
5. "Temporary" (3:40)
6. "Are You Free" (3:14)
7. "It's Frightening" (2:51)
8. "Danny Come Inside" (4:21)
9. "Back for More" (4:05)
10. "The Day You Won the War" (3:20)
11. "I Had It Coming" (4:08)
