= Chris Taylor (Grizzly Bear musician) =

American singer-songwriter

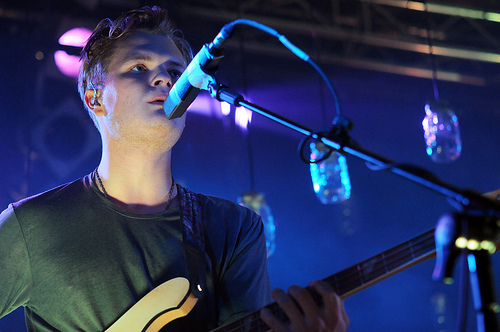
- Performing in Bristol, November 2009

Background information
- Also known as: CANT
- Born: Christopher Taylor; August 29, 1981 (age 44); Seattle, Washington, U.S.
- Instruments: Bass; vocals; clarinet; flute; saxophone; keyboards; guitar; accordion; whistling
- Labels: Terrible Records; Warp
- Website: Grizzly Bear website

Christopher Taylor (born August 29, 1981) is an American multi-instrumentalist and record producer. He is best known as the bass guitarist, backing vocalist and producer of the Brooklyn-based indie rock band Grizzly Bear, with whom he has recorded four studio albums. Taylor also records solo material under the moniker CANT, releasing his debut album, Dreams Come True, in 2011.

Acting as Grizzly Bear's regular producer, Taylor has also produced albums for Dirty Projectors, Department of Eagles, Miles Benjamin Anthony Robinson, Twin Shadow, Kishi Bashi and The Morning Benders.

== Biography ==
Christopher Taylor was born in Seattle, Washington, and grew up in the Bothell, Washington/Mill Creek, Washington area. He went to Henry M. Jackson High School in Mill Creek. Taylor is a 2004 graduate of New York University, and once worked in a coffee shop with TV on the Radio members Kyp Malone and David Sitek.

He joined Grizzly Bear following their first release, Horn of Plenty (2004). His contributions to the band's sound since then have varied, and he has become the band's producer since their second album, Yellow House (2006). In live performances, Taylor frequently switches between playing the bass, clarinet, flute, saxophone and sometimes the accordion. He also contributes vocals on most songs and does some whistling too.

== CANT and Terrible Records ==
In mid-2009 Taylor founded Terrible Records with label partner Ethan Silverman. He has also released his own solo material which (under the moniker CANT) on the label. His debut solo album, Dreams Come True, was released September 13, 2011.

== Discography ==
- Arthur Russell - Love is Overtaking Me - mixing, editing and restoration
- Canon Blue - Colonies - mastering
- Department of Eagles - In Ear Park - co-producer, electric bass, flute, woodwinds, effects
- Dirty Projectors - Rise Above - co-producer
- Grizzly Bear - Yellow House - producer, bass guitar, vocals, clarinet, flute, saxophone, electronics and treatments
- Grizzly Bear - Friend EP - producer, vocals
- Grizzly Bear - Veckatimest - producer, bass guitar, vocals
- Grizzly Bear - Shields - producer, vocals, bass, synths, saxophones, clarinet, bass clarinet, flutes, drum machine, the wheel
- Grizzly Bear - Painted Ruins
- Miles Benjamin Anthony Robinson - Self-titled - producer
- CANT - Dreams Come True - vocals, instrumentation, producer
- CANT/Arthur Russell - Split 7" - producer
- Acrylics - All of the Fire EP - producer
- Liima - 1982 - producer
- The Morning Benders - Big Echo - producer
- Nat Baldwin - Most Valuable Player - producer
- TV on the Radio - Return to Cookie Mountain - horns, clarinet
- Twin Shadow - Forget - producer
- Kishi Bashi - Sonderlust - producer
- Empress Of - Systems - producer
