= Summer of Fear (album) =

Studio album by Miles Benjamin Anthony Robinson
- Released: October 20, 2009
- Recorded: 2007–09
- Studio: Atlantic Sound Studios (Brooklyn, NY); Stay Gold Studio (Brooklyn, NY)
- Genre: Indie rock
- Length: 1:03:20
- Label: Saddle Creek
- Producer: Kyp Malone; Miles Benjamin Anthony Robinson

Miles Benjamin Anthony Robinson chronology
Miles Benjamin Anthony Robinson (2008)	Summer of Fear (2009)

Professional ratings
Review scores
Source	Rating
Consequence of Sound	D
laut.de	3/5 stars
Pitchfork	4.8/10
PopMatters	7/10
Spin	8/10 marks

Summer of Fear is the second studio album by American musician Miles Benjamin Anthony Robinson. It was released on October 20, 2009 through Saddle Creek Records. Recording sessions took place at Atlantic Sound Studios and Stay Gold Studio in Brooklyn, New York. Production was handled by Kyp Malone and Miles Benjamin Anthony Robinson himself.

== Track listing ==
All tracks are written by Miles Benjamin Anthony Robinson.

No.	Title	Length
1.	"Shake a Shot"	3:23
2.	"Always an Anchor"	4:12
3.	"The Sound"	5:31
4.	"Hard Row"	3:28
5.	"Trap Door"	4:05
6.	"The 100th of March"	5:47
7.	"Summer of Fear, Pt. 1"	3:05
8.	"Gold and Grey" (digital bonus track)	5:02
9.	"Death by Dust"	4:36
10.	"Summer of Fear, Pt. 2"	5:28
11.	"Losing 4 Winners"	3:39
12.	"More Than a Mess"	11:34
13.	"Boat"	6:34
Total length:		1:03:20

== Personnel ==
- Miles Benjamin Anthony Robinson — songwriter, vocals, guitar, piano, organ, keyboards, percussion, producer, art direction
- David Morrin — vocals, lap steel guitar, Wurlitzer electric piano, piano, organ, mandolin
- Max Andrews — vocals, drums, percussion
- Jeff Knutsen — bass guitar (tracks: 2–9, 11, 13)
- Kyp Malone — vocals, cymbals, gong, producer
- Eleanor Everdell — vocals
- Sharon Van Etten — vocals
- Marquis T. Oliver — violin
- Stuart Bogie — alto saxophone, clarinet, jaw harp
- Eric Biondo — trumpet
- "Moist" Paula Henderson — baritone saxophone
- Dave Smith — trombone
- Christopher Bear — percussion
- Ryan Sawyer — additional snare, additional cymbals
- Deako — tracking
- Chris Moore — mixing and vocal tracking
- Dan Huron — vocal tracking and Pro Tools
- Chris Taylor — additional Pro Tools
- Kyle Boyd — assistant
- Steve Fallone — mastering
- Alicia J. Rose — photography
- Zack Nipper — layout
