= In Ear Park =

2008 album by the Department of Eagles

Studio album by Department of Eagles
- Released: October 7, 2008
- Recorded: "Balmy Night": January 2006, Berkeley, California; Other tracks: 2007–2008, Brooklyn, New York City, New York
- Genre: Psychedelic folk, indie folk
- Length: 42:18
- Label: 4AD
- Producer: Department of Eagles; Chris Taylor

Department of Eagles chronology
The Cold Nose (2003)	In Ear Park (2008)

Singles from In Ear Park
- 1. "No One Does It Like You / Too Little Too Late" Released: 2008

Professional ratings
Review scores
Source	Rating
Allmusic	4/5 stars
Drowned in Sound	(7/10)
The Phoenix	3.5/4 stars
Lost at Sea	(8.5/10)
The A.V. Club	(B+)
Pitchfork Media	(8.3/10)
The Observer	4/5 stars
Rolling Stone	3/5 stars
Mojo	4/5 stars

In Ear Park is the second album by Department of Eagles. It was released by 4AD on October 7, 2008. The inspiration for the album is noted to come from Daniel Rossen's childhood experiences, most notably memories of those related to his father. The album is dedicated to his father, who died in 2007. In an interview for a 4AD DUMBO Session, Rossen reflected on the inspiration for the title of the album, quoting, "It was a nickname for a park that I used to go to with my dad, when I was a kid, and there was an interactive statue that looked like a giant ear...so we called it In Ear Park".

== Background and recording ==
The album was completed over several years and involved the use of unusual settings and techniques for demoing and recording. The closing track, "Balmy Night", was one of the earliest songs to be completed. Nicolaus notes that "[Balmy Night] was one of the first songs that was written for this album, and [the album] took so long to make and this was kind of the one thing we had going. And so every time I think would get depressed about this album not happening, I would listen to this song so, it's special".

The majority of the album was recorded in a church, something that Grizzly Bear would adopt for their then upcoming album, Veckatimest. On working to the strengths of the church, Nicolaus states:

We actually didn't record it in a traditional studio, we recorded in a church in Brooklyn that Grizzly Bear uses for a space, and there's a huge amount of natural reverb. [...] Most people when they get reverb in a studio, it's through a pedal but in this case, we couldn't actually get it out of the recording, just because you're basically recording drums in a cavern. So I think the church played a huge part. There's just sounds of us kind of running around. Like one of the tracks has Chris Bear running up and down the stairs of the church with leather shoes on, and one of the tracks has the organ turning on and off. It's definitely part of the record in an interesting way.

Demos for the album were built up through Rossen and Nicolaus emailing song ideas back and forth. Rossen notes that they had been "passing around demos on email for years, pretty much since [they] met each other." Nicolaus remarks:

It works pretty well. A lot of times [...] I would come up with a really basic idea and send it to Dan via email and he would extrapolate and build on it and send it back to me. And I might have an idea might trade back and forth like that, actually almost for a couple years weirdly because this record took a long time to make. A song like "No One Does It Like You" for example, went through maybe six different versions before we kind of arrived at the sort of Phil Spector version that we got to today, so kind of a fun process.

Rossen noted that some ideas on the album were rejected from Grizzly Bear, as he felt they were not suited to the sound at the time.

They just didn't fit to me with the tone of the new Grizzly Bear songs that were doing, and they seemed to work all together as one little whole work. [...] Those were the songs that were sort of interrelated that had to do with nostalgia and childhood and so on and those kind of all fit together in one little piece, so it sort of made sense, at least for this record.

== Track listing ==
All tracks are written by Daniel Rossen and Fred Nicolaus.

No.	Title	Length
1.	"In Ear Park"	4:02
2.	"No One Does It Like You"	3:56
3.	"Phantom Other"	4:40
4.	"Teenagers"	3:06
5.	"Around the Bay"	5:07
6.	"Herringbone"	3:18
7.	"Classical Records"	2:49
8.	"Waves of Rye"	4:24
9.	"Therapy Car Noise"	1:50
10.	"Floating on the Lehigh"	6:06
11.	"Balmy Night"	2:54
12.	"Vague Entitled" (Borders bonus track)	1:33
13.	"Green Rocky Road" (iTunes bonus track)	2:21
14.	"What Can Be Done" (Amazon bonus track)	1:53

Published by Ear Park Music, BMI, 2008.

== Chart positions ==
Chart	Peak position
Billboard 200 (U.S.)	166
Top Independent Albums	27
Top Heatseekers	3

== Personnel ==
=== Department of Eagles ===
- Daniel Rossen: vocals, guitars, banjo, pianos, samples
- Fred Nicolaus: vocals, aux percussion, piano, samples

=== Guest musicians ===
- Chris Taylor: electric bass, flute, woodwinds, effects
- Christopher Bear: drums, samples
- Nat Baldwin: double bass

=== Production team ===
- Chris Taylor: engineer and mixer; record producer for tracks 1–10
- Jeff Saltzman: engineer for "Balmy Night"
- Steve Hall: mastering
