= White Rabbits (band) =

American indie rock band

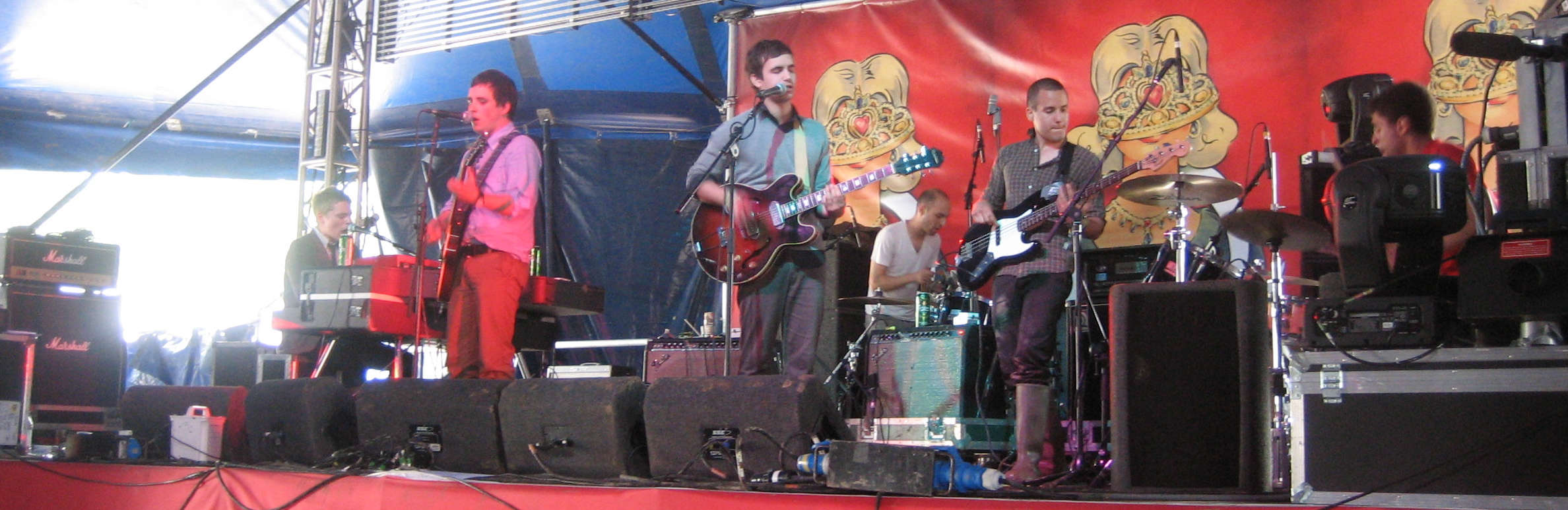
- The White Rabbits at Glastonbury 2007

Background information
- Origin: Columbia, Missouri, United States
- Genres: Indie rock, indie-pop, psychedelic pop, post-punk, lo-fi
- Years active: 2004–2014(hiatus)
- Labels: TBD Records, MapleMusic Recordings (Canada), Say Hey Records, Mute,
- Members: Stephen Patterson; Gregory Roberts; Alex Even; Matt Clark; Jamie Levinson; Rustine Bragaw
- Past members: Adam Russell; Brian Betancourt
- Website: tbdrecords.com/artists/white-rabbits/

White Rabbits is an American six-piece indie rock band based in Brooklyn, New York, originally from Columbia, Missouri. The band released its debut studio album, Fort Nightly, on May 22, 2007. Their second album, It's Frightening, was released on May 19, 2009. They released their third album, Milk Famous, on March 6, 2012. The band is signed to TBD Records.

== History ==
The band formed in Columbia, Missouri. The band's frontmen, Greg Roberts and Stephen Patterson, met at the college in 2004. Alex Even, Adam Russell and Greg had formerly played in the band Texas Chainsaw Mass Choir. The original White Rabbits lineup consisted of five members, but after relocating to New York City the next year, the band expanded to six members. The sixth member, Jamie Levinson, had grown up on the same street as Roberts in Webster Groves, Missouri. Roberts and Levinson both played in a ska band (called The Hubcaps) while in high school.

The White Rabbits recorded its first studio album, Fort Nightly, and released it in 2007 to the public through Say Hey Records. The album was praised by critics.

In addition to consistent touring, they have been featured on NPR's World Cafe, where the band members discussed how they met and formed in the college town of Columbia, Missouri. They also talked about their early sound and performed three songs. They have also performed on the Late Show with David Letterman.

On May 12, 2009, the band released their second album, titled It's Frightening. The album was produced by Britt Daniel, lead singer and guitarist of Spoon (whom they asked after meeting the band while on tour in Minneapolis). Retrieved on February 16, 2009 The album was released on TBD Records, which also hosts the bands Radiohead and Underworld. The band also worked with Nicholas Vernhes at the Rare Book Room.

Their third album, titled Milk Famous, was released on March 6, 2012. The band entered a hiatus following the end of the tour in support of the album in December 2012. They reunited for a one-off show at Brooklyn's Cameo Gallery on June 15, 2014. Stephen Patterson and Greg Roberts played drums and bass guitar, respectively, in the touring band of former The Walkmen frontman Hamilton Leithauser in 2016 and 2017, with Patterson playing drums again for Leithauser in January 2020.

Patterson released a self-recorded album Out of Action on 20 January 2022.

== Live shows ==
White Rabbits are known for their energy onstage, their switching of instruments, and cover songs, notably Bob Dylan's "Maggie's Farm", which was also covered by one of the band's main influences, The Specials. Typically they will put their own twist on cover songs by playing them in a style/genre that is different from the original. After playing a particularly energetic show at South By Southwest in 2008, NME named them one of the top three bands performing that year.

They have toured with bands such as The Walkmen, Richard Swift, Interpol and Spoon. In 2007, they began a national tour with the Kaiser Chiefs in support of their album Fort Nightly. This followed a tour through the United Kingdom. In 2010 the band went on tour with Interpol.

White Rabbits also performed at the 2010 Coachella Valley Music and Arts Festival on Saturday, April 17, 2010 on the main stage. The following day, Stephen Patterson, along with Deerhunter frontman Bradford Cox, joined Spoon during their set for "Who Makes Your Money."

White Rabbits played at the 2010 Austin City Limits Music Festival and the 2010 Voodoo Music Experience in New Orleans Halloween weekend, and opened for Muse at London's Wembley Stadium on September 10, 2010. On October 29, 2010 they were the opening act for Interpol at the Verizon Wireless Theatre in Houston, TX.

They played on the BBC show Later... with Jools Holland, where they performed "Percussion Gun" and "They Done Wrong/We Done Wrong".

In 2012, they toured with The Shins.

== Discography ==
=== Studio albums ===
Title	Album details	Peak chart positions				
Title	Album details	US	US Heat	US Indie	US Rock	UK
Fort Nightly	Released: May 22, 2007; Label: Say Hey Records	—	—	—	—	—
It's Frightening	Released: May 12, 2009; Label: TBD Records, Mute	184	6	31	—	188
Milk Famous	Released: March 6, 2012; Label: TBD Records, Mute	—	6	30	46	—
"—" denotes album that did not chart or was not released

=== Extended plays ===
- "White Rabbits Daytrotter Sessions" (7/16/2007, Daytrotter)
- "White Rabbits Daytrotter Sessions" (11/2/2009, Daytrotter)

=== Singles ===
Title	Year	Peak chart positions				Album
Title	Year	US Alt.	US Rock	UK Sales	UK Indie	Album
"The Plot"	2007	—	—	—	—	Fort Nightly
"Cotillion Blues"	2007	—	—	—	—	Non-album single
"While We Go Dancing"	2008	—	—	81	14	Fort Nightly
"Percussion Gun"	2009	31	50	51	—	It's Frightening
"Lionesse"	2009	—	—	—	—	It's Frightening
"The Salesman (Tramp Life)"	2010	—	—	—	—	It's Frightening
"They Done Wrong / We Done Wrong"	2010	—	—	—	—	It's Frightening
"I'm Not Me"	2012	—	—	73	—	Milk Famous
"Heavy Metal"	2012	—	—	—	—	Milk Famous
"Temporary"	2012	—	—	—	—	Milk Famous
"—" denotes a recording that did not chart or was not released in that territory.

=== Live recordings ===
- "White Rabbits: Live [In Spaceland - June 13, 2007]" (2007, Spaceland Recordings)
- "Live at Lollapalooza 2007: White Rabbits - EP" (2007)

== Members ==
- Stephen Patterson – vocals, piano
- Alexander Even – guitar, vocals
- Matthew Clark – drums, additional percussion
- Jamie Levinson – drums
- Gregory Roberts – vocals, guitar
- Rustine Bragaw - bass

=== Former members ===
- Adam Russell – bass
- Brian Betancourt – bass
