= Summer of Fear =

Summer of Fear may refer to:

- Summer of Fear (novel), a 1976 novel by Lois Duncan
- Stranger in Our House, or Summer of Fear, a 1978 American film, based on the novel
- Summer of Fear (1996 film), an American film
- Summer of Fear (album), an album by Miles Benjamin Anthony Robinson
