= No One Does It Like You =

Single by Department of Eagles

from the album In Ear Park
- B-side: "Too Little Too Late"
- Released: August 6, 2008
- Recorded: Brooklyn, NY; 2007 - 2008
- Genre: Rock
- Length: 3:56
- Label: 4AD
- Songwriters: Daniel Rossen, Fred Nicolaus
- Producers: Chris Taylor, Department of Eagles

Music video
- "No One Does It Like You" on YouTube (posted by 4AD)

"No One Does It Like You" is a single by Department of Eagles from their 2008 album, In Ear Park. The B-side is a cover of the 2006 JoJo single, "Too Little Too Late". The 7" vinyl release of the single was available for free to people who have pre-ordered In Ear Park online. The single was later released digitally on June 9, 2009.

The song uses a sample of The Ronettes' song "You Baby" for the drum beat. It was covered by indie band Feed Me Jack on their 2012 album Chumpfrey.

== Music video ==
The music video for "No One Does It Like You" was produced by The Directors Bureau and co-directed by Patrick Daughters and Marcel Dzama, with production and costume design by Dzama. It premiered at the Museum of Modern Art as part of the venue's ongoing PopRally series on 24 March 2009. Daughters and Dzama had originally planned to collaborate on a project for Arcade Fire but that project fell through due to a lack of sufficient funds. Daughters was approached first by Department of Eagles, and it was he who introduced Dzama to the project.

== Track listing ==
Digital download
No.	Title	Writer(s)	Length
1.	"No One Does It Like You"	Daniel Rossen, Fred Nicolaus	3:56
2.	"Too Little Too Late"	Billy Steinberg, Josh Alexander, Ruth-Anne Cunningham	4:10

== Release history ==
Region	Date	Format	Ref.
United States	August 6, 2008	7"	
United States	June 9, 2009	Digital download	
