= In the Hollows =

Studio album by Nat Baldwin
- Released: 29 April 2014
- Genre: Alternative rock
- Length: 44:00
- Label: Western Vinyl
- Producer: Nat Baldwin

Nat Baldwin chronology
People Changes (2011)	In the Hollows (2014)

Professional ratings
Aggregate scores
Source	Rating
Metacritic	73
Review scores
Source	Rating
Allmusic	4/5 stars
Pitchfork Media	5.7/10
music OMH	4/5 stars
The Line of Best Fit	7/10 stars

In the Hollows is the sixth solo album by bassist Nat Baldwin. It was released on 29 April 2014 by Western Vinyl Records.

== Track listing ==
All songs written by Nat Baldwin.

1. "Wasted" – 5:20
2. "Knockout" – 4:38
3. "Half My Life" – 3:17
4. "In the Hollows" – 5:36
5. "The End of the Night" – 3:37
6. "Cosmos Pose" – 5:17
7. "Sharpshooter" – 6:10
8. "Bored to Death" – 4:55
9. "A Good Day to Die" – 5:10

== Personnel ==
- Nat Baldwin – bass, vocals
- Otto Hauser – drums, percussion
- Clarice Jensen – cello
- Rob Moose – violin
- Nadia Sirota – viola
