= It's Frightening =

Studio album by White Rabbits
- Released: May 19, 2009
- Genre: Indie rock
- Length: 34:42
- Labels: TBD Records, Mute
- Producer: Britt Daniel

White Rabbits chronology
Fort Nightly (2007)	It's Frightening (2009)	Milk Famous (2012)

Professional ratings
Review scores
Source	Rating
AllMusic	3.5/5 stars
BBC	(unfavourable)
Drowned In Sound	6/10 stars
Rolling Stone	3.5/5 stars
Pitchfork Media	7.4/10

It's Frightening is the second album by the American indie rock band, the White Rabbits. It was released May 19, 2009 on TBD Records, with "Percussion Gun" being the first single.

The album was produced by Britt Daniel of Spoon and mixed by Mike McCarthy.

The songs "Right Where They Left" and "Percussion Gun" were used in the teen drama Gossip Girl (episode title: Dr. Estrangeloved). "Percussion Gun" was also featured on EA Sports game, 2010 FIFA World Cup South Africa.

The 7'' single of "Percussion Gun" has B-side "Foxhunting"

== Track listing ==
It's Frightening track listing
No.	Title	Length
1.	"Percussion Gun"	3:08
2.	"Rudie Fails"	3:24
3.	"They Done Wrong / We Done Wrong"	4:30
4.	"Lionesse"	3:10
5.	"Company I Keep"	4:10
6.	"The Salesman (Tramp Life)"	2:50
7.	"Midnight and I"	3:34
8.	"Right Where They Left"	3:29
9.	"The Lady Vanishes"	3:29
10.	"Leave It at the Door"	3:00
Total length:		34:42
