= Dreams Come True (CANT album) =

Studio album by CANT
- Released: September 13, 2011
- Recorded: A bedroom at Glenn Tonche; Terrible Studios
- Genre: Experimental rock, art rock, electronica
- Label: Terrible Records (US); Warp (International)
- Producer: Chris Taylor

Dreams Come True is the debut studio album by American experimental rock project CANT, released on September 13, 2011, on Terrible Records and Warp. Recorded and produced by Grizzly Bear bass guitarist Chris Taylor, the album is primarily a solo album with contributions from Twin Shadow's George Lewis Jr.

Regarding the decision to record a solo album, Taylor noted, "Between producing records for other bands and writing records with my band, I think I started to feel this need to pursue something that was just something that I was interested in, that I didn’t have to discuss with other people. I just didn’t want to deal with compromising."

== Background and recording ==
After extensive touring in support of Grizzly Bear's third studio album, Veckatimest (2009), the band undertook a hiatus from band-related activities. During this time, bassist and producer Chris Taylor began working on solo material, stating, "I felt like doing something where I could pursue my own angle on things. [Dreams Come True]'s a fairly different-sounding record from Grizzly Bear."

During the writing and recording of Dreams Come True, Taylor collaborated with Twin Shadow's George Lewis Jr., with Taylor noting, "I had absolutely no idea what the record would end up sounding like. [...] I just kind of threw myself into this thing: I wrote three-quarters of the record in a week-and-a-half with George Twin Shadow." Regarding his contributions, Taylor stated, "I love the way George makes his things. His take on pop music is really impressive, really 'up my alley'. I just really enjoy how he approaches music, and it seemed like it was really in line with what kind of music I was into at the time, and what I was hoping to do myself."

The resulting recordings differed from Taylor's work with Grizzly Bear, with Taylor noting, "It's just such different music. Which is what I wanted to do, of course, but it still shocked me when I came out with it. I felt very new to me. I didn't know how to make sense of it, at first. It was challenging. But I like a good challenge."

== Writing and composition ==
Regarding the album's lyrical content, Chris Taylor noted, "I just wanted to do something different: exploring different types of making music, different ways of writing lyrics. With each song I decided I would try and tell a specific story. I really like lyricist who can tell stories: Neil Young, Otis Redding, The-Dream. [...] I was dealing with some tough stuff. So, the fact that it came out sounding on the dark and dissonant wasn't something that was surprising to me; but I wasn't trying to make a dark record as much as I was trying to make something that felt like a release."

== Reception ==
Professional ratings
Aggregate scores
Source	Rating
Metacritic	67/100
Review scores
Source	Rating
Allmusic	4/5 stars
Drowned in Sound	(7/10)
Pitchfork	(6.1)

Allmusic's Gregory Heaney gave the album a positive review, stating, "What’s really special here is that Taylor is always able to keep things from getting abrasive, allowing the album to swirl around listeners without pushing them away. This focus on approachability over impenetrability makes Dreams Come True not only a welcoming debut, but a fantastic entry point into the more experimental side of electronic music." Drowned in Sound issued the album with a positive review, stating, "At its heart CANT feels more like a bedroom pop project, trading grandiosity for the introverted, and the collective for the personal. Having heard Taylor’s fingerprints over a dozen fine records, it’s great to finally hear one that he can call his own."

Pitchfork Media gave the album a mixed review, stating, "There's a nagging feeling that the aesthetic compositions here are like bubbles - they float by with solid-looking, effervescent charm, but burst upon closer inspection." However, they praised the album's final two tracks, noting "The record is most gripping at its last breath: The end of "Rises Silent" and "Bericht" find Taylor alone with a piano, shorn of the stylistic trickery. The result is disarmingly tender, adding a few heartfelt minutes of warmth and personal connection, something lacking in the rest of Dreams' gloss."

== Track listing ==
1. "Too Late, Too Far"
2. "Believe"
3. "The Edge"
4. "BANG"
5. "(brokencollar)"
6. "She Found a Way Out"
7. "Answer"
8. "Dreams Come True"
9. "Rises Silent"
10. "Bericht"

== Personnel ==
=== CANT ===
- Chris Taylor - all vocals, various instruments
- George Lewis Jr. - various instruments

=== Additional musicians ===
- Thomas Hedlund - additional drums and percussion (1, 2 and 9)
- Guillermo E. Brown - additional percussion (9)
- Dave Treut - additional drums (9)
- Aaron Parks - piano (9 and 10)

=== Recording personnel ===
- Chris Taylor - producer, recording, mixing
- Jake Aron - assistant mixing engineer

=== Artwork ===
- Nick Kapros - photography
- Samantha West - photography
- Drew Heffron - design
