= Awesome Color =

American musical trio

- Origin: Brooklyn, New York, United States
- Genres: Garage rock revival, alternative rock
- Years active: 2004–2010
- Labels: Ecstatic Peace! American Dust
- Members: Michael Troutman; Allison Busch; Derek Stanton

Awesome Color was a musical trio formed in Brooklyn in 2004. They disbanded in 2010.

== History ==
The band was formed by Michigan natives Michael Troutman (a.k.a. Michael Awesome), Allison Busch (a.k.a. Allison Awesome), and Derek Stanton (a.k.a. Derek Awesome) in Brooklyn, New York, in 2004. Inspired by Detroit garage rock, they came to the attention of Thurston Moore, who signed the band to his Ecstatic Peace label. They released a self-titled debut album in 2006, which was followed by a second album, Electric Aborigines in 2008, both released by Ecstatic Peace. (Vinyl editions for both albums were released by American Dust.) The first album drew comparisons with the Stooges (with Stylus Magazine going as far as saying "there are times when you could play Fun House and this album back-to-back and not be able to tell the difference between the two") as did Electric Aborigines, although this album expanded the band's sound and drew comparisons with The Scientists and Spacemen 3. The band were described by Rolling Stone as sounding like "a grimier version of Sonic Youth". In 2007, the song ¨Hat Energy¨ from the album Awesome Color appeared in the film I Know Who Killed Me, starring Lindsay Lohan. After the second album, the band toured the world in support of Sonic Youth and Dinosaur Jr. during 2008. They recorded and released Massa Hypnos on April 6, 2010. They toured to promote it with Tyvek and Hair Police.

In early 2008, the band released a video for the single "Eyes of Light" directed by The Wilderness

After the breakup of Awesome Color, Stanton returned to Detroit and started the band Turn to Crime.

== Albums ==
- Awesome Color (2006), Ecstatic Peace
- Electric Aborigines (2008), Ecstatic Peace
- Massa Hypnos (2010), Ecstatic Peace
