= Department of Eagles =

American band

- Also known as: Whitey on the Moon UK
- Origin: New York City, New York, U.S.
- Genres: Indie folk; indietronica
- Years active: 2000–present
- Labels: Isota; Melodic; 4AD; American Dust; Bella Union
- Members: Daniel Rossen; Fred Nicolaus

Department of Eagles is an American duo formed in New York in 2000, consisting of Daniel Rossen and Fred Nicolaus.

== History ==
The band was formed in 2000 by Rossen and Nicolaus, who were friends and New York University (NYU) roommates. They created music from collected samples, assembled into songs and recorded with unlicensed recording software and a microphone borrowed from their neighbor, Chris Taylor, who later became Rossen's bandmate in Grizzly Bear, as well as Department of Eagles' producer and recording engineer.

Initially, Rossen and Nicolaus planned on distributing their dorm room beats-and-samples CD only among friends, but they ended up releasing some of these early tracks on two limited-edition vinyl singles on California-based independent label Isota Records. They recorded additional tracks for these singles and for their debut album with producer Jeff Saltzman, the father of a friend from NYU. Saltzman went on to produce Hot Fuss, the debut CD by The Killers.

During this period the duo went by the tongue-in-cheek name Whitey on the Moon UK. However, to avoid a dispute with a San Francisco-based band of the same name (excepting the UK), they changed their name to "Department of Eagles" before the release of their debut full-length CD. The Whitey on the Moon UK LP saw release on Isota Records in 2003.

In 2004 Rossen began writing more folk-based material and experimenting with layered vocals, and in late 2004 he joined Grizzly Bear. The following summer they recorded their first album as a four-piece, Yellow House. In the meantime, Fred Nicolaus continued to write and pass demos to Rossen. In January 2006, the band began work on a second LP in Berkeley, California. Though the sessions were ultimately deemed a failure, much of the resulting material can be found on the Archive 2003-2006 collection, released in 2010.

In 2007 the band began a second attempt at a new record in New York, this time with Daniel's Grizzly Bear bandmates Christopher Bear, and Chris Taylor. This album, In Ear Park, was released by 4AD on October 7, 2008. They described the new material as sounding like Van Dyke Parks, Randy Newman, and Paul McCartney.

In 2008, the duo recorded a cover of JoJo's song "Too Little Too Late" as a birthday present for Grizzly Bear frontman Edward Droste. They played "No One Does It Like You" live on Late Night with Conan O'Brien on October 1, 2008.

Their name is a reference to artist Marcel Broodthaers' Institutional Critique.

== Discography ==
=== LPs ===
- The Whitey on the Moon UK LP (2003) / *The Cold Nose (2005 UK reissue of The Whitey on the Moon UK LP)
- In Ear Park (2008)

=== EPs ===
- Mo' 'Tussin - the EP (as Whitey on the Moon UK) 7-inch single, Isota Records 2002
- The Noam Chomsky Spring Break EP (as Whitey on the Moon UK) 7-inch single, Isota Records 2003
- A Johnny Glaze Christmas: Classical Snatches and Samples a Go-Go 2003-2005 CD EP, Isota Records 2006

=== Singles ===
- "No One Does It Like You"/"Too Little Too Late" promo 7" single, 4AD 2008

=== Other ===
- Archive 2003-2006 CD and LP, American Dust / Bella Union (released July 20, 2010)
