= Jason Nazary =

American jazz musician

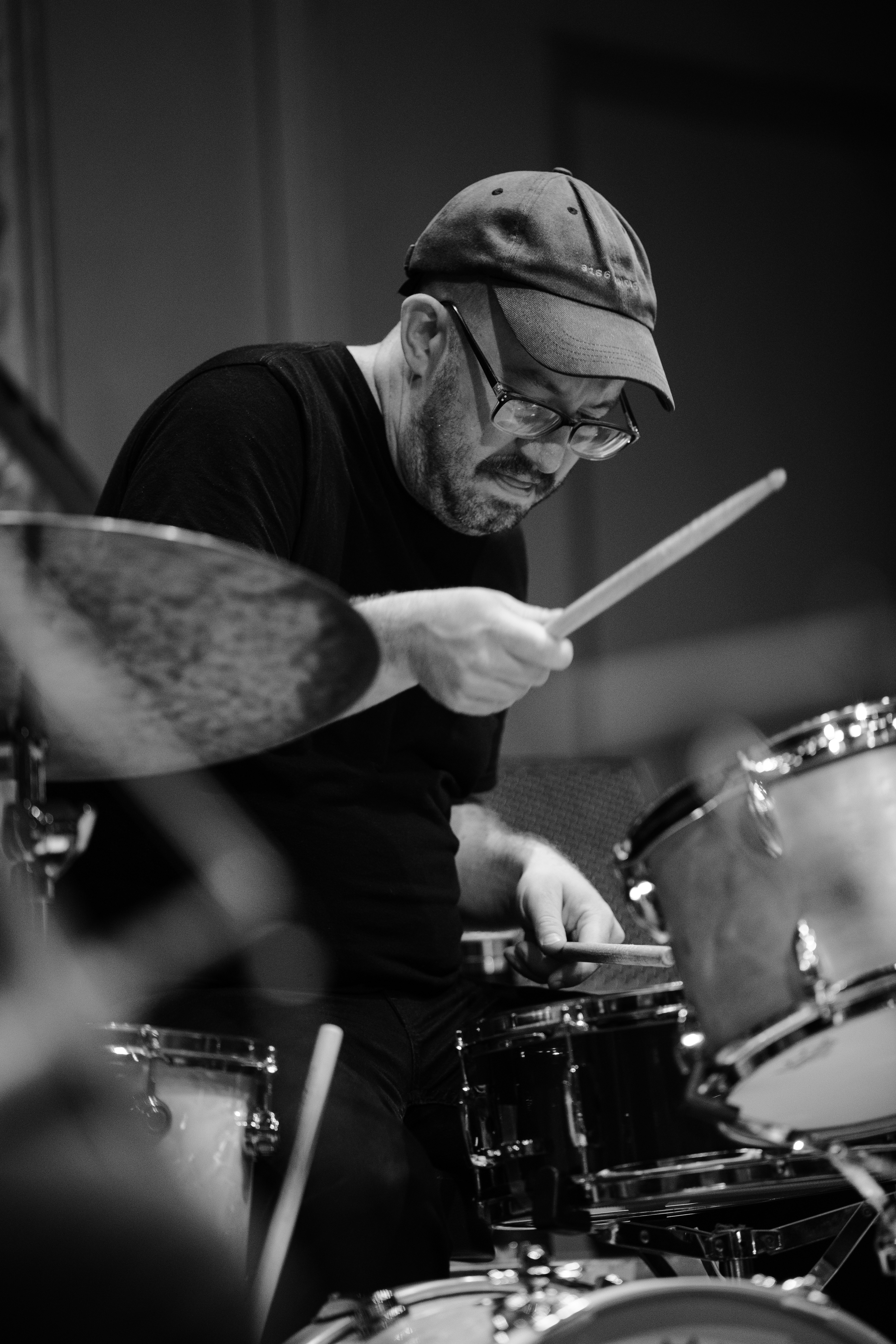
Jason Nazary, Arts for Art - Vision Festival 2024. Photo by Marek Lazarski

Jason Nazary (born January 24, 1984) is an American jazz and improvisational musician (drums and electronics). He was born in Aviano, Italy, while his father was in the US military, and grew up in the Atlanta, Georgia area. In 2002, he played in Betty Carter's Jazz Ahead concerts at the Kennedy Center in Washington, DC. He moved to New York City in 2005, and, as of 2019, he is based in Brooklyn, New York.

== Discography ==
Solo as So Ghost

- 2018: Companion II (Jass)
- 2019: Boss a Nova (Jass)

Solo

- 2021: Spring Collection (We Jazz Records)

With Little Women (Darius Jones, Travis Laplante, Jason Nazary)

- 2007: Teeth (Gilgongo Records), with Ben Greenberg
- 2010: Throat (AUM Fidelity), with Andrew Smiley
- 2013: Lung (AUM Fidelity), with Andrew Smiley

With Petr Cancura and Joe Morris

- 2008: Fine Objects (Not Two Records)

With Darius Jones Trio

- 2009: Man'ish Boy (A Raw & Beautiful Thing) (AUM Fidelity)
- 2011: Big Gurl (Smell My Dream) (AUM Fidelity)

With Noah Kaplan Quartet

- 2011: Descendants (hatOLOGY)
- 2017: Cluster Swerve (hatOLOGY)

With Chris Pitsiokos Quartet

- 2016: One Eye With A Microscope Attached (Eleatic Records)

With Terrie Ex (Hessels) and Jasper Stadhouders

- 2018: Live at Space is the Place (DOEK)

With Eli Wallace

- 2018: Slideshoe Junky I (Iluso)

With Clebs (Jason Nazary, Emilie Weibel)

- 2018: I'm Here (Jass)
- 2019: Fault Sequence (Thanksgiving Dump) (self released)

With Anteloper (Jaimie Branch, Jason Nazary)

- 2018: Kudu (International Anthem)
- 2020: Tour Beats Vol. 1 (International Anthem)

With Bloor

- 2019: Drolleries (Astral Spirits)

With Dim Thickets

- 2019: s/t (Anticausal Systems)
