= Noah K =

American composer, musician and producer

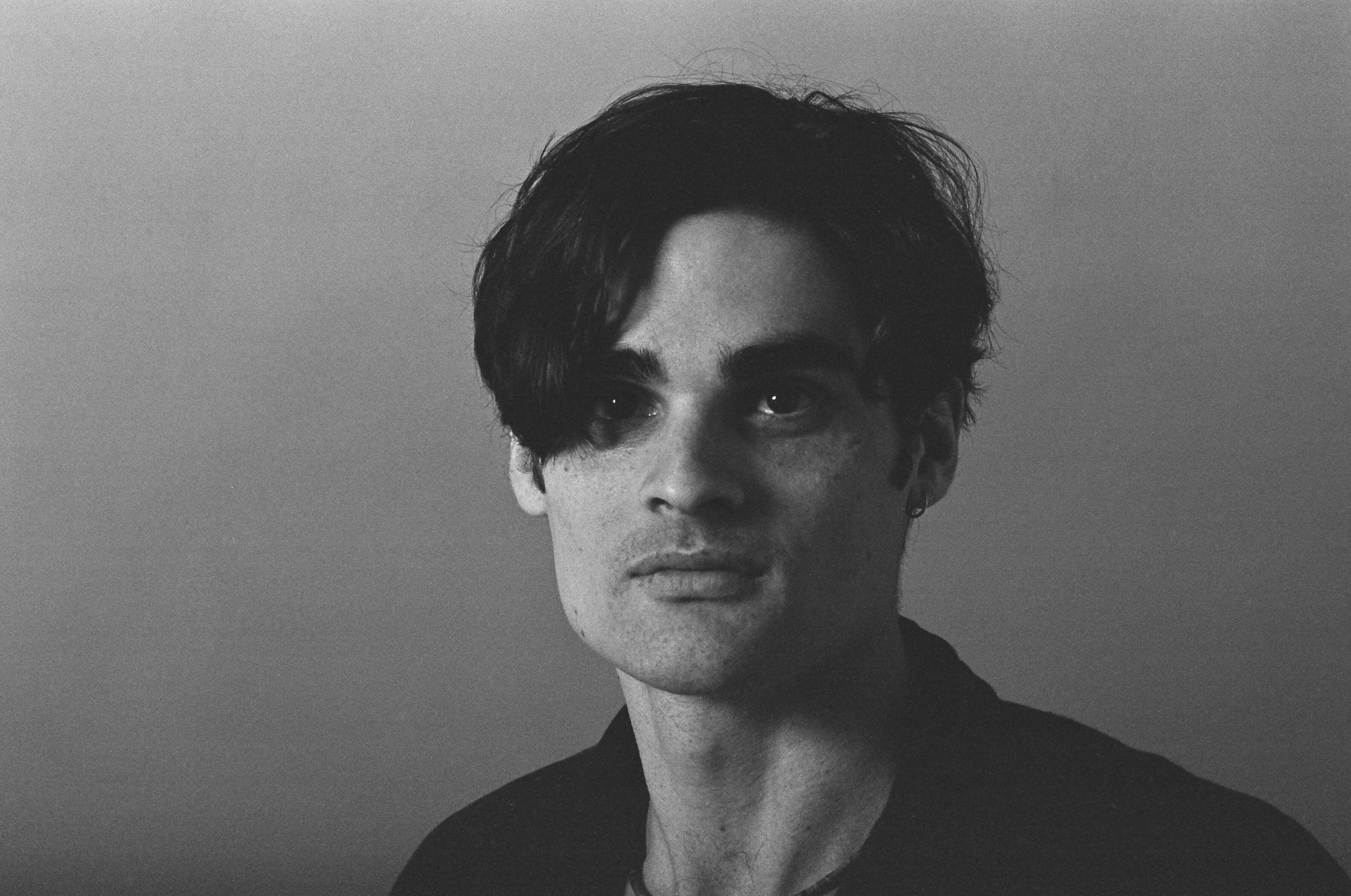
- K in Brooklyn, 2015

Background information
- Born: September 11, 1984 (age 41); Santa Monica, California, U.S.
- Genres: Avant-garde; dream pop; experimental; classical; jazz
- Occupations: Composer; Musician; Producer
- Instruments: Saxophone, keyboards
- Years active: 2008-present
- Labels: HatHut, Underwolf
- Website: www.noahkmusic.com

Noah Flynn Kaplan (born September 11, 1984), known professionally as Noah K, is an American composer, saxophonist, and record producer.

== Early life and education ==
K grew up in Topanga Canyon, California. During high school he performed jazz professionally throughout Los Angeles. In 2002, he composed and performed music on the ABC television series Once and Again. He is a graduate of the New England Conservatory of Music, where he studied with Joe Maneri and Jerry Bergonzi. He was Maneri's last student. After graduating, K moved to Brooklyn, New York, and traveled monthly to Framingham, Massachusetts for lessons in composition, theory, and improvisation with Maneri until Maneri's death in 2009. K received an MFA in Music Composition from Princeton University in 2015 where his advisor was Steven Mackey. In 2018 he was awarded the Harold W. Dodds Honorific Fellowship from the Princeton University Graduate School. He has been the recipient of composition fellowships from the Tanglewood Music Center and the New Jersey Symphony Orchestra. In 2022, he received a PhD in Music Composition from Princeton University. He has been visiting professor of music and adjunct professor at NYU's Gallatin School, where he co-founded the 4th Wave Music Intensive.

== Career ==
=== Dollshot ===
K co-leads the dream pop band Dollshot for which he writes music and performs. The band's eponymous debut album was released in 2011 and includes arrangements of songs by Arnold Schoenberg, Francis Poulenc and Charles Ives as well as original songs by Noah K and Wes Matthews. A music video for their song "Lalande", directed by Matt Mahurin, premiered on WNYC's Soundcheck in July 2017. A video for a second single, "Swan Gone", directed by Pablo Delcan, premiered on BlackBook in October 2018. In December 2018, Dollshot performed three songs from Lalande live on WNYC and were interviewed by Soundcheck host John Schaefer.

=== With Giacomo Merega ===
One of the musicians on Dollshot is bass guitarist Giacomo Merega, whom Noah K met when they were students in Boston. Their first recording, The Light and Other Things, was made in 2006; the band was a free improvisation trio that included David Tronzo on guitar. The pair also played on Watch the Walls Instead, another set of freely improvised performances, this time in trio, quartet, and quintet formats. They both played on trumpeter Joe Moffett's Ad Faunum and were co-leaders with Moffett on Crows and Motives, a set of improvised pieces that "arose between recording three-voice extracts from one of Renaissance composer Josquin des Prez's settings of L'homme armé."

=== Noah Kaplan Quartet ===
Merega is a member of the Noah Kaplan Quartet. Their debut album Descendants was released by Hathut in 2011. It was followed by Cluster Swerve in 2017, and Out of the Hole in 2020. In its four-star review of the album, DownBeat magazine stated, "From track to track there is a consistent sense of rumination, where every intervallic brushstroke feels like the work of a painter meticulously applying and manipulating his medium to the canvas." K has recorded or performed with Joe Morris, Anthony Coleman, Mauro Pagani, Peter Erskine, Alan Pasqua, Rinde Eckert, Jason Nazary, Mike Pride, Tyshawn Sorey, Mat Maneri, and Joe Maneri.

=== Collaboration with Hampton Fancher ===
K began working with writer Hampton Fancher in 2010 when they collaborated on the spoken word cantata Rat Lunch. In 2016 they began collaborating on an opera, Salvation, for which Fancher wrote the story and libretto. The DVD of Michael Almereyda's documentary of Fancher, Escapes (2017), includes a video portrait of Fancher shot by K.

=== Other ===
K is the editor of the English edition of Ivan Wyschnegradsky's Manual of Quarter-Tone Harmony. He is a co-founder of Underwolf Records and works as a record producer for the label.

== Playing style ==
As a member of his quartet, he has played in a style influenced by the microtonal approach of Maneri. The New York City Jazz Record reviewer of their first album described his playing: "Kaplan's shifting pitches give his flowing lines, sliding across and between notes, even more vocal inflections than a regular hornman might impart, but he tends to be less speech-like in his phrasing and more likely to evoke animal similes in his flexible expressiveness, ranging from pained braying to exuberant crows." More generally, as an improviser, he "is devoted to quarter-tone improvisation and its integration into his music as a structural principle", wrote The New York City Jazz Record.

== Personal life ==
K is married to vocalist Rosie K.

== Discography ==
| Year | Title | Artist | Genre | Label | Ref |
|---|---|---|---|---|---|
| 2021 | Ignotum | Joe Morris and Noah K | Jazz | Glacial Erratic | |
| 2020 | Out Of The Hole | Noah Kaplan Quartet | Jazz | HatHut | |
| 2019 | Lalande | Dollshot | Dream pop | Underwolf | |
| 2017 | Cluster Swerve | Noah Kaplan Quartet | Jazz | HatHut | |
| 2014 | Crows and Motives | Noah Kaplan, Giacomo Merega, Joe Moffett | Jazz | Underwolf | |
| 2012 | Animal Culture | Joe Moffett, Noah Kaplan, Giacomo Merega, Jacob William, Luther Gray | Jazz | Not Two Records | |
| 2012 | Rat Lunch | Hampton Fancher & Noah K | Alternative | Underwolf | |
| 2012 | Watch the Walls Instead | Giacomo Merega, Marco Cappelli, Noah Kaplan with Anthony Coleman and Mauro Pagani | Jazz | Underwolf | |
| 2011 | Descendants | Noah Kaplan Quartet | Jazz | HatHut | |
| 2011 | Dollshot | Dollshot | Dream pop/indie pop | Underwolf | |
| 2008 | The Light and Other Things | Giacomo Merega, David Tronzo, Noah Kaplan | Jazz | Creative Nation Music | |

== Bibliography ==
- Wyschnegradsky, Ivan; Noah Kaplan (editor); Rosalie Kaplan (translator). Manual of Quarter-Tone Harmony. Underwolf Editions: New York 2017, ISBN 0692883746.
