= Delicate Steve =

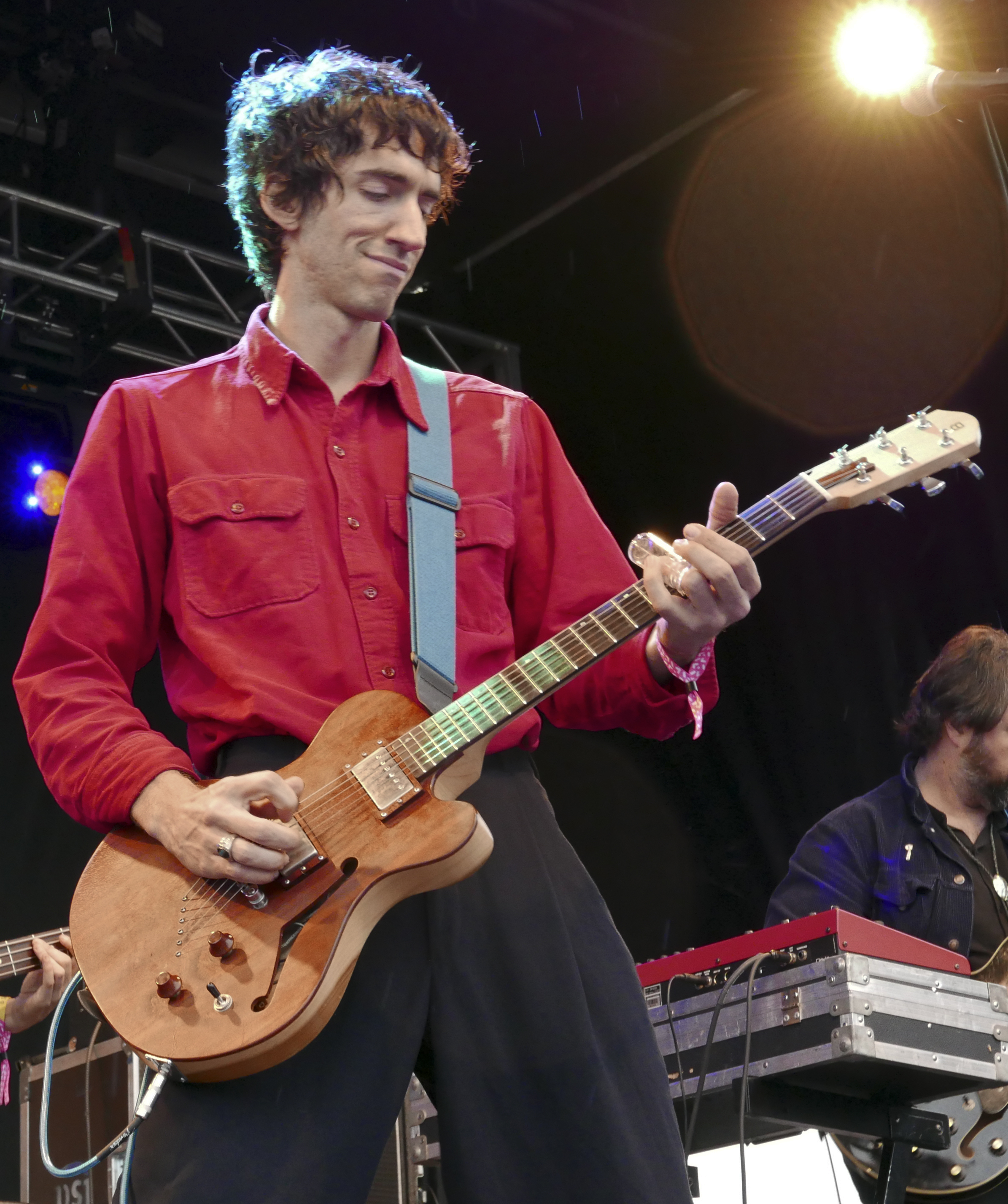
- Delicate Steve performing in 2017

Background information
- Born: Steve Marion
- Origin: Fredon Township, New Jersey, United States
- Years active: 2010–present
- Labels: Luaka Bop, Anti-
- Website: delicatesteve.com

Steve Marion, known professionally as Delicate Steve, is an American multi-instrumentalist who leads the band by the same name. Delicate Steve's sound has been described as hand-crafted with elements of progressive rock, folksy twang, African rhythms, surf rock and 1970s pop. Marion has collaborated with a wide range of artists in a variety of styles and genres, performing live and recording in-studio with artists such as The Black Keys, Paul Simon, Amen Dunes, Mac DeMarco, Tame Impala, Miley Cyrus, Martin Rev, Spike Jonze, and others.

== History ==
A resident of Fredon Township, New Jersey, he graduated from Pope John XXIII Regional High School in 2005; Warner Brothers had signed his band to a recording deal while he was still in high school.

After opening for Yeasayer at New York City's Governors Island in summer 2010 and a residency at Brooklyn club Union Pool, the band attracted media and record label attention. That year, Delicate Steve signed to Luaka Bop, who released the "Butterfly" single, backed with a cover of Fleetwood Mac's "Albatross" on the B-side.

=== Wondervisions (2011) ===
On January 25, 2011, Delicate Steve's debut album, Wondervisions, was released on Luaka Bop. The entirety of the album was recorded by Marion in his bedroom and quickly gained the attention of critics, becoming a "Critics' Choice" selection of The New York Times as well as being included on NPR's "Favorite Songs of 2011".

For the release of Wondervisions, author Chuck Klosterman wrote a fictional biography of Delicate Steve. The bio was originally published anonymously and was mostly taken as fact by fans and press, but was exposed in a feature news story on NPR's All Things Considered.

=== Positive Force (2012) ===
In July 2012, Delicate Steve's sophomore record, Positive Force, was released on Luaka Bop. The album quickly received high praise, including an 84 from Filter, an 8.5 from Paste, a 7.6 in Pitchfork and a 7 from Spin.

For promotion of Positive Force, a legitimate biography of the band was written by Michael Azerrad, author of Our Band Could Be Your Life.

On September 3, 2014, the band issued a free digital sampler EP, titled Multiple Moods Sampler, via Bandcamp.

=== Live in Las Vegas (2015) ===
Following the release of Positive Force, the band toured with Tame Impala, Mac DeMarco, Dirty Projectors, Tune-Yards and Yeasayer. While supporting Tame Impala on their US tour, a live album was recorded at a November 13, 2014 show at the Brooklyn Bowl in Las Vegas. Live in Las Vegas was released on March 3, 2015.

=== This Is Steve (2017) ===
In 2016, Delicate Steve signed to Anti- and toured with Cass McCombs. In January 2017, the band's third album, This Is Steve, was released on Anti-. The album was recorded entirely by Marion at Outlier Inn studios in Woodridge, NY in 11 days.

=== Till I Burn Up (2019) ===
In 2019, Delicate Steve released Till I Burn Up on Anti-. The album is marked by an exploration of experimental elements and guitar tones inspired in part by Kanye West’s vocals on My Beautiful Dark Twisted Fantasy, particularly the use of distorted and Auto-Tuned room mics. Later in 2019, West would go on to sample Wally Wilder, a track from Delicate Steve’s 2012 release, Positive Force.

=== Collaborations ===
As a guitarist, Marion has performed live on stage with Mac DeMarco, Kimbra, Built to Spill, Yeasayer, Dirty Projectors, Sonic Youth's Lee Ranaldo, Dr. Dog, Tune-Yards, Kyp Malone, Khaira Arby, Akron/Family, Ra Ra Riot, Fang Island, Sondre Lerche, Nicole Atkins and Seltzer Boys (a supergroup consisting of Yeasayer and Suckers members).

Marion also collaborated with Paul Simon on his 2015 album Stranger to Stranger.

In 2017, Marion joined the Growlers as a guitarist for their City Club world tour.

Marion collaborated with Amen Dunes to record guitar on the 2018 album Freedom. The record was met with positive critical acclaim, earning the title of “Best New Music” from Pitchfork. Uproxx critic Steven Hyden wrote, "With Marion’s understated but assertive guitar acting as the album's focal point, Freedom recalls the arena-ready, widescreen sweep of U2 or the Verve".

In 2019, Marion joined the Black Keys as a guitarist on their Let's Rock Tour.

=== Film Scoring & Visual Media ===
In 2022, Marion collaborated with animator and director Joe Cappa on the short film DELICATE STEVE – SCOOBY SNACK featuring the song "I Can Fly Away" from After Hours, which subsequently went viral on Instagram and TikTok.

In 2024, Marion worked with Cappa again on the music video for "I'll Be There" from Delicate Steve Sings, along with a series of promotional videos for the album release.

In 2025, Marion composed original music and licensed the Delicate Steve track "Friends" for Adult Swim's Haha, You Clowns.

In 2026, Marion composed the score to the Spike Jonze ad "The Shape of Dreams" starring Zendaya.

== Discography ==
=== Studio albums ===
- Wondervisions (2011, Luaka Bop)
- Positive Force (2012, Luaka Bop)
- This Is Steve (2017, Anti-)
- The Christmas Album (2018, Anti-)
- Till I Burn Up (2019, Anti-)
- After Hours (2022, Anti-)
- Delicate Steve Sings (2024, Anti-)
- Luke's Garage (2025, Have Fun Thinking)

=== EPs ===
- Cowboy Stories (2017, Anti-)
- Overnight Delivery (2026, Have Fun Thinking)

=== Singles ===
- "Butterfly" 7" (2011, Luaka Bop)
- "Many Moods" digital with Zach Hill (2011, self-released)
- "Valerie" 7" with Ra Ra Riot (2012, Barsuk Records)
- "Further Out" 7" with Callers (2012, Western Vinyl)
- "Brothers" with Tall Juan (2025, Have Fun Thinking)

=== Live albums ===
- Live in Las Vegas (2015, self-released)

=== Compilation EPs ===
- Multiple Moods Sampler digital EP (2014, self-released)

=== Compilation appearances ===
- "I'm Just Beginning to Live" (Jonathan Richman cover) on Panache Mixtape Series - Vol. 2 (2014)
- “Hallelujah - Live” (Leonard Cohen cover) on Sincerely, L. Cohen: A Live Celebration of Leonard Cohen (2017)

=== Guest appearances ===
- Yeasayer — Fragrant World (2012, Secretly Canadian)
- Saint Rich — Beyond the Drone (2013, Merge Records)
- Sondre Lerche — Please (2014, Mona)
- Anand Wilder — Break Line (2014, Secretly Canadian)
- People Get Ready — Physiques (2014, Brassland)
- Paul Simon — Stranger to Stranger (2015)
- Lewis Del Mar — Lewis Del Mar (2016, Columbia)
- Yeasayer — Amen & Goodbye (2016, Mute Records)
- Amen Dunes — Freedom (2018), Sacred Bones Records
- Miley Cyrus — Used To Be Young (2023, Columbia)
