= American Dust =

Independent American record label

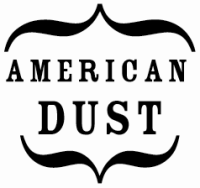
- Defunct: 2016
- Genre: Folk
- Location: Oakland, California

American Dust was an independent record label that operated out of Oakland, California. Notable artists to have released records on American Dust included Department of Eagles, Port O'Brien and Awesome Color.

In September 2009 the label released the Judee Sill tribute album Crayon Angel: A Tribute to the Music of Judee Sill, featuring covers of Sill's songs by Beth Orton, Bill Callahan, Ron Sexsmith, Daniel Rossen, Marissa Nadler and Meg Baird, among others.
