= Amen Dunes =

New York rock band formed in 2006

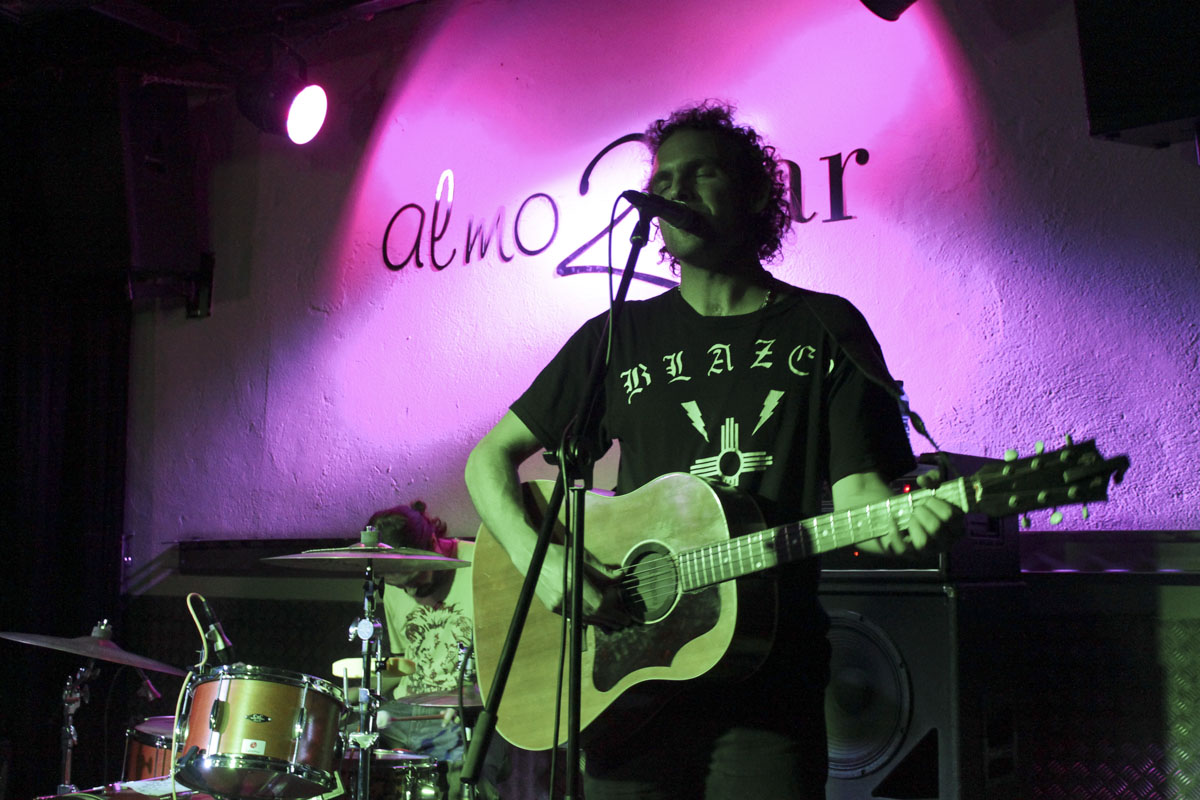
- Amen Dunes in 2014

Background information
- Origin: New York City, New York, U.S.
- Years active: 2006–2024
- Labels: Sub Pop; Sacred Bones; Locust Music; Perfect Lives; Atelier Ciseaux
- Members: Damon McMahon
- Website: www.amendunes.com

Amen Dunes was the musical project formed by American singer-songwriter and musician Damon McMahon in 2006.

== History ==
Damon McMahon founded the band Amen Dunes in 2006 in New York, New York.

Amen Dunes' fifth record, Freedom, has received positive reviews, with Pitchfork calling it McMahon's "euphoric breakthrough". In addition to his regular collaborators Parker Kindred and Jordi Wheeler, Freedom features Delicate Steve and underground Roman musician Panoram. Chris Coady (Beach House) produced. The record was recorded at Electric Lady Studios in New York City and Sunset Sound in Los Angeles.

On December 10, 2024, McMahon released Death Jokes II, a remix album, while simultaneously announcing the end of the Amen Dunes project.

This is the last chapter of the final volume. Goodbye, I’ve barely said a word to you, but it’s always like that at parties - we never really see each other, we never say the things we should like to; in fact it’s the same everywhere in this life. Let’s hope that when we are dead things will be better arranged.

== Discography ==
=== Studio albums ===
- 2009: D.I.A. (Locust)
- 2011: Through Donkey Jaw (Sacred Bones)
- 2013: Spoiler (Perfect Lives)
- 2014: Love (Sacred Bones)
- 2018: Freedom (Sacred Bones)
- 2024: Death Jokes (Sub Pop)

=== EPs ===
- 2010: Murder Dull Mind (Sacred Bones Records) – 12"
- 2011: Rat on a Grecian Urn (Fixed Identity) – Cassette
- 2012: Ethio Covers (self-released) – 7"
- 2015: Cowboy Worship (Sacred Bones Records) – 12"

=== Remix Albums ===
- 2024: Death Jokes II (Sub Pop)
