= Love (Amen Dunes album) =

Studio album by Amen Dunes
- Released: May 13, 2014
- Recorded: 2013 at The Pines (Griffintown, Montreal) Hotel2Tango (Mile End, Montreal) Strange Weather Studios (Brooklyn, New York) Trout Recording (Brooklyn, New York) The Bunker Studio (Brooklyn, New York)
- Genre: Indie rock · alternative country · folk · psychedelic folk
- Length: 48:55 (With Bonus Track- 52:19)
- Label: Sacred Bones

Amen Dunes chronology
Spoiler (2013)	Love (2014)	Cowboy Worship (2015)

Professional ratings
Aggregate scores
Source	Rating
Metacritic	81/100
Review scores
Source	Rating
AllMusic	4/5 stars
Consequence of Sound	B
Loud and Quiet	8/10
Morning Star	3/5 stars
musicOMH	4.5/5 stars
NME	8/10
Pitchfork	7.8/10
PopMatters	7/10
Tiny Mix Tapes	4.5/5 stars
Under the Radar	7/10

Love is a studio album by Amen Dunes.

== Track listing ==
All tracks are written by Amen Dunes.

No.	Title	Length
1.	"White Child"	5:15
2.	"Lonely Richard"	5:19
3.	"Splits Are Parted"	3:52
4.	"Sixteen"	2:56
5.	"Lilac in Hand"	3:28
6.	"Rocket Flare"	3:53
7.	"I Know Myself"	4:23
8.	"Everybody Is Crazy"	3:36
9.	"Green Eyes"	2:58
10.	"I Can't Dig It"	4:53
11.	"Love"	8:30

iTunes Bonus Track
No.	Title	Length
12.	"Sandy Channel"	3:24

== Chart positions ==
Chart (2014)	Peak position
Belgian Albums (Ultratop Flanders)	187

== Release history ==
Country	Date	Format (Version)	Label
Worldwide	May 13, 2014	CD, Vinyl, Digital download	Sacred Bones Records
