= Say Hey Records =

Say Hey Records was an independent record label based in New York City active from 2003 to 2008, and was the brainchild of founder Aaron Romanello. The label has put out notable records by White Rabbits, Shy Child, Miles Benjamin Anthony Robinson's eponymous debut LP, and Inouk, as well as releases by Cause For Applause, The Boggs, Tomorrow's Friend, The Occasion, and Kiila.
