= Noah Kalina =

American photographer

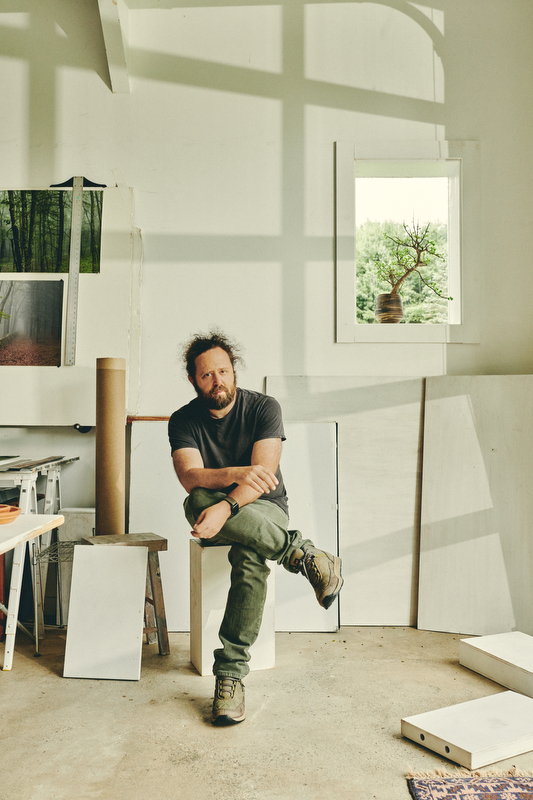
- Kalina in his studio in 2021
- Born: Noah Kalina; July 4, 1980 (age 46); Huntington, NY, U.S.
- Education: School of Visual Arts
- Known for: Landscape photography; Portrait photography
- Notable work: Everyday
- Website: noahkalina.com

Noah Kalina (born July 4, 1980) is an American art photographer. Much of Kalina's work focuses on the passage of time including his well-known project Everyday which shows the aging of a human. His photographs have appeared in The New York Times Magazine, Monocle, Businessweek, Nylon, Esquire, Le Monde, and Interview, among others.

== Life ==
Born in Huntington, New York, on July 4, 1980, Kalina attended Harborfields High School. He graduated from the School of Visual Arts. For years he was based in Williamsburg, Brooklyn but Kalina now works from a studio in Lumberland, New York. Kalina has created a number of widely exhibited photographs, generally working in medium format, using the Danish Phase One XF camera+IQ3 back with Schneider and Phase One lenses and Profoto strobes.

== Diachronic Photography ==
A number of Kalina's projects have been noted as examinations of the passage of time. By returning to a subject at a later point and creating additional photographs of it, a sequence of his images draws attention both to the aspects of the subject that have changed and the aspects that have remained the same. Projects that use this format include Everyday (himself, since 2000), Domino Sugar (the Domino Sugar Factory, since 2010), River and N1 (the intersection of River Street and North 1st Street in Brooklyn, since 2013), Lumberland (a black walnut tree, since 2015), and The River (the Delaware River, since 2015). In 2020, The New York Times commissioned a new extended series of photos-over-time from Kalina of the view from his bedroom window from October 2020 to June 2021.

=== Everyday ===
[Everyday] represents a phenomenal amplification [in] how many people the piece touched in such a short period of time. There is nothing comparable in the history of photography.

— William A. Ewing, museum director of the Musée de l'Élysée, speaking to The New York Times

Kalina began taking a photo of himself every day starting on January 10, 2000, at age 19. The video Everyday shows the photos chronologically, six per second, with an original piano score by his former girlfriend Carly Comando. Kalina uploaded the video in August 2006 where it received widespread attention and has since become the subject of homages and parodies. The long-term project is ongoing. Since 2008, Kalina has been using the Nikon Coolpix S10 to make his daily portrait.

== Other notable photographs ==
Kalina's style of photography has been described as "meditative" and "quiet".

- In May 2012, Kalina created the official wedding portrait of Mark Zuckerberg and Priscilla Chan in their backyard in Palo Alto, California.
- In 2012, Disney selected Kalina to produce a series of photographs of their characters in their parks called "The Looking Glass".
- In 2013, conglomerate General Electric commissioned Kalina to produce photographs in their newly opened $50 million jet engine testing site to document aviation developments.
- In 2016, tech-giant Google sent Kalina to document through photography their data centers around the world.
- In 2019, after major renovations, the Museum of Modern Art commissioned a series of photographs to highlight their reopening campaign "the New MoMA".

== Additional projects ==
In July 2019, Kalina began to publish a popular email newsletter covering topics including photography and nature and Kalina has commented this project is his primary focus. In October 2020, Kalina and commercial director Adam Lisagor launched the podcast All Consuming where they review direct-to-consumer brands that advertise on Instagram.

== Exhibitions ==
Year	Title	Gallery	Location
2025	Greetings from Here	Sullivan Public	Eldred, NY
2024	Protect the Network	The Field Room	Callicoon, NY
2024	Discovering Water	Galli-Curci Theatre	Margaretville, NY
2024	A River Valley Landscape	The Darby	Beach Lake, PA
2024	Process Projected	WIHH Gallery	Amsterdam, Netherlands
2022	The Wood for the Trees	Hawk & Hive	Andes, NY
2021	Over Time	Catskill Art Society	Livingston Manor, NY
2021	The River	Nonneta and Friends Creative	Barryville, NY
2021	XII Edition	Magmart	Naples, Italy
2020	Village Motel	Gallerie Blanc	Montreal, Canada
2020	everyday	VSOP Projects	Greenport, NY
2019	This Must Be The Place	VSOP Projects	Greenport, NY
2018	Cosmik Debris	VSOP Projects	Greenport, NY
2018	Decode: Artist Interpret Data	John Jay College of Criminal Justice	New York, NY
2018	The Great Outdoors	Hurleyville Arts Centre	Hurleyville, NY
2017	Landscapes and Interventions	Hathaway Gallery	Atlanta, GA
2017	Projected	International Center of Photography	New York, NY
2017	Daydreams and Nightmares	VSOP Projects	Greenport, NY
2017	The Fog	Catskill Art Society	Livingston Manor, NY
2015	In the Mood: Photography and the Everyday	Irene Carlson Gallery of Photography	La Verne, CA
2015	Selfie: From Self Portrait to Staging the Self	Brandts Museum of Photographic Art	Odense, Denmark
2015	Tomorrow Has Passed	One-Eyed Jacks Gallery	Brighton, UK
2014	Performance: Contemporary Photography from the Douglas Nielsen Collection	Center for Creative Photography	Tucson, AZ
2013	Flowers	17 Frost	Brooklyn, NY
2013	Lovin' it?	Bromer Art Collection	Roggwil, Switzerland
2013	These Friends 4	THIS LA	Los Angeles, CA
2012	Myths and Realities	Visual Arts Gallery	New York, NY
2012	Faces, Places and Spaces	Arvada Center for the Arts and Humanities	Arvada, CO
2012	Biennale of Social Design	Utrecht Manifest	Utrecht, Netherlands
2011	Borders	THIS LA	Los Angeles, CA
2011	As Time Goes By	Triennale di Milano	Milan, Italy
2011	And Introducing…	Worksound Gallery	Portland, OR
2011	ilmage: The Uncommon Portrait	Portsmouth Museum of Art	Portsmouth, NH
2010	Night Gallery	Corcoran School of the Arts and Design	Washington, DC
2010	Playground	Octane	Atlanta, GA
2010	Thanks for Sharing	D21 Kunstraum	Leipzig, Germany
2010	Cercle Vicieux	Espace 201	Montreal, Canada
2010	Pro'jekt LA 3: Dear Diary	MOPLA - Space 15 Twenty	Los Angeles, CA
2010	these friends	THIS LA	Los Angeles, CA

== Bibliography ==
- Kalina, Noah (2020). Lamb, Richy (ed.). Tiny Flock. Glasgow, Scotland: Post Post Modern.
- Kalina, Noah (2019). Bedmounds. Yoffy Press. ISBN 978-1949608137.
- Klein, Zach; Kalina, Noah (2015). Cabin Porn. Little, Brown and Company. ISBN 978-0316378215.
- Kalina, Noah (2014). PRIMED. CreateSpace Independent Publishing Platform. ISBN 978-1503269231.
