= Isaiah Saxon =

American film and music video director (born 1983)

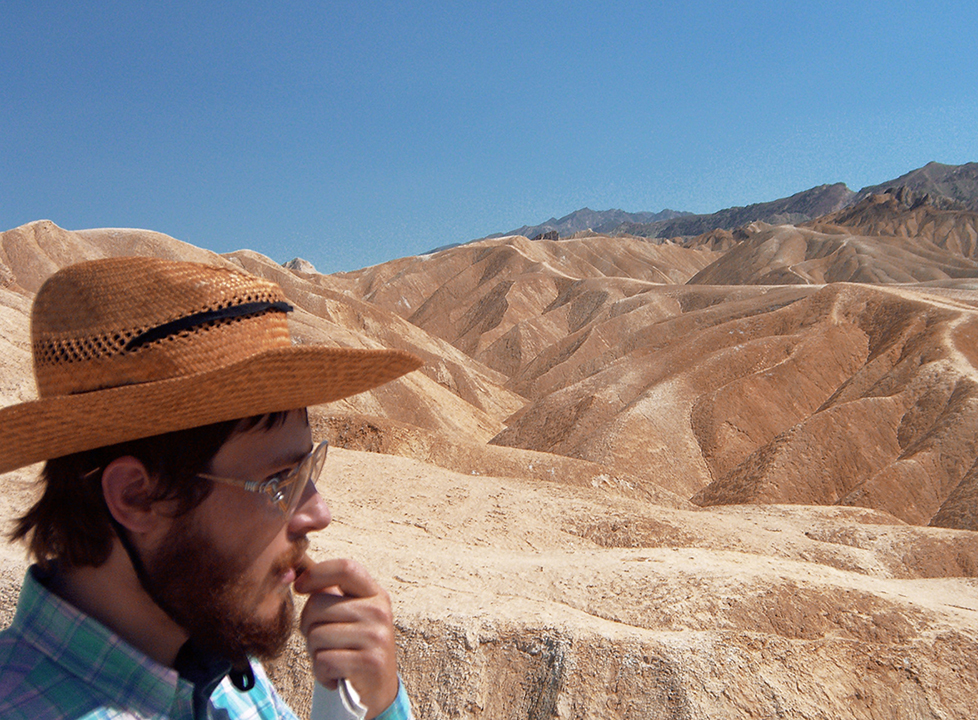
- Saxon in 2006
- Born: 1983 (age 42–43); Aptos, California, U.S.
- Education: Academy of Art University
- Occupations: Film director Co-founder, Encyclopedia Pictura; Co-founder, DIY.org
- Years active: 2003–present
- Website: isaiahsaxon.com

Isaiah Saxon (born 1983) is an American film and music video director. He co-founded the animation studio Encyclopedia Pictura, and the online community DIY.org.

== Early life and education ==
Saxon was born and raised in Aptos, California. He majored in film directing at the Academy of Art University in San Francisco.

== Career ==
=== Encyclopedia Pictura ===
Saxon and Sean Hellfritsch founded Encyclopedia Pictura as a directing duo in 2004, before expanding into a trio when Daren Rabinovitch joined in 2007, and ultimately transforming into an animation studio. Through Encyclopedia Pictura, Saxon has directed music videos, short films and commercials. The studio is known for creating ambitious music videos and short films with an organic, handmade quality.

In 2007, Saxon and Hellfritsch directed the music video for the Grizzly Bear single "Knife". The video was filmed in Death Valley, CA and Brooklyn, NY. Their first major video, it was listed at #26 on Pitchfork's list of the top 50 music videos of the 2000s.

Following the "Knife" video, Saxon got a call from Björk, asking Encyclopedia Pictura to direct a music video for her single "Wanderlust". Their concept was inspired by the work of Hayao Miyazaki, Stanley Kubrick, and Walt Disney's work from the 1930s. The video was shot at Matthew Barney's studio in New York City, in stereoscopic 3-D using a 3-D camera rig they designed and built. Combining handmade puppetry, scale modeling, CGI and live action, it took over nine months to complete. The "Wanderlust" video premiered at the Deitch Projects gallery in Long Island City, Queens, and was shown in 3-D at Saatchi & Saatchi's 2008 New Directors Showcase. It won three D&AD Yellow Pencil awards and the UK Music Video Award for Video of the Year. Spin magazine named it the best music video of 2008, and Pitchfork ranked it #21 on its list of the top 50 music videos of the 2000s.

Saxon directed the animated music video for the Panda Bear song "Boys Latin", which premiered on Adult Swim in 2015. It was nominated for the UK Music Video Award for Best Animation in a Video.

=== DIY.org ===
In 2011, Saxon began developing a feature film titled DIY, about a group of kids that rebuild their town after a flood. The following year, Saxon, Zach Klein, Andrew Sliwinski and Daren Rabinovitch founded DIY.org, an online educational community for kids, with a storefront in San Francisco. Saxon served as chief creative officer from the company's founding in 2012 through 2014. He creates the skill patches that are sent out to community members.

=== Trout Gulch ===
Starting in 2008, Saxon, Hellfritsch and Rabinovitch transformed 10 acres in the wooded hills in Aptos, California, into Trout Gulch, a community where they built their own houses, farmed, and produced digital animation. The intent was to blend technology with nature. At its peak, 18 people lived at Trout Gulch.

== Honors and awards ==
- Named one of 25 New Faces of Independent Film by Filmmaker magazine, 2008
- D&AD Yellow Pencil for Best Music Video, Music Video Art Direction and Music Video Special Effects ("Wanderlust"), 2009
- Named one of 25 "Best and Brightest" by Esquire magazine, 2009
- UK Music Video Awards Video of the Year (for "Wanderlust"), 2008
- #1 on Spin magazine's 20 Best Music Videos of 2008 (for "Wanderlust")
- #21, Pitchfork's Top 50 Music Videos of the 2000s (for "Wanderlust")
- #26, Pitchfork's Top 50 Music Videos of the 2000s (for "Knife")
- Nominee, UK Music Video Awards Best Animation in a Video (for "Boys Latin"), 2015

== Filmography ==
Feature film

- The Legend of Ochi (2025)

Short film

Year	Title	Notes
2005	Grow	
2005	Micro/Macro	
2008	How Will You Create the Universe?	Trailer for Spore video game
2010	The Internet	Soundtrack by Dan Deacon
2013	Jay Nelson: Fort Builder	
2016	The Tale of Hillbelly	

Music video

Year	Title	Artist
2005	"Soo Tall"	Zion I
2006	"Haven't Been Yourself"	Seventeen Evergreen
2007	"Knife"	Grizzly Bear
2008	"Wanderlust"	Björk
2015	"Boys Latin"	Panda Bear
