= Kai Lossgott =

- Born: 1980 (age 45–46); Marktoberdorf, Germany
- Occupation: Interdisciplinary artist
- Years active: 2003-present
- Notable work: small and common matters (2015), hunter-gatherer (2016), nothing with skin is blind (2008-2010), secure (2003-2005)
- Website: https://kailossgott.net/

Kai Lossgott is a South African interdisciplinary artist whose object, body, and lens-based practice encompasses the fields of performance, photography, writing, drawing, and film.

== Background and education ==
Lossgott was born in Marktoberdorf, Germany. He holds a BJOURN in journalism and media studies from Rhodes University, with undergraduate studies in theatre (1999-2002). He received an advanced diploma in visual arts from the University of South Africa in 2004 and completed a master's degree in creative writing at the University of Cape Town in 2008. All degrees were awarded cum laude.

=== Public exhibitions ===
Lossgott's works have been exhibited in institutions across South Africa, such as the Johannesburg Art Gallery and Museum Africa, as well as in private galleries. Internationally, his work has been shown at the Biennale of Dakar, Arnot Museum (New York), Whitechapel Gallery (London) and the Centre Georges Pompidou (Paris).

=== Awards and nominations ===
- Winner of l’Atelier Art Award, small and common matters. Video installation. 2015 Absa Barclay’s l’Atelier Art Competition.
- Magmart Festival Award, read these roads. Video. 2011 Fondazione Forum Universal della Cultura, Naples.
- Nomination, unsaid. Performance collaboration with Anthea Moys. 2007. Spier Contemporary.
- Nomination, armed and ready. Video installation. 2004 Brett Kebble Art Awards

=== Artist publications ===
- The Eternal Life Suit: notes towards an outfit for posterity, v x.y hunter-gatherer. Artist book box set, two-tone risograph on hand-stitched newsprint, postconsumer waste box (2018).
- hunter-gatherer. ABSA l’Atelier Award solo exhibition catalogue (2017).
- not in my back yard: locating the anthropocene. Artist book box set with postconsumer waste pages. (2016).
- talking to the tree outside my window when I sleep. Based on the artist book of the same name, laser-engraved plant leaves and pergamano paper on lightbox (2010).
- the thrill: poems and pictures (2007/2015).
- alpha. Altered address book and experimental film on DVD (2007).

=== Academic publications ===
- Johannesburg, profile of an Emerging Art Centre, “Art & the Global Economy”.
- read these roads: On the denial of non-anthropocentric subjectivity in urban spaces (2013).
- Trust and Telepresence (2012).
- You are the interface: Collaboration, Intervention and Participation in 21st Century Media Ecologies (2012).

== Previous work ==
Lossgott’s previous work questions (self) definitions of 21st century human beings within the planetary ecology and Anthropocene, through collecting and experimenting with ephemeral found objects.

=== hunter-gatherer (2016) ===
hunter-gatherer asks what it means to be human in an era of anthropogenic ecological crisis. The work re-evaluates and contextualises material value invested in postconsumer objects, found between open streets and the confines of institutions. Hunter-gatherer was performed in Berlin, Zagreb, Dakar and Paris, most notably in the Centre Georges Pompidou.

=== small and common matters (2015) ===
Through stop-motion and time-lapse macro photography, coupled with a soundtrack remixing lectures on floral dissection, the artist’s voice reflects in small and common matters on consciously perceiving tiny things otherwise taken for granted. This becomes an extended reflection on anthropocentric taxonomy and utility. The video projection/installation has featured found dust and waste, and found and discarded botanical specimens, arranged as a shadow to below the projection beam.

=== secret powers (2011) ===
The installation secret powers features 20 pre-owned dress shoes arranged in an evenly spaced 5x4 grid. One expensive pair stands out from the rest, glowing with an LED-generated illumination, plugged into the wall, and attached to a power meter. Secret Powers is inspired by the 2011 Occupy Movement and highlights how choosing to be “unplugged” as a conscious lifestyle decision might help conserve dwindling natural resources, but also represents victims of climate justice.

=== nothing with skin is blind (2008-2010) ===
In nothing with skin is blind, the artist focuses on the materiality of the plant leaf as ‘body’, engraving experimental texts in the tradition of 19th-century romantic love poetry on the leaves by hand, typewriter, and laser, then displaying them like botanical specimens in light boxes. These gleaming images and texts are published in the artist’s monograph ‘talking to the tree outside my window while I sleep’.

=== secure (2003-2005) ===
In the solo exhibition secure, Lossgott creates a dialogue around white suburban identity in South Africa in the form of photographs, sketches, video installations, texts, and an experimental website.

=== Filmography ===
- approximate particulars. 2017. 04’ 31’’. DV PAL HD. Video installation.
- small and common matters. 2014. 03’ 13’’. DV PAL HD. Video installation.
- read these roads. 2010. 03’ 59’’. DV PAL SD. Video installation.
- walking in plastic. 2009. 07’09’’. DV PAL SD. With Mduduzi Nyembe and Bandile Gumbi.
- diving. 2009. 02’24’’. DV PAL SD.
- origins I, genesis. 2008. 03’09’’. DV PAL SD. Performed by the artist.
- origins II, noesis. 2011. 03’ 28’. DV PAL SD. Performed by Nadja Lossgott.
- origins III, pangenesis. 2011. DV PAL SD. Performed by Kurt Lossgott and Celia De Villiers.
- alpha. 2007. 03’19’’. DV PAL SD.
- armed and ready. 2004. 02’ 25’’. DV PAL SD.
- secret language of the bourgeoisie. 2004. 01’54’’. Digital Animation for surveillance camera monitor. DV PAL SD.
- after purity. 2003. 03’ 25’’. DV PAL SD.

== Curatorial and collaborative projects ==
Lossgott has pursued curatorial projects in motion image, reflecting his interests in interdisciplinary, intermodality, urban and environmental issues.

=== Letters from the Sky (2012) ===
Focusing on the effects of climate change, Letters from the Sky was screened aboard the Climate Train and in delegates’ hotel lobbies during the COP17 Climate Change Conference (Durban, South Africa) and around other venues across the country. Lossgott gathered 40 artists’ submissions from over 16 countries. These films were a response to Lossgott’s initial concern about how climate change has not only affected the world as a whole but the lives of every individual going about their daily routine. It was also screened during COP21 in Paris.

=== City Breath (2010) ===
Twenty short films created by artists were screened in four South African cities (Cape Town, Durban, Grahamstown, Johannesburg) and in international venues such as The British Film Institute in London, as well as in Kharkov, Vancouver, Marseilles, Edinburgh, and Berlin.

== Recent work ==
Project Carbon is a multidisciplinary long-term research project that focuses on topics such as rebirth, cities, and consumption. In this project, the artist uses a multiple-chaptered time-lapse film to present the findings of his speculative research to the public.
