= Cabin Porn =

Cabin Porn may refer to:

- Cabin Porn (book), a 2015 photo-book by Zach Klein
- Cabin Porn, a song by Momus from the 2016 album Scobberlotchers
