= The Legend of Ochi =

2025 film by Isaiah Saxon

- Theatrical release poster
- Directed by: Isaiah Saxon
- Written by: Isaiah Saxon
- Produced by: Richard Peete; Traci Carlson; Isaiah Saxon; Jonathan Wang
- Starring: Helena Zengel; Finn Wolfhard; Emily Watson; Willem Dafoe
- Cinematography: Evan Prosofsky
- Edited by: Paul Rogers
- Music by: David Longstreth
- Production companies: AGBO; Neighborhood Watch; Encyclopedia Pictura; Year of the Rat
- Distributed by: A24
- Release dates: January 26, 2025 (Sundance); April 18, 2025 (United States)
- Running time: 95 minutes
- Country: United States
- Language: English
- Budget: $10 million
- Box office: $4.9 million

The Legend of Ochi (/ˈoʊtʃi/) is a 2025 American fantasy adventure film written and directed by Isaiah Saxon in his feature film debut and starring Helena Zengel, Finn Wolfhard, Emily Watson, and Willem Dafoe. It tells the story of a farm girl on a fictional Black Sea island who discovers a wounded baby primate-like creature and works to return it to its family while learning their language and avoiding a hunting party led by her father and her adopted brother.

It was released in the United States by A24 in limited theaters on April 18, 2025 before a wide release on April 25. The film was met with positive reviews.

== Plot ==
On the Black Sea island of Carpathia, inhabitants have hunted primate-like creatures known as the Ochi (Ukrainian: очі lit. 'eyes') for generations. A fanatical villager named Maxim leads a hunting party of young boys, forcing his daughter Yuri and adopted son Petro to join them, and gives the reluctant Yuri a knife passed down from his own father. Blaming the Ochi for driving away Yuri's mother, Maxim leads the children to believe the creatures are dangerous monsters.

During a hunt, a baby Ochi is separated from its mother, and Yuri finds it caught in a trap. She secretly brings it home and tends to its injured leg, discovering it to be a sapient creature when it treats her pet caterpillar kindly. Determined to return the baby to its family, she runs away from home, while a conflicted Petro fails to stop her. Finding a farewell note Yuri left behind with her grandfather's knife, Maxim discovers traces of the baby and claims she has been abducted by the Ochi, rallying his young hunters to find her.

Yuri visits a supermarket but the baby Ochi is discovered, and she steals a car after the frightened baby bites her in the commotion, poisoning her arm. Taking refuge near a pond, a weakening Yuri discovers she can speak the Ochi's song-like language, before falling into a caged hole. She is rescued by her estranged mother Dasha, who treats her with blood from brown bats, which have developed an immunity to Ochi venom. Yuri believes the venom has allowed her to understand the Ochi's language, but her mother explains that she taught it to her as a baby, having studied the language and its similarity to music. Dasha warns that the Ochi will never befriend humans and may reject the baby, and Yuri angrily sets off alone.

Tracking Yuri to Dasha's cabin, Petro summons Maxim and the boys. Dasha rebukes Maxim for his militant ways, having left the family after she was bitten by an Ochi herself and he cut off her hand to save her. She reveals Yuri has gone, but Petro and the others find her map of the Ochi's territory. In the wilderness, Yuri reunites with the baby Ochi, which speaks about missing its family and tries to comfort Yuri, who claims not to not miss her own parents.

Traveling by river, they arrive at the Ochi's mountain caves with the hunters in pursuit, and Petro finally stands up to his father for driving their family away. Unwilling to endanger the others, Maxim removes his ceremonial armor to swim into the caves alone. He is trapped by fallen timber and Yuri turns back to help, stunning her father by speaking the Ochi's language. She apologizes for rejecting her grandfather's knife, but Maxim admits he actually bought it at a gas station to impress her. He shares a tender moment with the baby Ochi, and Yuri manages to free him.

They reach the Ochi's home at the center of the mountain, while the hunters take aim from above, and one of the boys fires a shot before Petro disarms him. An injured Maxim rushes to intervene, but the angered Ochi are calmed by flute music from Dasha, who has discovered cave paintings of ancient humans playing flutes to communicate with the Ochi. Using their language, Yuri peacefully returns the baby to its mother. Maxim and Petro look on as Yuri and Dasha embrace, and the Ochi raise their voices in celebration.

== Cast ==
The cast list is sorted into the different categories during the end credits.

The Family:

- Helena Zengel as Yuri, a farm girl who found the baby Ochi
- Willem Dafoe as Maxim, a farmer/hunter and the father of Yuri who hunts the Ochi
- Emily Watson as Dasha, the estranged mother of Yuri who knows the Ochi language and sports a prosthetic left hand due to an incident that Maxim caused regarding an Ochi bite
- Finn Wolfhard as Petro, the older adopted brother of Yuri

The Boys:

- Răzvan Stoica as Ivan, a member of Maxim's hunting party whose father owned a timber camp
- Carol Bors as Oleg, a member of Maxim's hunting party whose Uncle Belka won't go out with his herd and stays inside drinking
- Andrei Antoniu Anghel as Vlad, a member of Maxim's hunting party
- David Andrei Baltatu as Gleb, a member of Maxim's hunting party whose farm is missing its five geese and three cats
- Eduard Mihail Oancea as Pavel, a member of Maxim's hunting party whose father's best stud was "bled dry" by the Ochi
- Tomas Otto Ghela as Tudor, a member of Maxim's hunting party

The Ochi:

- Paul Manalatos as the Ochi vocal effects
- Robert Tygner as Lead Ochi Puppeteer
- Caroline Bowman, Lynn Robertson Bruce, Iestyn Evans, and Susan Beattie as Ochi Puppeteers
- Zoe Midgley as Mother Ochi
- Alexandra Dușa, Ana Maria Cucută, Alexandru Condurat, and Anna L. Coats as the vocal effects of the Adult Ochis

The Carpathians:

- Ștefan Burlacu as Victor
- Emanuel Stoicescu as Richard
- Ioana Ștefan as Mommy Shopper #1
- Meara O'Reilly as Mommy Shopper #2
- Andreea Mustață as Lady Cop
- Gabriel Spahiu as Dude Cop
- Puiu-Mircea Lăscuș as Drunk Man
- Victoria Dicu as Ivan's Mother

== Production ==
On November 10, 2021, it was reported that Isaiah Saxon would write and direct The Legend of Ochi, a fantasy adventure film based on his own original story, and will star Willem Dafoe, Emily Watson, Finn Wolfhard, and Helena Zengel, with A24 fully financing and serving as worldwide distributor.

Some scenes of the film were shot in Transylvania, in the Apuseni Mountains, at the Bâlea Lake and on the Transfăgărășan road. Principal photography started in Romania on November 1, 2021, and continued at the Castel Film Studios until December 15, 2021. The film makes use of puppetry, animatronics, computer animation and matte paintings. The titular creature was a puppet by Encyclopedia Pictura, operated by 7 performers. The film had a budget of $10 million.

== Release ==
The Legend of Ochi premiered at the Sundance Film Festival on January 26, 2025. It had a wide theatrical release in the United States on April 25, 2025, following a limited release in New York City and Los Angeles on April 18. It was previously scheduled to be released on February 28, 2025, but it was delayed in January 2025 after Saxon lost his home in the Southern California wildfires.

== Reception ==
=== Box office ===
In the United States and Canada, The Legend of Ochi was released alongside Until Dawn, The Accountant 2, and the re-release of Star Wars: Episode III – Revenge of the Sith, and was projected to gross around $5 million from 1,150 theaters in its opening weekend.

=== Critical response ===
On the review aggregator website Rotten Tomatoes, 75% of 138 critics' reviews are positive, with an average rating of 6.5/10. The website's consensus reads: "A marvel of state-of-the-art puppetry and visual effects, The Legend of Ochi elevates its predictable story with enchanting presentation." Metacritic, which uses a weighted average, assigned the film a score of 67 out of 100, based on 28 critics, indicating "generally favorable" reviews.

Brian Tallerico of RogerEbert.com gave the film three out of four stars and wrote, "The Legend of Ochi, the rare A24 family film, is a charming throwback to adventure movies of the '80s like The Neverending Story and The Dark Crystal, complete with original puppetry that reportedly contains not an ounce of CGI manipulation". Carlos Aguilar of Variety commented: "With unique enough lore and a unique style, Saxon avoids making a derivate fable. Ochi prompts one to think, 'How did they do that?' only to be even more incredulous when realizing the techniques employed. That's film sorcery". Jesse Harsenger of The Guardian said, "This should be a deeply touching moment of intergenerational, cross-species understanding. Yet it's treated more as a technical triumph than a truly emotional one, and that's true of the film as a whole. The soul of the movie isn't particularly in the human/creature relationship at its center, but in the stunning craftsmanship that surrounds (and in the creature's case, creates) them. If that makes the movie less of a high-water mark than a masterpiece like ET, it's also an anomaly in a world where US children's films are so intent on prodding and goading their audiences into predetermined reactions. Sometimes genuine awe is enough."

Justin Lowe of The Hollywood Reporter wrote "It's evident that The Legend of Ochi's production values far exceed what might be expected from a reported $10 million budget, and demonstrate that Saxon can deliver a fully realized vision of a highly original concept. Now it's up to audiences to determine whether it's a classic." Alissa Wilkinson of The New York Times described it as "an elaborately designed and very effective nostalgia piece for the movies of that time". David Ehrlich of IndieWire wrote "For a story that takes place in such a tactile and cohesive fantasy world, it's frustrating that the archness of its telling keeps the viewer at a distance rather than pulling them closer to the heart of the matter. As a result, the stakes at play rarely feel worthy of the same imagination that makes them so clear, and the movie goes slack in a way it can never fully recover from when it slows down to explain itself during the second act." Bilge Ebiri of Vulture wrote "The Legend of Ochi looks amazingly, impressively real, but it's populated by non-characters pursuing a nothing story."

Isaac Feldberg of Little White Lies wrote "Saxon's film harkens back to Amblin classics like E.T.: The Extra Terrestrial and Gremlins, where coming-of-age fantasy collided with family drama, the emotive frisson between them fueled by a sense of danger and possibility and embodied by peculiar visitors from another place. The former's defining image, a boy and his alien friend riding a bicycle into the midnight sky, enchanted an entire generation; certain sights and sounds here similarly fire the imagination, even if they're shrouded in a story that more often functions in thrall to its influences than as anything near an original artifact." A. A. Dowd of Empire wrote "The first feature from music-video director Isaiah Saxon boasts wondrous old-school creature effects, but they've been applied to a rather derivative fable, an eccentric but skimpy Amblin wannabe."

=== Accolades ===
Award / Festival	Date of ceremony	Category	Recipient(s)	Result	Ref.
Sitges Film Festival	19 October 2025	Best Feature Film	The Legend of Ochi	Nominated	
