= Shahar Marcus =

Israeli artist (born 1971)

Shahar Marcus שחר מרקוס
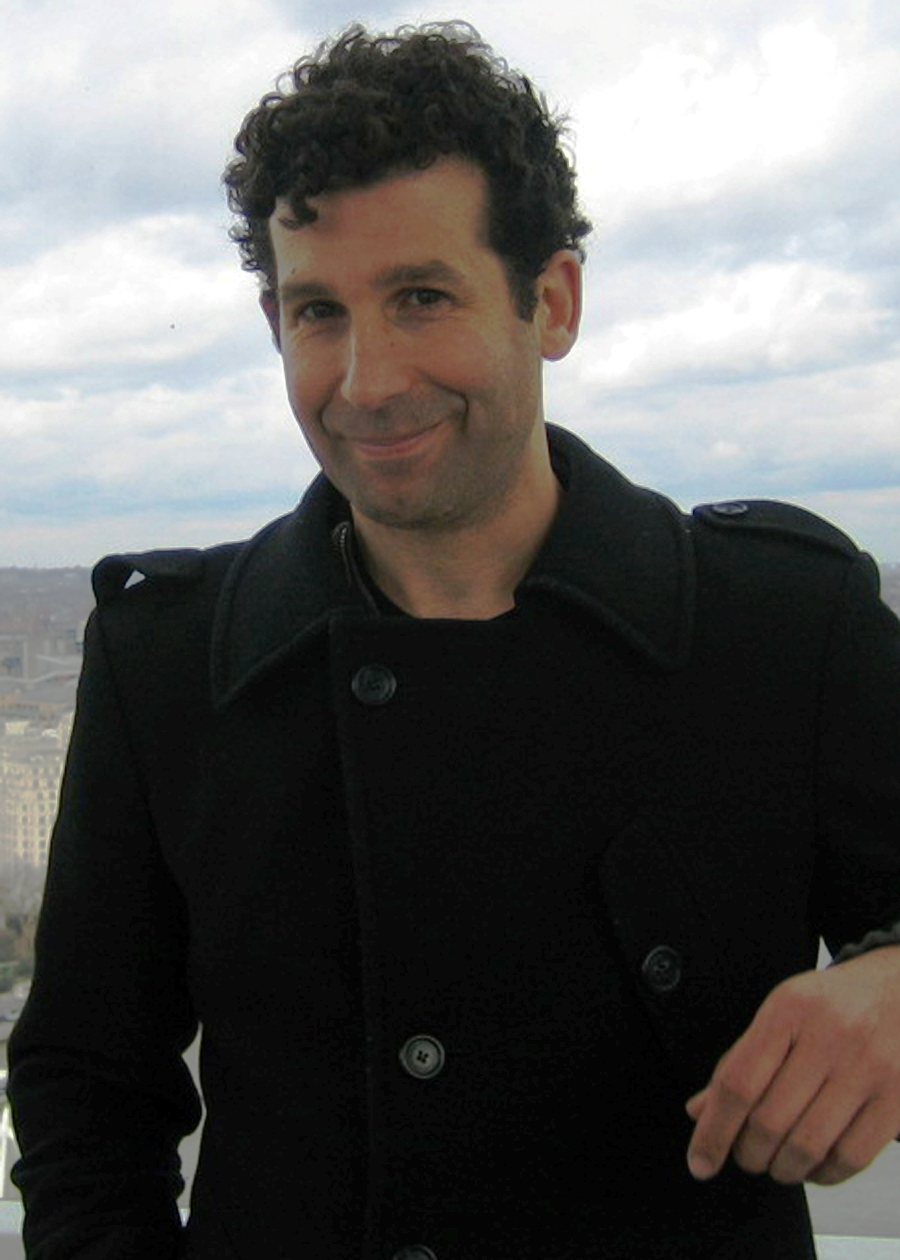
- Born: 1971 (age 54–55); Petah Tikva, Israel
- Education: Tel Aviv University
- Known for: Video art, performance and installations

Shahar Marcus (Hebrew: שחר מרקוס; born 1971) is an Israeli artist who works primarily in video, performance and installations.

== Biography ==
Shahar Marcus was born in 1971 at Petah Tikva. His mother was a teacher and father a Diamond dealer. His first child was born during 2011 and in 2014 his youngest daughter joined the family. They currently reside in Tel Aviv, Israel.

In his early works Marcus dealt with the exploration of his own body and its limitations; his body serving as an instrument or rather a platform for the conducting of experiments with various perishable materials, such as dough, juice, ice and fire. While his early video-performances feature himself along with other artists, with whom he had collaborated in the past, in his recent works, Marcus appears by himself, while embodying different roles and characters.

His most recent works he deal with local political issues, by approaching iconic Israeli landmarks with a critical and humorous point of view (like "1,2,3,Herring"). Thus, Marcus reflects on his own heritage, environment and the creation of local historical narratives. He aspires to tackle a local issue, and convey it through universal visual means ("The Curator", "King of Falafel", "Homecoming Artist and Leap of Faith").

As of 2012, Marcus has been collaborating with the Turkish-German performance artist Nezaket Ekici. The both of them have been employing their own bodies as a medium to build up forces and energies, to resolve tensions and conflicts. By pushing their own physical limits, they cause their works to revolve in no small measure around the limits of cultural and political difference. (Methexis, Sand Clock, Salt Dinner).

== Education ==
- 1993‐1997 BA Linguistics, University of Tel Aviv
- 1999‐2004 MA History of Art, University of Tel Aviv

== Awards and residencies ==
- 2015 The Discovery award, Loop art fair and festival, Barcelona, Spain.
- 2013 The Israeli Ministry of Culture award for Encouraging Creativity.
- 2013 Special mention for "seeds" at the 20 min\max film festival, Ingolstadt, Germany.
- 2012 Winner of the "press" award, Laguna art prize, Venice, Italy
- 2011 Winner of the celeste prize-video award
- 2011 ArtMuse video festival, first place for "Freeze", Bocholt, Germany
- 2010 Art OMI, New York City
- 2009 Special mention for "frog test" video art. The Jerusalem International Film festival, Israel.
  - Jerusalem Film Festival, Experimental Cinema Award
  - Naoussa Film Festival People's Choice Award
- 2008 Beatrice Kolliner award for young artist, Israel Museum of Art
- 2006 Young Artist Award, Ministry of Education And Culture

== Solo exhibitions ==
- 2016 Artificial Islands, with Nezaket Ekici, Galeria Labirynt, Lublin, Poland
- 2015 Going, Going Gone, Haifa Museum of Art, Haifa, Israel
- 2015 Solid and soft, with Nezaket Ekici, DNA gallery, Berlin, Germany
- 2015 "Fossils", with Nezaket Ekici, Petah Tikva Museum of Art, Petah Tikva, Israel
- 2014 "In Relation" with Nezaket Ekici, Saarbruken Stadt Galerie, Saarbrücken, Germany
- 2014 "All is Gold", The Municipal Gallery, Rehovot, Israel
- 2013 "In Relation" with Nezaket Ekici, Siemens Sanat, Istanbul, Turkey
- 2013 "In Relation" with Nezaket Ekici, Artisterium VI, Tbilisi, Georgia
- 2013 solo project at Threshold Gallery in "India art fair", New Delhi, India
- 2012 "In Relation" with Nezaket Ekici at Braverman Gallery, Tel Aviv
- 2012 1,2,3 Herring, MoCA Hiroshima, Hiroshima, Japan
- 2011 The Curator, Petah Tikva Museum of Art, Israel
- 2011 The Memorial employee", Dana art Gallery, Kibbutz Yad Mordechai, Israel
- 2010 Bread & Bunker, Mediations Biennale, Poznań, Poland
- 2009 Bunkerbrot, MARS Gallery, Moscow biennale, Moscow, Russia
- 2008 Bread & Bunker, G.D.K Gallery, Berlin
- 2007 Salt & Ever, The Heder Gallery, Tel Aviv
- 2005 Precise, Blurrr International Biennale, Kalisher, Tel Aviv
  - To Be An Apprentice, Avni Institute of Art and Design, Jaffa
- 2004 The Agency, Hakibbutz gallery, Tel Aviv

== Group exhibitions ==
=== 2016 ===
- Exhibition of works from the Museum of Contemporary Art in Kraków at the MAXXI, Rome, Italy
- The 9th Tbilisi Annual International Contemporary Art exhibition, Tbilisi History Museum, Tbilisi, Georgia
- VideoMedeja Festival, Novi Sad, Serbia
- 5th Radial Festival, I.D. Festival Berlin, Berlin, Germany
- The Sea, Museum of Contemporary Art in Kraków, Kraków, Poland
- Urban Touch, Kunsthalle Faust, Hanover
- Fundamental- the 5th Mediations Biennale, National Museum Poznań, Poznań, Poland
- The Pleasure of Love, The 56th October Salon, Belgrade Culture Center, Belgrade, Serbia
- Extremely Loud and Incredibly Close, Haifa Museum of Art, Haifa
- Subspace, International Photography Festival, Tel Aviv
- Universum, International Photography Festival, Tel Aviv
- Medicine in Art, Museum of Contemporary Art in Kraków, Kraków, Poland
- Things to Come, Petah Tikva Museum of Art, Petah Tikva
- Berlin Case, APT Art Gallery, Yekaterinburg, Russia
- Torrance Art Museum (ArtVideoKOELN and the New Museum of Networked Art), Los Angeles, United States

=== 2015 ===
- Shoot: about performance, DNA gallery, Berlin, Germany
- Recurrence, Nimac. Nicosia, Cyprus
- Re:Start – Braverman Gallery, Tel Aviv
- Changing Perspectives – Haifa Museum of Art, Haifa
- DNA Berlin Solid and Soft
- Hospitalshof Stuttgart, Stuttgart Ich und Du

=== 2014 ===
- Ekpharsis, Hermitage, Saint-Petersburg, Russia
- In creation, Museum of Contemporary Art (MoCA), Taipei, Taiwan
- The Winners, Haifa Museum of Art, Israel
- Les Rencontres Internationales, Haus der Kulturen der Welt, Berlin, Germany
- Beyond, Galerie Maubert, Paris, France
- Les Rencontres Internationales, Gaîté Lyrique (Palais de Tokyo), Paris, France

=== 2013 ===
- WPA's Experimental Media 2013, The Phillips Collection, Washington D.C., United States.
- Faust Kunsthalle,"Schwerelos", Hanover, Germany.
- "The Compromised Land", Neuberger Museum of Art, Purchase, New York, United States
- Panorama Weserburg, Bremen, Germany
- The Wro Biennale, Wrocław, Poland
- Kino der Kunst, Munich, Germany
- SAU Affero gallery, NJ, "Awards Images Moving and Art "Global

=== 2012 ===
- The Mediations Biennale, Poznań, Poland
- The 2nd Ural Industrial Biennale of Contemporary Art, Yekaterinburg, Russia
- Catastrophes and Incidences [sic], DNA gallery, Berlin, Germany
- Afterwards, Total Museum, Seoul, Korea
- Laguna art prize, Arsenale, Venice, Italy
- Middle East Europe, Dox Gallery, Prague, Czech Republic

=== 2011 ===
- Art is Art is Art, Moscow Museum of Modern Art, Moscow, Russia
- The Museum, Presents Itself, Tel Aviv Museum of Art, Tel Aviv, Israel
- Nord Art international exhibition, Büdelsdorf, Germany
- Spring Exhibition, Kunsthal Charlottenborg, Copenhagen, Denmark

=== 2010 ===
- As I remember, Kunstraum und Ateliers, Dresden, Germany
- Celeste prize finalists, The Invisible Dog, New York City, United States
- The Meaning of Windows, Israel Museum youth wing, Jerusalem, Israel
- Israeli Video, Haifa Museum of Art, Israel
- Trembling Time, TATE Modern, London – Screenings program dedicated to recent video art from Israel, Curators: Stuart Komer and Sergio Edelsztein
- The Calm Before the Storm, Winzavod, Moscow

=== 2009 ===
- 3rd Moscow Biennale, Moscow, Curator: Irena Yshkova
- Nuit Blanch, Paris, France, Curator: Marie Shek
- Tina b Festival of Art, Prague
- FUSO International Video Art Annual of Lisbon, Lisbon, Portugal
- Naoussa International Film Festival, Greece
- Athens Video Art Festival 2009, Athens, Greece
- Performance Evening, Israel Museum Sculpture Garden, Jerusalem, curator: Amitai Mendelson

=== 2008 ===
- Real Thing, Braverman Gallery, Tel Aviv
- Wa(h)re Kunst, Concent art e.V. Gallery, Berlin, Germany
- First Show, Contemporary Art from the Israel Museum, Mani House, Tel Aviv
- EPAF 2008, European Performance Art Festival, Warsaw
- Freeze, Israel Museum, Real Time Art in Israel 1998–2008, Jerusalem, Israel

=== 2007 ===
- Homecoming Artist, Magmart I video under volcano, Naples, Italy
- Homecoming Artist, 700.is, Egilsstadir, Iceland
- Rites & Rituals, Herzliya Museum of Contemporary Art, Herzliya
- A Quest from Sea to Sea, video, Israel Museum youth wing, Jerusalem
- Homecoming Artist, video, exhibition for awards winners by the Ministry of Education And Culture, Petah Tikva Museum of Art, Petah Tikva, Israel

=== 2006 ===
- Cover, Galataperform, Istanbul, Turkey
- Gefilte tish, Israel Museum youth wing, Jerusalem

=== 2005 ===
- Precise, Blur 5 International Biennale for Performance Art, Tel Aviv
- Cover, L.M.P Theatre, C.R.A.N.E Art Tulage, Chateau de Chevigny, France

=== 2003 ===
- Freeze, Blur 4 International Biennale for Performance Art, Jaffa
- Soak Art Focus 4, Jerusalem

== Gallery ==
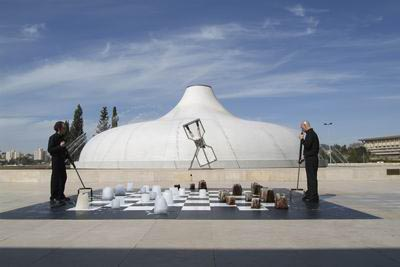
Still from "Freeze", Israel Museum Collection

== Articles ==
- HA'ARETZ – GUIDE, 2 April 2010
- City Mouse, 27 May 2010
- "Tel Aviv", TIME OUT – Fresh Paint, 29 April 2010
- ISLAND CHANNEL, HAARETZ-FRONT, 17 August 2010
- BELLEMODE, 1 September 2010
- "Tower of Babel", Pnai Plus, 28 September 2010
- THE JERUSALEM POST – METRO, 15 October 2010
- Yediot Hanegev, 12 November 2010
