= American brown bat =

American brown bat may refer to several species of vesper bats native to the Americas:

- Big brown bat (Eptesicus fuscus), a larger species widely distributed across North America, Central America, and northern South America.
- Little brown bat (Myotis lucifugus), a smaller species common throughout North America.

== See also ==
- Brown bat (disambiguation)
- Eptesicus — genus containing many species commonly called serotines or brown bats.
