= Seven Tubs Recreation Area =

Recreation area in Luzerne County, Pennsylvania

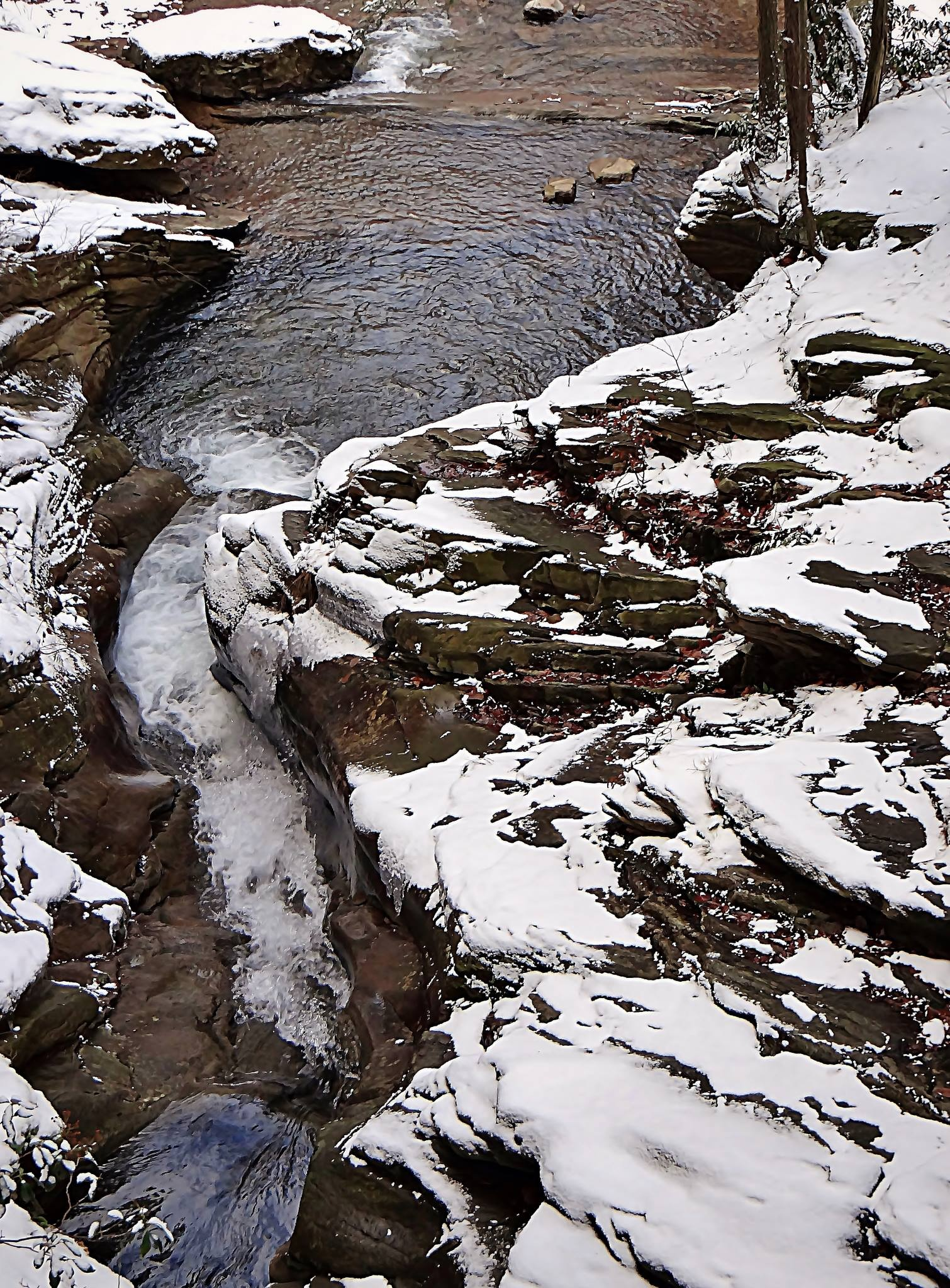
- Seven Tubs in winter

- Location within Pennsylvania
- Location: Wilkes-Barre, Luzerne, Pennsylvania, United States
- Coordinates: 41.235°N 75.8139°W
- Area: 537 acres (217 ha)
- Governing body: Luzerne County Parks and Recreation Department

Seven Tubs Recreation Area is a publicly accessible recreation area located in Luzerne County, Pennsylvania, and owned by the Pennsylvania Department of Conservation and Natural Resources. Continuously flowing glacial meltwater gouged a line of smooth tubs in gritty sandstone over 12,000 years ago. The tubs are potholes formed by the flowing water. The site is part of a 537-acre (2.17 km^{2}) recreation area in the Pennsylvania mountains about 4 miles (6.4 km) south of downtown Wilkes-Barre. The site is popular among hikers for its easy accessibility and beginner-level hiking environment.

== Geology ==
The glaciers of the Ice Age were instrumental in shaping the physical features of the natural world that we see today. They too are responsible for the formations of the tubs. As ice melts over long periods of time, its eroding capabilities become much more substantial. Glacial melting produced large volumes of flowing water for many years, contributing to formations in the different types of rock common to the area. Common geological rock classifications in the area are limestone, shale, and coal, but the tubs are formed mainly out of gritty sandstone.

Wheelbarrow Run is a stream that runs through the tubs and eventually meets up with the larger Laurel Run. Both flows have cut gorges and canyons out of the surrounding landscapes that have created an opportunity for hikers to explore. This area is known as Whirlpool Valley.

== Wildlife ==
=== Flora ===
Wildflowers are a common site among the foliage around the tubs and the surrounding forests. The northeast is home to many different types of wildflower and the tubs is no exception.

"About 60 kinds of wildflowers have been observed, including pearly everlasting (Anaphalis margaritacea), wild lettuce (Prenanthes alba), jack-in-the-pulpit (Arisaema triphyllum), closed gentian (Gentiana andrewsii), pink lady's slipper (Cypripedium acaule), self-heal (Prunella vulgaris), small round-leaved orchis (Orchis rotundifolia), and harebell (Campanula rotundifolia). Tailing arbutus (Epigaea repens), mountain laurel (Kalmia latifolia), sheep laurel (Kalmia angustifolia), and blueberry also thrive here."

There is a multitude of categories of foliage in the area. The trees in the area vary greatly and are fairly dense in vegetation. The vegetation surrounding the tubs includes hemlock and yellow, grey, and black birch trees, as well as white and red chestnuts. Bear oaks are a common sight among the foliage as well as the tulip tree, red and striped maples, big-tooth and quaking aspens, American sycamore, American beech, white ash, slippery elm, sassafras, white gum, witch-hazel, flowering dogwood, staghorn sumac, as well as white, red, and pitch pines.

=== Fauna ===
Bird-watchers can gain a glimpse of many species of birds through a visitation of the tubs. The tubs offer a possibility to view some of the birds that are becoming a rarity in the northeast region of the state. Depending on the seasonality of the birds in the area and the time at which hikers and visitors experience the tubs, different bird types can be viewed and observed. Common to the area are the whippoorwill and saw-whet owl, both of which are becoming scarce across much of their normal habitat. Also, the barred owl, eastern towhee, yellow-shafted flicker, brown thrasher, and eastern wood pewee can be seen here. Game birds are frequent to the area as well and include wild turkey and ruffed grouse.

=== Animal life ===
Not only does the tubs provide a wide array of foliage and flora, many mammalian species can be observed in their natural habitats. A diverse spectrum of animal size can be observed, some to be taken more seriously than others. Deer, long-tailed weasel, red and gray foxes, opossum, and brown bat are all creatures that may be encountered through a visit to the tubs. Perhaps of most concern is the possible encounter of a black bear. Black bears can seem like docile creatures and are the smallest of the three types of bears in the northeast section of the country; however they should be heeded with great caution. Bear sightings are not extremely frequent, but they do reside in the area. If confronted by a black bear, it is highly recommended to “speak calmly and back away slowly”.

== Activities ==
A path follows the tubs up the mountain. Certain elements of the path are wheelchair accessible and stairs are used in a few select locations to aid in descending the terrain. Also, the shade brought about by the foliage as well as the coolness of the water and its flow, all contribute to a drop in temperature in close proximity to the tubs. Be wary of loose rocks and slippery moss, for they have a tendency to cause loose footing. There are not many signs that warn of these dangers, so be cautious in hiking the intricacies of the tubs. When construction is completed, Seven Tubs will be the northern terminus of the D&L Trail—a 165-mile (266 km), multi-use rail trail.

== Nearby attractions ==
There are many state parks around the northeast part of Pennsylvania. Closest in proximity to the tubs are Archbald Pothole, Ricketts Glenn, Frances Slocum, Nay Aug Park, Tobyhanna, McDade Park and Gouldsboro parks. Although many of the parks of the northeast Pennsylvania region have similar overall characteristics, each also has individual features that can provide a different nature experience.
