= Archbald Pothole State Park =

State park in Lackawanna County, Pennsylvania

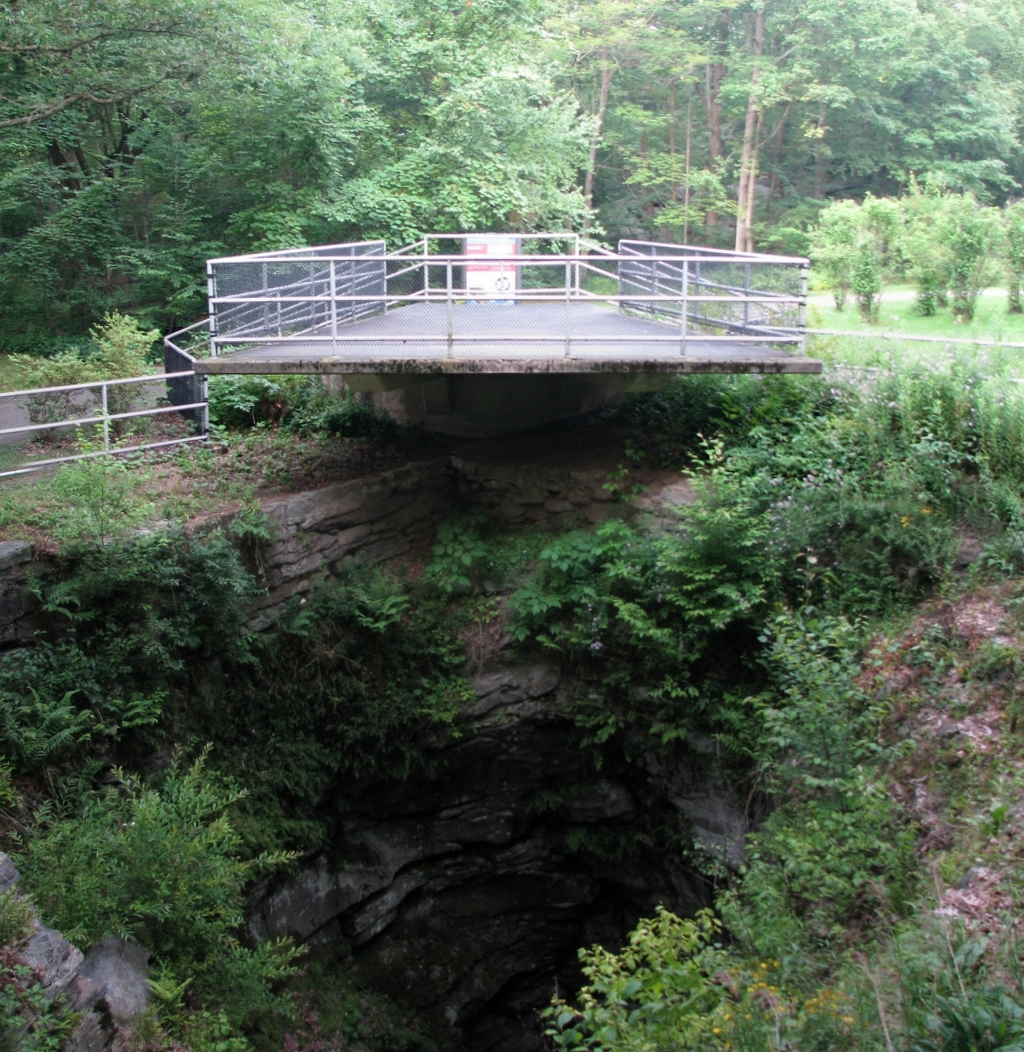
- The pothole

- Location within Pennsylvania Location within the United States
- Interactive map of Archbald Pothole State Park
- Location: Archbald, Pennsylvania, United States
- Coordinates: 41°30′47″N 75°34′33″W
- Area: 150 acres (61 ha)
- Elevation: 1,122 feet (342 m)
- Established: 1964
- Administrator: Pennsylvania Department of Conservation and Natural Resources
- Website: Official website
- Pennsylvania State Parks

Archbald Pothole State Park is a 150-acre (61 ha) Pennsylvania state park in Archbald, Lackawanna County, Pennsylvania. The focal point of the park is Archbald Pothole. The pothole is a remnant of the Wisconsin Glacial Period, 38 feet (11.6 m) deep with a largest diameter of 42 feet (12.8 m) by 24 feet (7.3 m). It has drawn tourists since just after it was discovered in 1884. Archbald Pothole State Park is on U.S. Route 6 Business in the borough of Archbald.

== History ==
A coal miner, Patrick Mahon, discovered Archbald Pothole in 1884. Mahon was extending a mine shaft. When he set off a blast of explosives, water and stones came pouring into the mine shaft. He and the other miners fled the scene fearing for their lives. The manager of the mining company, Edward Jones, came to investigate. Jones ordered that the area be cleared of the fallen debris. Almost 1,000 tons of small rounded stones were removed and Jones soon realized that the vertical tunnel discovered by the coal miners was a large pothole.

After serving as a ventilation shaft for the mine, the pothole was fenced in by the owner of the land, Colonel Hackley, for tourists. The pothole soon became a renowned tourist attraction. Edward Jones led the tours for the locals and famous geologists. Archbald Pothole was turned over to public ownership in 1914, when the widow of Colonel Hackley deeded 1-acre (4,000 m^{2}) surrounding the pothole to the Lackawanna Historical Society. Lackawanna County gained ownership of the pothole and the surrounding 150 acres (61 ha) in 1940. Archbald Pothole was a county park until 1961 when the property was transferred to the Commonwealth of Pennsylvania. Archbald Pothole State Park was formally opened in 1964.

While the pothole and surrounding park were long a popular tourist attraction, by the 1990s attendance had fallen and the facilities were in need of repair. The park was closed for a $170,000 "facelift" and when it reopened in 1997 it had been repaved and had new landscaping and new trash receptacles. Despite the improvements, attendance remained low and litter thrown into the pothole was still a problem, including "bottles and paper bags... a parking meter, a park bench and a "Wet Floor" cone". Another problem was the park's "unsavory reputation" as a place for "men looking for sex", with plainclothes police arresting 29 men there for "lewd behavior" in one 2002 sweep. In an attempt to address these issues, in 2002 the Pennsylvania State Legislature approved more improvements to the park, including "least two soccer fields, a basketball court, a tennis court, a walking trail, a playground, roads and parking areas".

== Geology ==
Archbald Pothole is 38 feet (11.6 m) deep and 42 feet (12.8 m) wide at its maximum diameter. The pothole cuts through layers of sandstone, shale and coal. A pothole, in geologic terms, is a hole that is worn into the bedrock of a stream in strong rapids or at the base of a waterfall. The force of the water spins rock fragments, sand and gravel into a small indentation in the bedrock. After years and years of constant spinning, the stones and sands carve out an elliptical hole. Potholes are also formed by the action of glacial meltwater. Archbald Pothole is an example of just such a pothole.

Archbald Pothole was formed during the Wisconsin Glacial Period. As the glacier melted, a stream that flowed on top may have fallen into a crevasse and then fell to the bedrock. The force of the falling water created a pothole in much the same way that a waterfall creates a pothole. The pothole was filled by falling sand, rocks and gravel as the glacier retreated and created other potholes. Archbald Pothole was preserved underground for nearly 15,000 years until its discovery by Patrick Mahon.

=== Nearby glacial formations ===
- Hickory Run State Park - Hickory Run State Park is in the nearby Pocono Mountains. There are 14 acres (5.7 ha) of jumbled stone caused by the actions of the glaciers during the latest glacial period. The glacial moraine crosses the park.
- Seven Tubs Natural Area - The Seven Tubs Natural Area is about four miles (6 km) southeast of downtown Wilkes-Barre. Also known as Whirlpool Valley, Seven Tubs is a series of potholes eroded into the bedrock. A hiking trail passes by the seven tub-shaped potholes. Seven Tubs Natural Area is owned by Luzerne County. It is a popular, but dangerous swimming hole for the daredevils of the area.
- Tannersville Cranberry Bog - Tannersville Cranberry Bog is in Pocono Township, Monroe County. This bog, owned by The Nature Conservancy, is the southernmost low-altitude hemiboreal bog. The bog is home to rare orchids and some carnivorous plants like sundew and the pitcher plant.

== Recreation ==
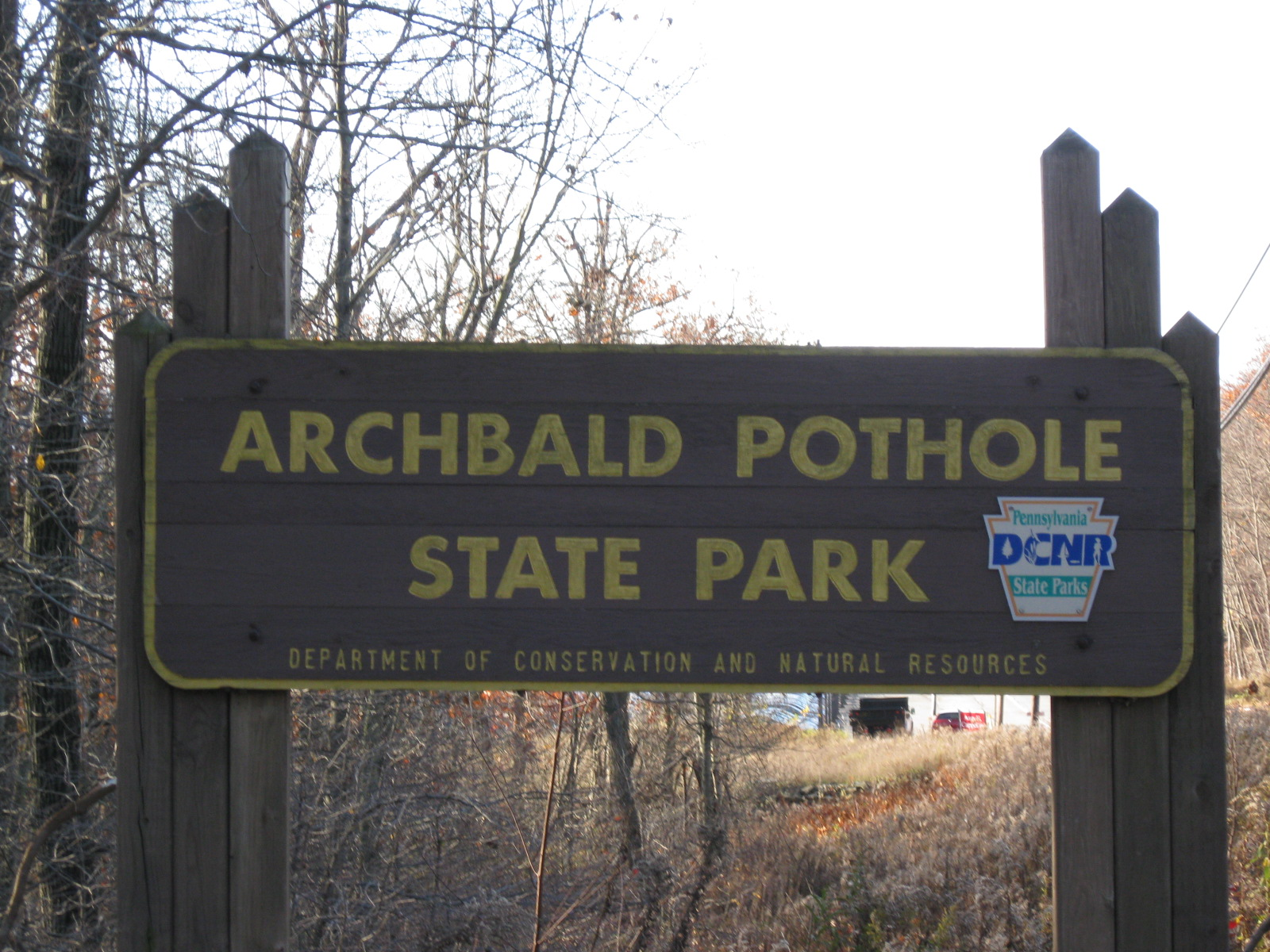
Park entrance sign

A small loop trail follows an old coal mine tram road for hiking. The trail passes along a rock ledge and through a forest.

Hunting is permitted on over 100 acres (40 ha) of the park. The most common game species are squirrels, turkeys and white-tailed deer. The hunting of groundhogs is not permitted. Hunters are expected to follow the rules and regulations of the Pennsylvania State Game Commission.

Some of the parkland was stripped off in the past by strip mining. This land is currently undergoing a reclamation process and there are plans to use the reclaimed land for recreation and to build athletic fields.
