= Everyday (video) =

2006 viral Internet video

everyday
- Starring: Noah Kalina
- Music by: Carly Comando
- Release date: 8 August 2006
- Running time: 5:45
- Country: United States

Everyday is an ongoing art project by American photographer Noah Kalina that gained widespread attention when the first segment of the project, Noah takes a photo of himself every day for 6 years, also titled everyday, was released in 2006 and became a viral video. The first everyday video features a fast montage of thousands of pictures of Kalina spanning a period of six years all played sequentially as a time lapse. Subsequent releases have followed this format and viewers are able to watch Kalina age.

== First release and response ==
=== 6 Years ===
Kalina began taking a photo of himself every day starting on January 10, 2000, at age 19. The video Everyday shows the photos chronologically, six per second, with an original piano score by Slingshot Dakota, Kalina's former girlfriend. Throughout the compilation, Kalina's face remains emotionless in the center of the frame. Kalina uploaded the video to Vimeo on August 8, 2006, and YouTube on August 27, 2006.

Kalina had originally intended Everyday to be a photo project, but was encouraged to make a film after seeing a video by Ahree Lee, which consisted of time-lapse portraits of the artist. He compiled his photographs into a video.

As of 2025, the video has more than 27 million views on YouTube.

In a New York Times article, William A. Ewing, director of the Musée de l'Élysée, was quoted as saying, "Noah's video represents a phenomenal amplification not just in what he produced and how he did it, but how many people the piece touched in such a short period of time. There is nothing comparable in the history of photography."

Everyday was featured on an episode of VH1's Web Junk 20 and on commercials for Time Warner Cable's Roadrunner service. The Simpsons episode "Eternal Moonshine of the Simpson Mind" includes an adaptation of Kalina's video; in that scene, 39 years of Homer Simpson's life flash before him while Comando's score for Everyday is playing. The National Basketball Association (NBA) used Comando's score for Everyday during the "Where Amazing Happens" ad campaign from 2007 to 2012.

In December 2006, because of the notoriety of Everyday, VH1 commissioned Kalina to take photographs of himself in the same pose used in Everyday, but alongside various celebrities, including Paris Hilton, Lance Bass, David Hasselhoff, Jenna Jameson, will.i.am, Flavor Flav, lonelygirl15 and "Weird Al" Yankovic. The photographs were taken backstage at the VH1 Big in '06 Awards. In the televised ceremony, several of the pictures were shown before and after commercial breaks.

== Subsequent releases ==
=== 12 Years ===
On July 16, 2012, Kalina announced an extension to his Everyday video on his website. The extended video, released to YouTube on September 4, shows 12 years, 5 months of his self-portraits with a run time of 7:41 (10 frames per second—1 month every 3 seconds). In 2016, the project was described in academic work as having "archival persistence".

=== 20 Years ===
On January 14, 2020, Kalina released to YouTube "Noah takes a photo of himself every day for 20 years" showing 20 years of his self-portraits with a run time of 8:17 (15 frames per second—1 month every 2 seconds).

=== 21 Years ===
On July 13, 2021, Kalina released the video "7777 Days" that shows him aging 21 years over the course of 2 minutes. For this video, data scientist, neuroscientist, and programmer Michael Notter used artificial intelligence to align and blend Kalina's face.

=== 23 Years ===
On January 10, 2023, Kalina released everyday.photo, a new website to house his everyday project. The site breaks down each day and photo in the project by its location, the clothing and accessories Kalina is wearing, and the length of Kalina's beard. Each day from the project is able to be minted on the blockchain as an NFT.

== See also ==
- Lifelog
- Up (film series)
