= Knife (song) =

Single by Grizzly Bear

from the album Yellow House
- B-side: "Easier" (Alternate edit)
- Released: 21 May 2007
- Length: 5:14 (album version); 3:45 (single version)
- Label: Warp Records
- Songwriters: Ed Droste, Christopher Bear, Chris Taylor
- Producer: Chris Taylor

Grizzly Bear singles chronology
"On a Neck, On a Spit" (2007)	"Knife" (2007)	"Two Weeks" (2009)

"Knife" is a song by Brooklyn-based indie rock band Grizzly Bear, released as the second single from the band's second studio album, Yellow House on May 21, 2007.

== Music video ==
The video for "Knife" was directed by Isaiah Saxon and Sean Hellfritsch of Encyclopedia Pictura. It features the band members in the desert sun operating a machine, a bearded person and a creepy creature made of dust and rocks.

Daniel Rossen explained about the music video:

I was very skeptical of them when they first came around. The ideas that they had before that one were so much more insane. You have no idea. Fucking absurd. It was all this weird symbolism and a lot of really sexual stuff. Initially it was like Ed with a replica of himself on his back and out of the replica of himself is birthed this weird phantom beast that is some kind of monster version of himself. And he like makes out with the monster on the beach and the rest of us were like water nymphs screaming and swimming in circles. It was totally crazy.

== Track listing ==
No.	Title	Length
1.	"Knife"	3:45
2.	"Easier" (alternate edit)	3:48

== Reception ==
"Knife" was ranked No. 109 on Pitchfork Media's list of the top 500 tracks of the 2000s. Describing the song, reviewer Brian Howe wrote: "There are just a few words, inscribed in a lavish script on the harmonies; a handful of chords. But a whole host of sensations pour through them, and not just emotional ones: The guitars prickle and clutch; the refrains scale ear-popping altitudes. You can, it turns out, feel the knife."
