= Adam Lisagor =

American commercial director

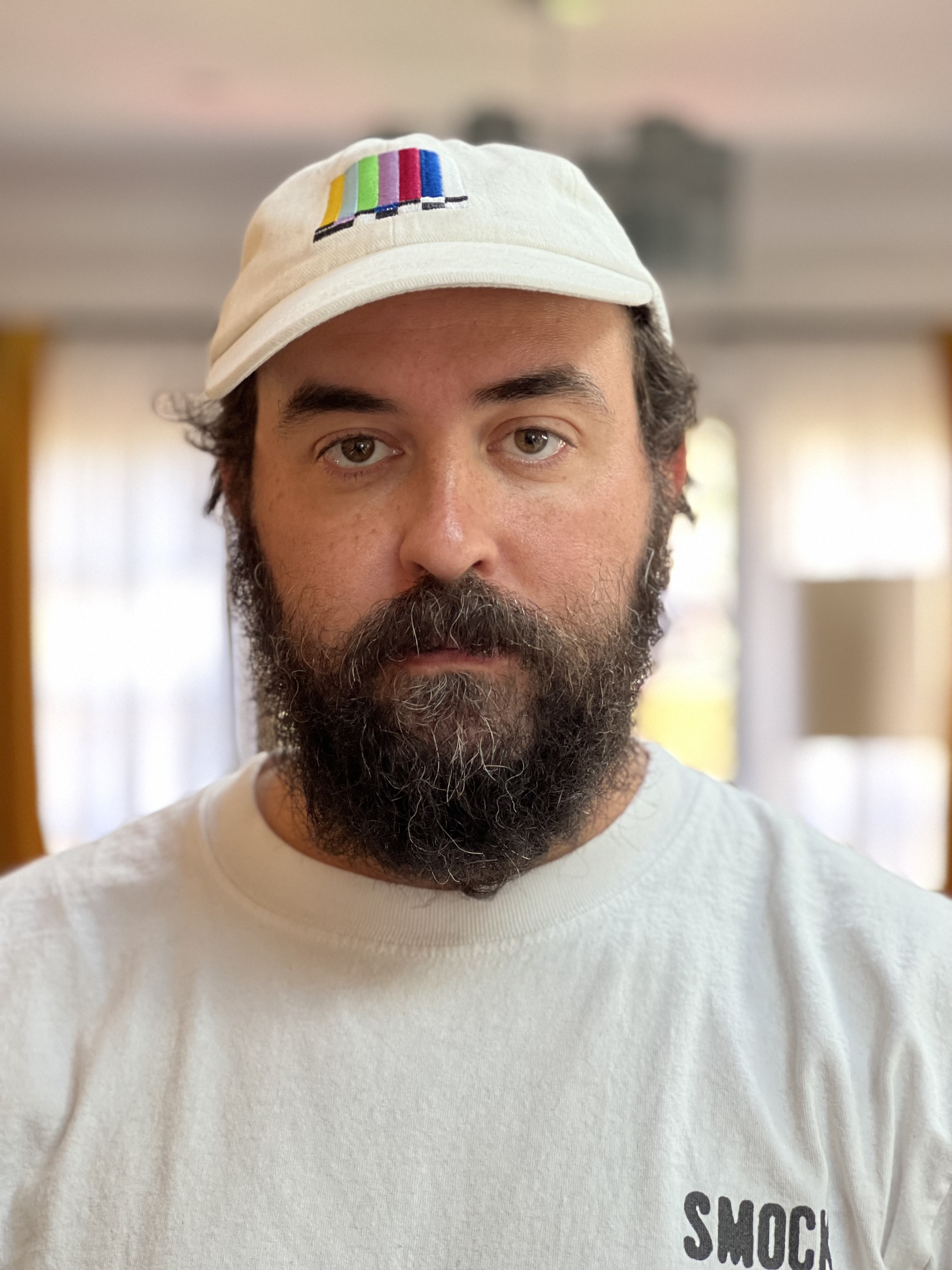
- Born: February 25, 1978 (age 48); Camarillo, California
- Education: New York University (BFA, 2000)
- Occupations: Founder, Sandwich (2010 – present)
- Years active: 2000-present
- Known for: Sandwich
- Partner: Roxana Altamirano (2003-present)
- Children: 2
- Website: Official website

Adam David Lisagor (born February 25, 1978) is an American commercial director and the founder of Sandwich, a creative advertising studio and production company focused primarily on technology. He has also made on-camera appearances as a pitchman for various tech companies and products.

== Early life and education ==
Lisagor was born and raised in Camarillo, California. He graduated from New York University's Tisch School of the Arts in 2000 with a BFA in film production.

== Career ==
=== Visual effects ===
After editing for a commercial production company in New York, in 2002 Lisagor returned to Los Angeles, where he began working in visual effects on films. He worked for the visual effects company Hydraulx from 2003 to 2008 as a visual effects coordinator and compositor on films such as The Day After Tomorrow, Æon Flux and Aliens vs. Predator: Requiem.

=== Sandwich ===
Lisagor produced his first web commercial in 2009 for Birdhouse, an iPhone app he developed with his collaborator Cameron Hunt, for drafting and publishing writing on Twitter. To promote the app, Lisagor created and starred in a two-minute commercial, shot in the backyard of his apartment in Silver Lake, Los Angeles. The commercial generated interest from other tech companies looking to promote their apps in a similar fashion, and Lisagor began making commercials for these companies, with the biotechnology firm Genentech and Twitter co-founder Jack Dorsey's startup Square his first two major clients.

In 2010, Lisagor founded the Los Angeles-based video advertising company Sandwich Video, which was rebranded in 2019 as Sandwich. The firm specializes in helping startups and apps get noticed with short, entertaining, informative videos, and has earned notice for frequently accepting a combination of cash, equity and revenue sharing from a client in lieu of full payment. Their videos are typically one-and-a-half to two minutes long. They also work with larger clients and ad agencies, and produce television commercials in addition to online video ads.

Sandwich's clients include Block (formerly Square), Airbnb, Warby Parker, Robinhood, Slack, Salesforce, TrueCar, eBay, CenturyLink, Uber, and Lyft. The firm's 2014 ad for Coin, which Lisagor appeared in, earned over 7 million views in its first month on YouTube, had 9.7 million views by the end of the year.

As of September 2022, Lisagor has appeared in over 40 of Sandwich's 500 branded videos, including those for Block, TrueCar, and Flipboard, as an accessible, deadpan Everyman type. Inc. magazine called him "the Martin Scorsese of online video advertising" and Bloomberg Businessweek noted that he is "the director of choice among Silicon Valley startups looking to gain visibility." Sandwich spots have been praised for their minimalist style and charming, passionate tone. Fast Company called the firm "the premier producer of online product videos for web services and tech gadgets."

Sandwich Fund was announced in March 2015 as a venture partnership with Detroit-based Ludlow Ventures for investing in early-stage startups by funding the production of launch videos in exchange for equity participation.

Following the 2016 Presidential Election, Lisagor began creating video content for activist causes and left-wing political candidates under the name Special Projects.

In February 2022, Sandwich announced the creation of Sandwich+, a production banner to support narrative filmmaking from writer/directors within the Sandwich network. Its first outing, the short film “Aspirational Slut” went on to win the audience award at the South by Southwest film festival in 2022.

=== Podcast and web series ===
From 2008 to 2013 and again in 2020, Lisagor co-hosted and produced the comedic podcast You Look Nice Today with Merlin Mann and Scott Simpson. He also produced the men's fashion web series Put This On with public radio show host Jesse Thorn from 2009 to 2011.

In October 2015, Lisagor co-created and directed the 1980s-inspired technology comedy series Computer Show.

In October 2020, Lisagor and Noah Kalina launched the podcast All Consuming, where they review direct-to-consumer brands that advertise to them on Instagram.

== Personal life ==
Lisagor lives in Los Angeles, California, with his partner, Roxana Altamirano, and their two children. He is Jewish and first started growing his beard at age 24.
