= DIY.org =

Online learning community

- Area served: 160+ countries
- Website: diy.org
- Launched: May 2012

DIY is an online skill-building platform designed specifically for children. Its website houses a variety of multi-media content designed to teach children various skills, in the context of a global interest-based community. The skills learned on DIY are largely creative and maker-focused.

== History ==
DIY was originally founded by Vimeo co-founder Zach Klein, Andrew Sliwinski, and Encyclopedia Pictura’s Isaiah Saxon and Daren Rabinovitch in May 2012. The company launched a second online children's educational platform in 2016 called JAM.com, which was subscription-based and more focused on a course structure for learning versus DIY's free and badge-based skill building structure.

DIY was later acquired in 2019 by LittleBits, after which JAM.com was merged into DIY.org.

It was bought back by Zach Klein in 2020.

It was then acquired again in February 2021 by Kyt Technologies Pte. Ltd., which was founded by Bhavik Rathod and Tripti Ahuja. Kyt Technologies Pte. Ltd raised $7.5 million in a Series A funding round. The investment is led by Alpha Wave Incubation (AWI), a venture fund managed by Falcon Edge Capital. Sequoia Capital India's Surge, January Capital, Titan Capital and other angel investors also participated in the round. On April 30, 2024, the DIY website was closed and the DIY app removed from the App Store and Google Play due to difficulties within the company.

DIY was once more acquired by AstroSafe and returned in February 2025, with the Android version returning on July 22, 2025.

== Description ==
DIY members can choose from a selection of courses, challenges, activities, workshops and earn experience points and skill badges on their completion. While the website is generally creative and maker-focused, the skills covered are broad, including things like biology, botany, app development, art, mechanical engineering, camping, gaming, and more. DIY also features a child-friendly social community that lets its members post their work and explore other user content, among other social features.

Each child user on DIY gets a profile, an avatar, and a digital portfolio in which to collect, store and display all the badges they earn by completing different challenges and projects throughout the platform. The goal of the digital portfolio is to provide users with a shareable portfolio of skills that can be academically and professionally referenced.

== Features ==
- How-to videos: Each set of activities has a video created by moderators explaining the end goals and a few examples of how those can be achieved.
- Courses: The courses tackle concepts in a way that are easy for children to grasp, and the information is given in bite-sized video units.
- Daily challenges: Several challenges go out every day and are posed by moderators to the DIY community at large. DIY members then take on the ones that interest them and post their findings and creations in whichever format they choose back on the platform. Challenges can also be posed by DIY members to their peers.
- Live challenges: These challenges happen over a secure live stream where moderators take the DIY members through all the steps to complete the posed challenge or project.
- Skills and badges: On completion of challenges, DIY members earn skill points or XPs. These points help the members to earn different skill badges by achieving pre-decided targets.
- Mentors: Some experts across fields of creativity are brought in to create courses. These range from baking, sketching, cartooning, playing instruments, gaming, animation, and more.
