= Seventeen Evergreen =

American musical duo

Seventeen Evergreen is a San Francisco based duo, composed of Caleb Pate and Nephi Evans, which stylistically weaves psychedelic rock with electronic experimentation. They record on their own Pacific Radio Fire imprint and license material to UK label, Lucky Number Music—also home to Sebastien Tellier. Life Embarrasses Me On Planet Earth, their debut album, was released in the U.S. in 2005. Lucky Number Music released a remixed version in 2007 and distributed it in Europe and Japan.

The band has garnered a following in Europe and has appeared on Rob Da Bank's BBC Radio 1 show, and on BBC 6 Music. They played at the 2007 End of the Road Festival in Dorset, England.

== Discography ==
=== Albums ===
- Life Embarrasses Me On Planet Earth. Lucky Number Music, 2007
- Steady On, Scientist!. Lucky Number Music, 2012

=== EP ===
- Psyentist. Lucky Number Music, 2012

=== Singles ===
- Haven't Been Yourself. Lucky Number Music, 2007
- Lunar One. Lucky Number Music, 2007
- Music Is The Wine. Lucky Number Music, 2007

_{DVD/Visual}

- Pictograph Slang: a visual album DVD/CD including collaborations with Encyclopedia Pictura (Björk, Spore, Grizzly Bear, Zion-I, etc.) including music videos, concert films (that have accompanied the band's live shows) and a disk of remixes, new studio tracks and unreleased exclusives. Slated for release in early 2009.
- Steady On, Scientist! visuals by Antoine Boilevin. Music videos by Brian Ziffer, Terri Timely and Sarah Applebaum Collaboration.
