= Encyclopedia Pictura =

- Industry: Film, Animation
- Founded: 2004; 22 years ago
- Founders: Isaiah Saxon, Sean Hellfritsch
- Headquarters: Los Angeles, USA
- Key people: Isaiah Saxon, Sean Hellfritsch, Daren Rabinovitch
- Website: encyclopediapictura.com

Encyclopedia Pictura is an American animation and film studio. Based in Los Angeles, it is led by directors Isaiah Saxon, Daren Rabinovitch, and Sean Hellfritsch.

Encyclopedia Pictura directs music videos, short films and commercials. The studio is known for creating ambitious music videos and short films with an organic, handmade quality.

== History ==
Isaiah Saxon and Sean Hellfritsch founded Encyclopedia Pictura as a directing duo in 2004, before expanding into a trio when Daren Rabinovitch joined in 2007, and ultimately transforming into an animation studio.

In 2007, Saxon and Hellfritsch directed the music video for the Grizzly Bear single "Knife". The video was filmed in Death Valley, CA and Brooklyn, NY. Their first major video, it was listed at #26 on Pitchfork's list of the top 50 music videos of the 2000s.

Following the "Knife" video, Encyclopedia Pictura got a call from Björk to direct a music video for her single "Wanderlust". Their concept was inspired by the work of Hayao Miyazaki, Stanley Kubrick, and Walt Disney's work from the 1930s. The video was shot at Matthew Barney's studio in New York City, in stereoscopic 3-D using a 3-D camera rig they designed and built. Combining handmade puppetry, scale modeling, CGI and live action, it took over nine months to complete. The "Wanderlust" video premiered at the Deitch Projects gallery in Long Island City, Queens, and was shown in 3-D at Saatchi & Saatchi's 2008 New Directors Showcase. It won three D&AD Yellow Pencil awards and the UK Music Video Award for Video of the Year. Spin magazine named it the best music video of 2008, and Pitchfork ranked it #21 on its list of the top 50 music videos of the 2000s.

Encyclopedia Pictura directed the animated music video for the Panda Bear song "Boys Latin", which premiered on Adult Swim in 2015. It was nominated for the UK Music Video Award for Best Animation in a Video.

== Works ==
Notable works include:

- Knife by Grizzly Bear (music video, 2007)
- Wanderlust by Björk (music video, 2008)
- DIY.org (website and related animation and graphics work, 2012–)
- The Legend of Ochi by Isaiah Saxon (film, 2025)
