= Slingshot Dakota =

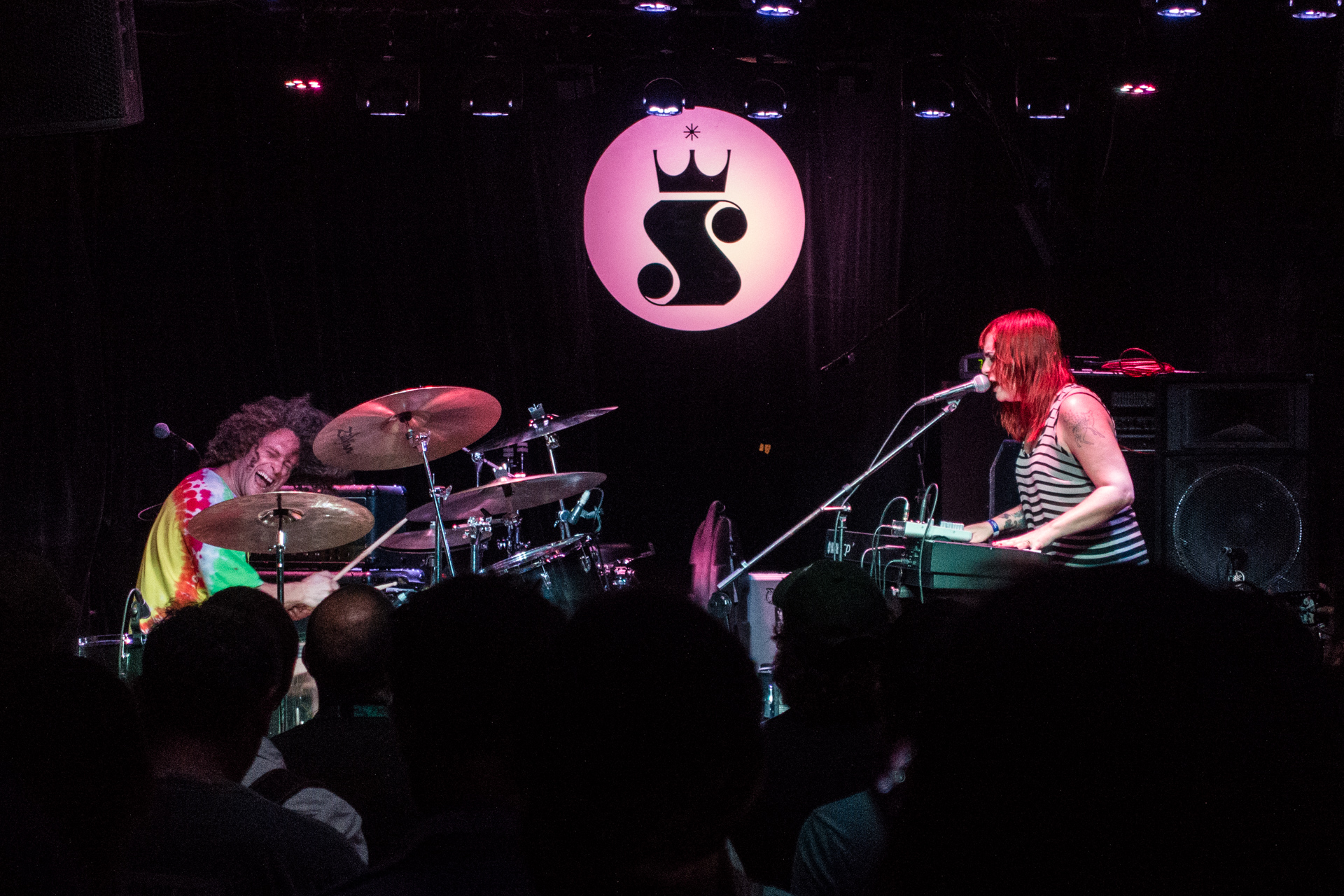

Background information
- Origin: Bethlehem, Pennsylvania
- Genres: Emo, indie pop, indie rock, punk rock
- Years active: 2003–present
- Labels: Topshelf Records, Specialist Subject Records
- Members: Carly Comando; Tom Patterson

Slingshot Dakota is an American rock band from Bethlehem, Pennsylvania.

== History ==
Slingshot Dakota formed in Long Island in 2003 as a three-piece, issuing their debut, Keener Sighs, in 2004. At the time, the group was composed of Carly Comando, Pat Schramm (of the band Latterman) and Jeff Cunningham. In the spring of 2005, Schramm was replaced by Patterson. In the fall of 2006, Cunningham left the band, and the band remained a two-piece. In November 2007, the band released its sophomore effort, Their Dreams Are Dead, but Ours Is the Golden Ghost!. The group's third full-length, Dark Hearts, was released in November 2012, after the group signed with Topshelf Records.

Comando also scored the short video Everyday by Noah Kalina and the documentary film Lily Topples the World.

== Members ==
Current

- Carly Comando – keyboards, vocals (2003–present)
- Tom Patterson – drums, vocals (2005–present)

Former

- Jeff Cunningham – guitar, vocals (2003–2006)
- Pat Schramm – drums (2003–2005)

== Discography ==
- Keener Sighs – Immigrant Sun Records (2004)
- Their Dreams Are Dead, But Ours Is the Golden Ghost! – Self-released (2007)
- Dark Hearts – Topshelf Records (2012)
- Break – Topshelf Records (2016)
- Heavy Banding – Community Records (USA), Specialist Subject Records (UK/EU) (2019)
