= Cabin Porn (book) =

2015 photo-book by Zach Klein

- Editor: Zach Klein
- Cover artist: Noah Kalina
- Publication date: 2015
- ISBN: 978-0316378215
- Followed by: Cabin Porn: Inside, 2020

Cabin Porn is a 2015 photo-book edited by Zach Klein. It includes over 200 images of cabins and temporary structures, along with instructional guides on how to build them. The book includes select photographs by photographer Noah Kalina and additional text by Wired correspondent Steven Leckart.

== Publication ==
Cabin Porn: Inspiration for Your Quiet Place Somewhere is a 2015 photo-book published by Little, Brown and Company and edited by American entrepreneur Zach Klein. It was also published in the UK by Penguin Books.

The book is a sequel to Klein's 2009 Tumblr blog by the same name.

== Synopsis ==
The book includes over 200 images of cabins, accompanied by guides on how to build varies types of simple shelters including cabins and yurts. It includes a wide range of designs, traditional and modern, wood and concrete.

== Critical reception ==
Hannah Martin writing in Architectural Digest described the images as "awesome" and the construction advice as "cool".

== Sequel ==
A sequel Cabin Porn: Inside was published in 2020.
