= Zach Klein =

American entrepreneur and investor (born 1982)

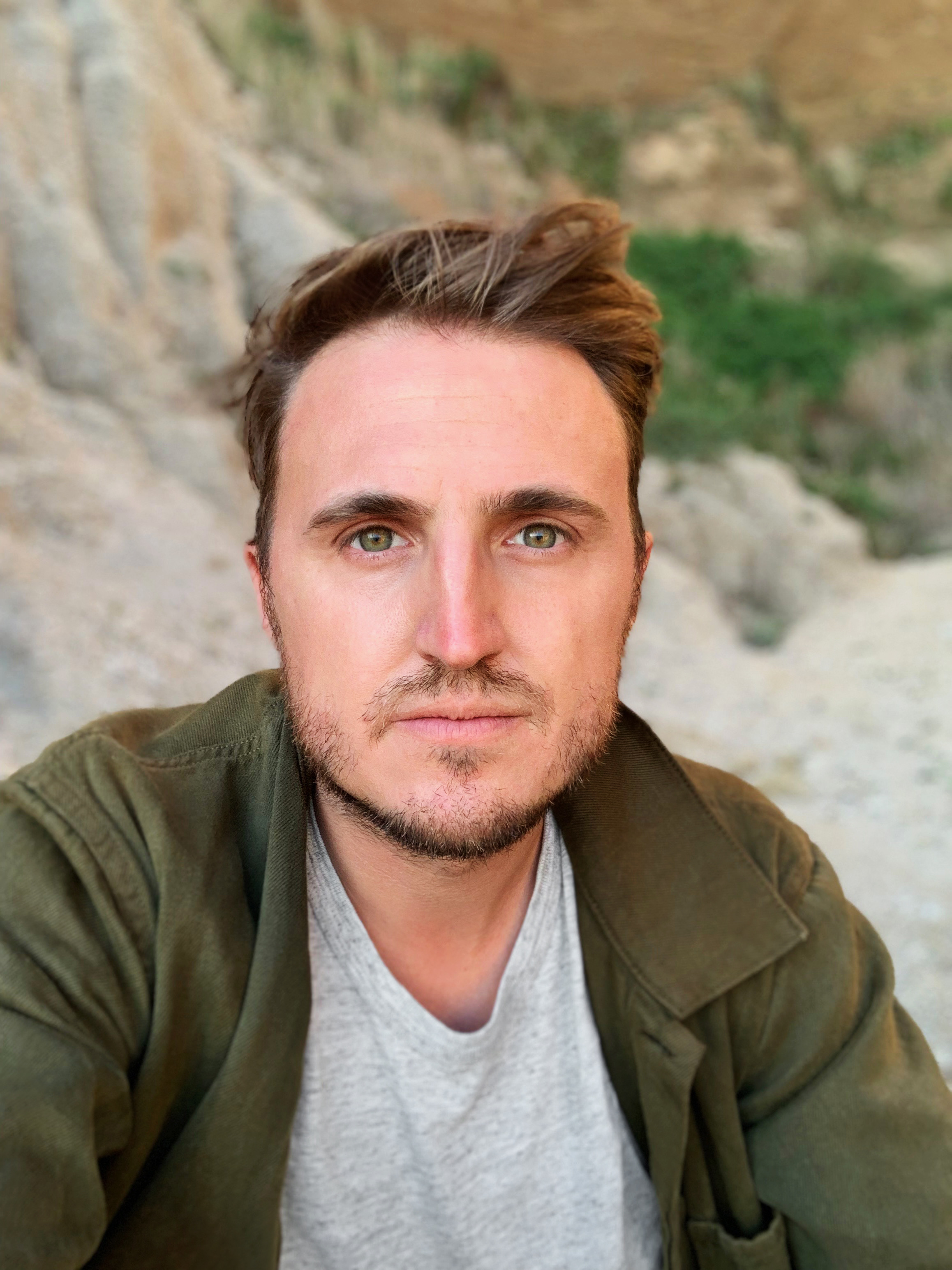
- Klein in 2019
- Born: September 26, 1982 (age 44); Rochester, New York, U.S.
- Education: Wake Forest University (BA, Studio art)
- Occupation: Entrepreneur
- Spouse: Courtney Klein
- Website: https://www.zachklein.com

Zach Klein (born September 26, 1982) is an American entrepreneur and investor, and the co-founder of Vimeo. In addition to Vimeo, he co-founded the children's learning website DIY.org and worked as an executive at Boxee, Skillshare, and as CEO of Dwell. Known for design of healthy digital communities, he has taught Interaction Design at the School of Visual Arts.

== Education ==
Klein spent his earliest years in Western New York and later lived in Fort Wayne, Indiana, where he attended Bishop Luers High School. He is a graduate of Wake Forest University where he was a studio art major.

== Career ==
He was a partner at Connected Ventures, which founded and operated CollegeHumor. He was a faculty member at the School of Visual Arts, where he taught in the MFA program in Interaction Design.

Klein created the Cabin Porn phenomenon, which was initially an online project "created by a group of friends to inspire their own homebuilding" but grew into a global phenomenon, attracting thousands of submissions from fellow cabin builders.

In February 2020, Klein was appointed as CEO of the design and technology brand Dwell.

== Selected publications ==
In 2015, Klein published the Cabin Porn photo-book followed by Cabin Porn: Inside in 2020.
