= Brown bat =

Brown bat may refer to:

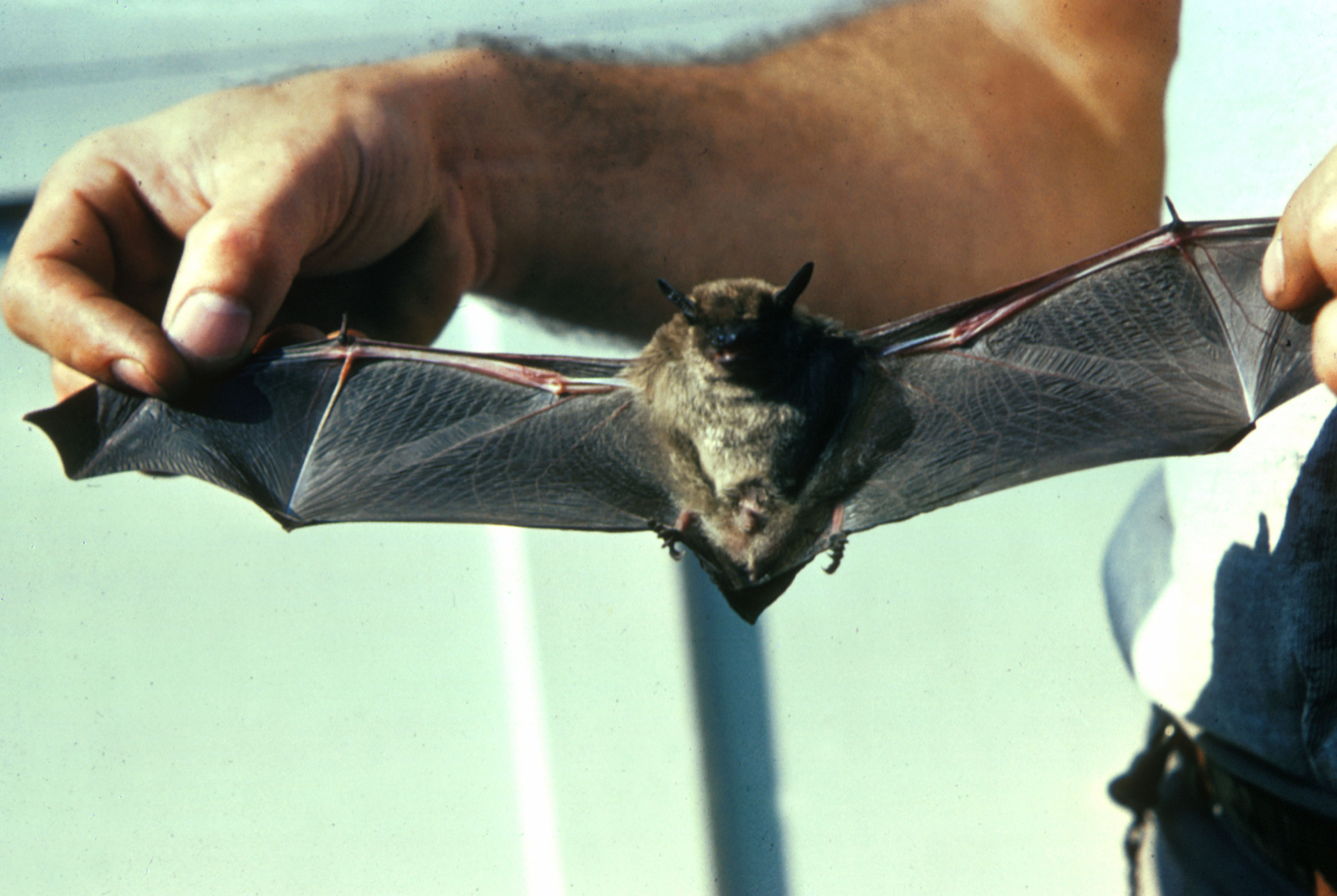
Little brown bat

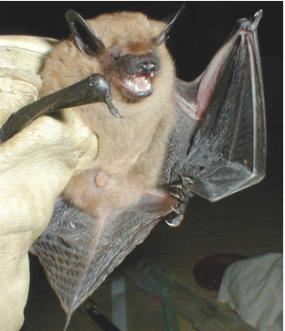
Big brown bat

== Species ==
- Little brown bat, Myotis lucifugus, one of the most common bats of North America
- Big brown bat, Eptesicus fuscus, native to North America, Central America, the Caribbean, and extreme northern South America
- Argentine brown bat, (Eptesicus furinalis), a bat species from South and Central America.
- Brown tent-making bat, (Uroderma magnirostrum), a bat species from South and Central America.

== Genus ==
- Eptesicus — genus containing many species commonly called serotines or brown bats.
