= Magmart =

Magmart is an international video arts festival which is held in Naples, Italy.

The festival is a project of an Italian studio tad (design) in partnership with the Casoria Contemporary Art Museum (CAM). The first festival was held in January 2006 with about 190 entrants from various countries around the world. The jury selected 30 videos which have become part of permanent collection of CAM. Over 220 artworks were presented during the second festival held in 2007 with a large increase in women's participation (about 33% of all artists).
