= Reckoner =

2007 song by Radiohead

Song by Radiohead

from the album In Rainbows
- Released: 10 October 2007
- Recorded: 2005–2007
- Genre: Art rock
- Length: 4:50
- Label: XL; TBD
- Songwriters: Colin Greenwood; Jonny Greenwood; Ed O'Brien; Philip Selway; Thom Yorke
- Producer: Nigel Godrich

Music video
- "Reckoner" on YouTube

"Reckoner" is a song by the English rock band Radiohead, released on their seventh album, In Rainbows (2007). It was produced by Nigel Godrich and developed while Radiohead were working on another song, "Feeling Pulled Apart by Horses". The singer, Thom Yorke, described it as the centre of In Rainbows.

Remixes were released by James Holden, Flying Lotus and Diplo. Radiohead also released the stems for fans to remix, as they had for the previous In Rainbows single, "Nude". Boosted by sales of the stems, "Reckoner" reached number 74 on the UK singles chart. In 2011, NME named it one of the greatest songs of the preceding 15 years, and Pitchfork named it one of the greatest songs of the decade.

== Recording ==
"Reckoner" developed from a different song, "Feeling Pulled Apart by Horses", which once had the same title. Radiohead wrote a coda that developed into the final song, but kept the title. Radiohead were excited about "Reckoner" and finished it quickly after recording a demo. The producer, Nigel Godrich, recalled of the recording sessions: "People [were] all over the house, shaking things and getting this groove going, then chopping it up into little pieces and putting it back together. It was a lot of fun."

== Composition ==
"Reckoner" features Thom Yorke's falsetto, "frosty, clanging" percussion, a "meandering" guitar line, piano, and strings arranged by the guitarist Jonny Greenwood. Yorke said the guitar riff was a homage to the Red Hot Chili Peppers guitarist John Frusciante "in my sort of clunky 'can't-really-pick' kind of way".

Yorke described "Reckoner" as "kind of a love song ... Sort of." He said the lyric "because we separate like ripples on a blank shore" was the centre of In Rainbows, and that "everything's leading to that point and then going away from that point". According to the bassist, Colin Greenwood, "reckoner" is a Biblical word referring to Saint Peter, who judges people at the gates of heaven. Yorke said he was unaware of this and had tried to let the melody drive the lyrics without overthinking them.

== Release ==
"Reckoner" was released on Radiohead's 2007 album In Rainbows. As they had done for their single "Nude", on September 28, 2008, Radiohead released the separate "Reckoner" stems for fans to purchase and remix. Fans could upload their remixes to the Radiohead website and vote for their favourites. The electronic musicians James Holden, Flying Lotus and Diplo also created remixes.

After the stems went on sale, "Reckoner" reached number 74 on the UK singles chart. It reached number 21 on the Bubbling Under Hot 100 Singles chart, a 25-song extension of the Billboard Hot 100. A performance of "Reckoner" was included on the 2008 live video In Rainbows – From the Basement. "Reckoner" was used in the credits of the 2008 film Choke, based on the novel by Chuck Palahniuk. The singer-songwriter Lorde used the "Reckoner" drum track while developing her 2025 song "What Was That".

== Music video ==
The "Reckoner" music video was created by Clement Picon, who won a competition held by Radiohead and the animation studio Aniboom to create an animation for an In Rainbows song. Yorke described it as one of his favourite Radiohead videos.

== Reception ==
Pitchfork wrote that "Reckoner" was not the "most immediate" song on In Rainbows, after several listens "reveals itself to be among the most woozily beautiful things the band has ever recorded". In 2011, Rolling Stone readers voted it the ninth-best Radiohead song, and NME ranked it the 93rd-best track of the preceding 15 years. Pitchfork named it the 254th-greatest song of the decade. In 2020, the Guardian named it the third-best Radiohead song, writing: "At first innocuous, 'Reckoner' unspools a full house of virtuoso performances engulfed by Godrich’s winter-blanket production. It soothes then soars."

== Charts ==
Chart performance for "Reckoner"
Chart	Peak position
UK Singles (Official Charts)	74

== Certifications ==
Certifications for "Reckoner"
Region	Certification	Certified units/sales
Canada (Music Canada)	Gold	40,000^{‡}
^{‡} Sales+streaming figures based on certification alone.
