= All I Need (Radiohead song) =

2008 song by Radiohead

Promotional single by Radiohead

from the album In Rainbows
- Released: 5 January 2009
- Recorded: 2005–2007
- Genre: Alternative rock; ambient pop; art rock; electronic
- Length: 3:48
- Label: TBD; ATO
- Songwriters: Colin Greenwood; Jonny Greenwood; Ed O'Brien; Philip Selway; Thom Yorke
- Producer: Nigel Godrich

Music video
- "All I Need" on YouTube

"All I Need" is a song by the English rock band Radiohead, produced by Nigel Godrich. It was released as a promotional single on 5 January 2009, from their seventh studio album, In Rainbows (2007). "All I Need" is a downtempo track with lyrics about obsession and unrequited love.

The music video for "All I Need" premiered on 1 May 2008 on MTV in support of the MTV EXIT campaign, which promotes awareness and increases prevention of human trafficking and modern slavery. The video contrasts the lives of two boys from different economic backgrounds and won 16 awards.

== Recording ==
Radiohead debuted "All I Need" at their 20 June 2006 performance at the Auditorium Theatre in Chicago, Illinois. Singer Thom Yorke told the audience that they had just "sketched [the song] out earlier and might get it wrong".

Radiohead recorded "All I Need" for their seventh studio album, In Rainbows (2007). They used a fan recording of the debut performance, uploaded to YouTube, as a reference when working in the studio; Yorke said: "It's all crunchy, it's all from mobile phone but... that's sort of an element of it I really find incredibly exciting."

Guitarist Jonny Greenwood wanted to capture the sensation of white noise generated by "a band playing loudly in a room, when all this chaos kicks up". Unable to produce the sound in a recording studio, Greenwood instead had a string section, the Millennia Ensemble, play every note of the scale, blanketing the audio frequencies. He also overdubbed his own viola playing.

Guitarist Ed O'Brien used a guitar strung with four bottom E strings, creating a thicker sound, combined with a sustain unit (allowing notes to be sustained indefinitely) and delay pedal. Yorke said that the final version of "All I Need" was a combination of four different recordings.

== Composition ==
"All I Need" is a sombre song with lyrics detailing obsession and love. It incorporates strings, synthesisers, glockenspiel, and piano. Brian Howe of Paste wrote that it "contrasts baggy bass bleats with tiny, concise glockenspiel". Robert Sandall of The Telegraph described it as Yorke's most "direct love song", and Rolling Stone cited it as among "the most intense love songs [he] has ever sung". The lyrics incorporate metaphors describing unrequited love, with Yorke describing himself as "an animal trapped in your hot car". In the final crescendo, the album's "most cathartic release", Yorke sings "it's all right, it's all wrong" as Philip Selway's crash cymbals enter.

== Release ==
"All I Need" concludes the first half of In Rainbows. On 5 January 2009, TBD Records and ATO Records released "All I Need" to US adult album alternative radio. CD copies of the single were distributed by TBD Records for promotional purposes to coincide with the radio release, which included labels detailing Radiohead's nominations at the 51st Annual Grammy Awards. A performance of "All I Need" was included on the 2008 live video In Rainbows – From the Basement. Yorke remixed "All I Need" as a new song, "Honey Pot", which he played during a guest appearance on the radio station KCRW in June 2013.

== Music video ==
The "All I Need" music video was directed by Steve Rogers and filmed in Australia by John Seale. It premiered on MTV on May 1, 2008. In split screen, it depicts a day in the lives of two children: a boy in the west from an affluent area, and a boy in the east forced to work in a sweatshop which produces shoes worn by the western boy. It was made in support of the MTV EXIT campaign, which promotes awareness and increase prevention of human trafficking and modern slavery. Yorke said he hoped the campaign would make slavery less of a taboo to discuss. The video won 16 awards, including the UNICEF–CASBAA Asia-Pacific Child Rights Award, the Bronze ANDY for Film at the International Andy Awards, the In Book for Music Video at the 2009 D&AD Awards, and the Bronze Lion for Film at the Cannes Lions International Festival of Creativity.

== Personnel ==
Credits adapted from the In Rainbows liner notes.

Radiohead

- Thom Yorke
- Jonny Greenwood
- Colin Greenwood
- Ed O'Brien
- Philip Selway

Additional personnel

- Nigel Godrich – production, mixing, engineering
- Dan Grech-Marguerat – engineering
- Bob Ludwig – mastering
- The Millennia Ensemble – strings
- Hugo Nicolson – engineering
- Graeme Stewart – preproduction
- Richard Woodcraft – engineering

== Certifications ==
| Region | Certification | Certified units/sales |
|---|---|---|
| Canada (Music Canada) | Gold | 40,000^{‡} |
| New Zealand (RMNZ) | Gold | 15,000^{‡} |
^{‡} Sales+streaming figures based on certification alone.
