= 15 Step =

Song by Radiohead

from the album In Rainbows
- Released: October 10, 2007
- Length: 3:57
- Label: XL; TBD
- Songwriter: Radiohead
- Producer: Nigel Godrich

Music video
- "15 Step" on YouTube

"15 Step" is a song by the English alternative rock band Radiohead, released as the opening track on their seventh studio album, In Rainbows (2007). Produced by Nigel Godrich, the song was written in 2005 during a "mad rhythm experiment". The song received acclaim from music critics, who praised its blend of electronic and rock elements.

The animated music video for "15 Step" by Hideyuki Kota was released in 2008, after its storyboard won a contest sponsored by the band.

== Background ==
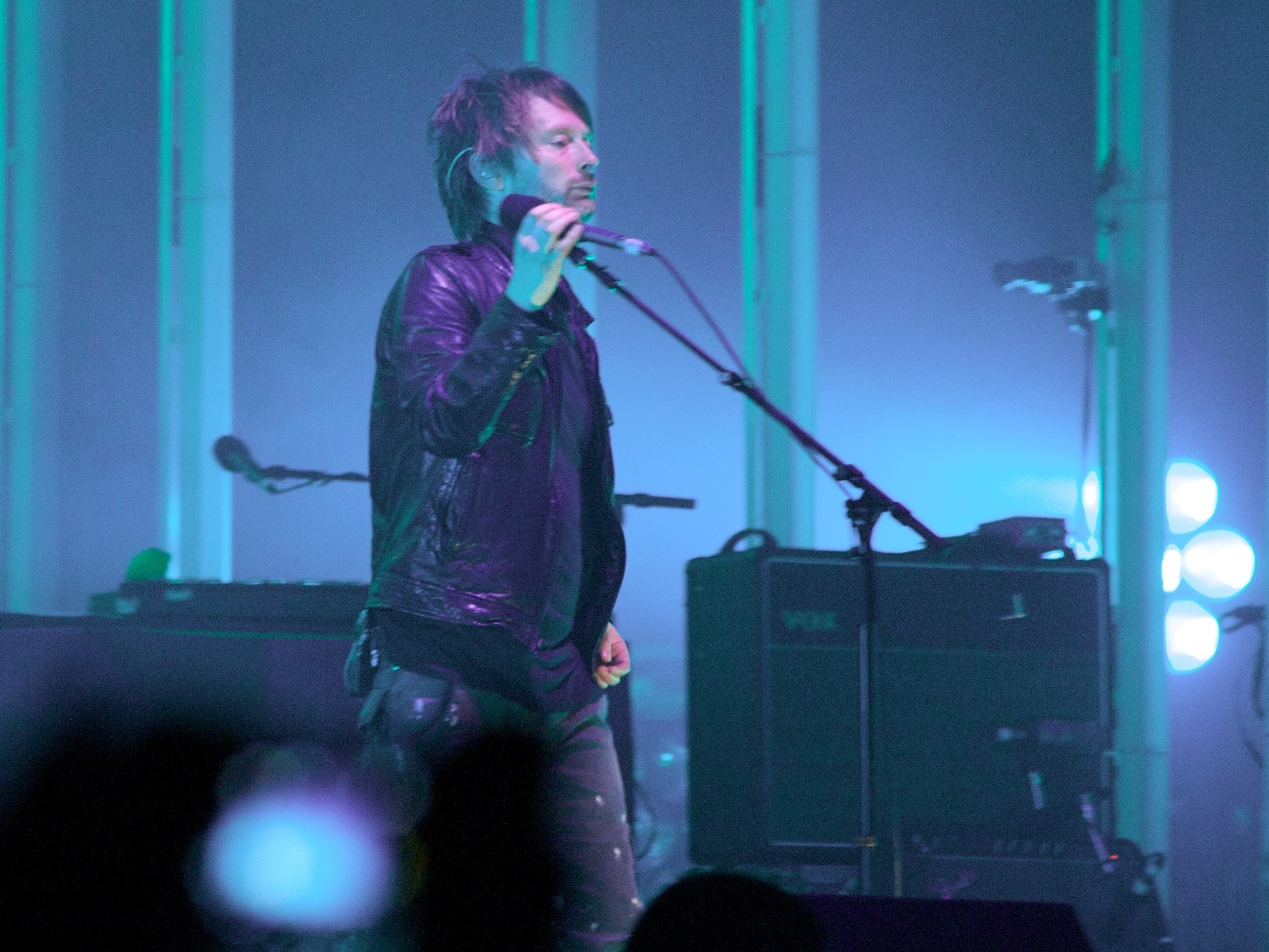
Thom Yorke performing "15 Step" in 2009 in São Paulo, Brazil

"15 Step" was developed in 2005, when Radiohead was experimenting with odd rhythms. The singer, Thom Yorke, arranged the song on his laptop, inspired by the "clapping groove" of "Fuck the Pain Away" (2000) by Peaches.

On March 8, 2006, Radiohead teased the song ahead of their tour later that year through a picture posted to their blog. During the tour, "15 Step" was debuted in their first performance at Copenhagen, and was played in all 28 of the subsequent 2006 stops.

== Lyrics and composition ==
"15 Step" features syncopated drumming and a "smooth" guitar line. The song is written in 5/4 time, with a "stuttering" pattern played on a drum machine. "15 Step" begins with a 40-second "mulched-up" drum introduction reminiscent of songs on Kid A, before a "blissful" guitar line and a bass line reminiscent of "Airbag" on OK Computer enter. This bass and guitar line "reveals" that the song is in the Dorian mode, until it changes to natural minor at the 1:38 mark.

Lyrically, "15 Step" speaks of disillusionment and deception, delivered by Yorke's "tuneful" falsetto. The lyric "15 steps, then a sheer drop" is thought to be a reference to being hung at a gallows. The dark lyrics are subverted by the sound of cheering children, recorded by Godrich and the bassist, Colin Greenwood, at Matrix Arts Centre in Oxfordshire.

== Music video ==
In March 2008, TBD Records partnered with Aniboom to host a music video-creation contest, whereby people could submit a storyboard set to a song from In Rainbows for the chance to produce a full-length video. Radiohead selected a storyboard set to "15 Step" produced by Hideyuki Kota (credited as Kota Totori) as one of four winners, and an adapted music video was subsequently released to Radiohead's YouTube channel on December 2, 2008.

== Reception ==
"15 Step" received positive reviews. Jason Lipshutz of Billboard included it in his list of the 15 most essential Radiohead songs, noting how it was "one of their more successful marriages of electronic and rock music". Sal Cinquemani of Slant Magazine similarly noted how the blended electronic and rock elements of "15 Step" made the song "one of the band's best hybrids". In 2017, Consequence named "15 Step" the band's 22nd-greatest song, writing that it "wastes no time winning listeners over". In 2019, Vulture named it the 44th-greatest.

"15 Step" has been called one of the most positive Radiohead songs. A review for the BBC called the song "astoundingly uplifting", while Sasha Frere-Jones of The New Yorker noted how Yorke would "dance across the stage in a happy jig" while performing "15 Step" live. A 2017 data analysis study conducted by Charles Thompson concluded that "15 Step" was the happiest Radiohead song.

== Live performances ==
Radiohead performed a "rousing" rendition of "15 Step" at the 2009 Grammy Awards, accompanied by 36 members of the USC Trojan Marching Band. The performance was identified as one of the highlights of the show, with Whitney Pastorek of Entertainment Weekly saying that it took an "already good song and turn[ed] it into a jubilant, slightly menacing masterpiece". The performance has been called one of the greatest Grammy performances of all time.

A performance of "15 Step" was included in the 2008 video album In Rainbows – From the Basement. "15 Step" also appeared in the 2008 film Twilight at the end credits.

== Credits and personnel ==
Radiohead

- Colin Greenwood
- Jonny Greenwood
- Ed O'Brien
- Philip Selway
- Thom Yorke

Additional personnel

- Nigel Godrich – producer, mixing engineer
- Dan Grech-Marguerat – engineering
- Hugo Nicolson – engineer
- Richard Woodcraft – engineer
- Graeme Stewart – engineer
- Bob Ludwig – mastering engineer
- Matrix Music School children's choir – choir (uncredited)

== Certifications ==
Region	Certification	Certified units/sales
Canada (Music Canada)	Gold	40,000^{‡}
^{‡} Sales+streaming figures based on certification alone.
