= Jigsaw Falling into Place =

2008 single by Radiohead

Single by Radiohead

from the album In Rainbows
- B-side: "Videotape" (Live); "Down Is the New Up" (Live); "Last Flowers" (Live)
- Released: 14 January 2008
- Recorded: 2005–2007
- Genre: Alternative rock; art rock; pop rock
- Length: 4:09
- Label: XL; TBD
- Songwriters: Colin Greenwood; Jonny Greenwood; Ed O'Brien; Philip Selway; Thom Yorke
- Producer: Nigel Godrich

Radiohead singles chronology
"2 + 2 = 5" (2003)	"Jigsaw Falling into Place" (2008)	"Nude" (2008)

Music video
- "Jigsaw Falling into Place" on YouTube

"Jigsaw Falling into Place" is a song by the English rock band Radiohead, produced by Nigel Godrich. It was released as the first single from Radiohead's seventh studio album, In Rainbows (2007), on 14 January 2008. It reached #30 in the UK singles chart.

The music video, directed by Garth Jennings and Adam Buxton, features Radiohead performing in their studio with cameras attached to bicycle helmets. Along with the 2000 Radiohead song "Everything in Its Right Place", "Jigsaw Falling into Place" inspired the 2012 composition Radio Rewrite by Steve Reich.

== Writing ==
Radiohead performed an early version of "Jigsaw Falling into Place" on their 2006 tour, with the working title "Open Pick". Mike Diver of Drowned in Sound described it as a "bass-propelled pop-rock head-bobber".

The lyrics were inspired by the chaos witnessed by the singer, Thom Yorke, when drinking in Oxford. He said: "The lyrics are quite caustic—the idea of 'before you're comatose' or whatever, drinking yourself into oblivion and getting fucked-up to forget ... [There] is partly this elation. But there's a much darker side."

== Music video ==
The music video was directed by Garth Jennings and Adam Buxton. Recorded in two takes, it features the band members performing in their studio with footage shot from cameras attached to bicycle helmets.

The American singer David Byrne, who was visiting Radiohead's studio, watched an early edit and assumed the helmets would be cut from the video. However, Buxton felt it was important that the "ridiculous" helmets were visible. He said later: "For me, that was the point. It's funny ... [Radiohead] completely got what was good about the idea. They committed to it and they performed it brilliantly. And Thom was mesmerising and each member of the band was just giving it." Though Buxton said it was one of the least popular Radiohead videos, he considered it among his best work.

== Release ==
"Jigsaw Falling into Place" was released on 14 January 2008 on XL Records as the first single from Radiohead's seventh studio album, In Rainbows (2007). Yorke's performances of "Videotape", "Down is the New Up" and "Last Flowers" from the television series From the Basement were included as B-sides. The single reached #30 in the UK singles chart.

Along with the 2000 Radiohead song "Everything in Its Right Place", "Jigsaw Falling into Place" inspired the 2012 composition Radio Rewrite by Steve Reich. Reich described it as "a beautiful song" with "elaborate harmonic movement".

== Reception ==
Time named "Jigsaw Falling Into Place" the fifth-best song of 2007. The Time writer Josh Tyrangiel praised its "tightness" and rising intensity, which he likened to a three-act play. He described it as "a journey through flirtation, consummation and regret [that] gets about as close as you can to summing up a doomed relationship in four minutes". Drowned in Sound said "Jigsaw Falling Into Place" was "easy enough on the ear for indirect consumption ... but compositionally complex beneath a deceptively simple outer gloss for long-standing admirers to get sufficient kicks from". Clash wrote that it was a good song but "relatively unadventurous". In 2016, Rolling Stone readers voted "Jigsaw Falling Into Place" one of the best Radiohead songs released since the 1990s.

== Track listing ==
7"

1. "Jigsaw Falling into Place" – 4:09
2. "Videotape" (Live from the Basement) – 4:26

CD

1. "Jigsaw Falling into Place" – 4:09
2. "Down Is the New Up" (Live from the Basement) – 5:07
3. "Last Flowers" (Live from the Basement) – 4:11

== Personnel ==
Radiohead

- Colin Greenwood
- Jonny Greenwood
- Ed O'Brien
- Philip Selway
- Thom Yorke

Additional musicians

- The Millennia Ensemble – strings
  - Everton Nelson – leading
  - Sally Herbert – conducting

Additional personnel

- Stanley Donwood – cover art
- Nigel Godrich – production, mixing, engineering
- Dan Grech-Marguerat – engineering
- Bob Ludwig – mastering
- Hugo Nicolson – engineering
- Graeme Stewart – preproduction
- Richard Woodcraft – engineering

== Charts ==
Chart (2008)	Peak position
France (SNEP)	55
UK Singles (OCC)	30

== Certifications ==
Region	Certification	Certified units/sales
New Zealand (RMNZ)	Platinum	30,000^{‡}
United Kingdom (BPI)	Gold	400,000^{‡}
^{‡} Sales+streaming figures based on certification alone.
