= In Rainbows =

2007 studio album by Radiohead

Studio album by Radiohead
- Released: 10 October 2007
- Recorded: February 2005 – June 2007
- Studios: Halswell House, Somerset; Tottenham House, Wiltshire; The Hospital Club, London; Radiohead's studio, Oxfordshire
- Genres: Alternative rock; art rock; experimental rock; art pop; electronica
- Length: 42:39
- Labels: Self-released; XL; TBD (North America)
- Producer: Nigel Godrich

Radiohead chronology
Com Lag (2plus2isfive) (2004)	In Rainbows (2007)	Radiohead Box Set (2007)

Singles from In Rainbows
- 1. "Jigsaw Falling into Place" Released: 14 January 2008; 2. "Nude" Released: 31 March 2008

In Rainbows is the seventh studio album by the English rock band Radiohead. It was self-released on 10 October 2007 as a download, followed by a retail release internationally through XL Recordings on 3 December 2007 and in North America through TBD Records on 1 January 2008. It was Radiohead's first release after their recording contract with EMI ended with their album Hail to the Thief (2003).

Work on In Rainbows began in early 2005. In 2006, after their sessions with the producer Spike Stent proved fruitless, Radiohead re-enlisted their longtime producer, Nigel Godrich. They recorded in the country houses Halswell House and Tottenham House, the Hospital Club in London, and their studio in Oxfordshire. The lyrics are less political and more personal than those of previous Radiohead albums.

Radiohead released In Rainbows on their website without prior publicity and allowed fans to set their own price, saying this liberated them from conventional promotional formats and removed barriers to audiences. It was the first such release by a major act and drew international media attention. Many praised Radiohead for challenging old models and finding new ways to connect with fans, while others felt it set a dangerous precedent at the expense of less successful artists.

In Rainbows was promoted with the singles "Jigsaw Falling into Place" and "Nude", along with webcasts, music videos, competitions, a worldwide tour and the live video In Rainbows — From the Basement (2008). The retail release topped the UK Albums Chart and the US Billboard 200, and by October 2008 it had sold more than three million copies worldwide. It was the best-selling vinyl record of 2008 and is certified platinum in the UK and Canada and gold in the US, Belgium and Japan. At the 51st Grammy Awards, In Rainbows won for Best Alternative Music Album and Best Boxed or Special Limited Edition Package and was nominated for Album of the Year, while "House of Cards" was nominated for Best Rock Performance by a Duo or Group with Vocal and Best Rock Song. In Rainbows was named one of the best albums of the year and the decade by various publications, and Rolling Stone included it in its list of the 500 Greatest Albums of All Time.

== Background ==
In 2004, after finishing the world tour for their sixth studio album, Hail to the Thief (2003), Radiohead went on hiatus. As Hail to the Thief was the final album released under their record contract with EMI, they had no contractual obligation to release new material. The drummer, Philip Selway, said Radiohead still wanted to create music, but took a break to focus on other areas of their lives, and that the end of their contract provided a natural point to pause and reflect. The New York Times described Radiohead as "by far the world's most popular unsigned band".

In 2005, the singer and songwriter, Thom Yorke, appeared on the web series From the Basement, performing the future In Rainbows tracks "Videotape", "Down is the New Up" and "Last Flowers". He released his first solo album, The Eraser, in 2006. The lead guitarist, Jonny Greenwood, released his first solo works, the film soundtracks Bodysong (2003) and There Will Be Blood (2007).

== Recording ==
In March 2005, Radiohead began writing and recording at their studio in Oxfordshire. They initially chose to work without their longtime producer, Nigel Godrich. According to the guitarist Ed O'Brien, "We were a little bit in the comfort zone ... We've been working together for 10 years, and we all love one another too much." The bassist, Colin Greenwood, later denied this, saying Godrich had been busy working with Charlotte Gainsbourg and Beck. At the Ether festival in July 2005, Jonny Greenwood and Yorke performed a version of the future In Rainbows track "Weird Fishes / Arpeggi" with the London Sinfonietta orchestra and the Arab Orchestra of Nazareth.

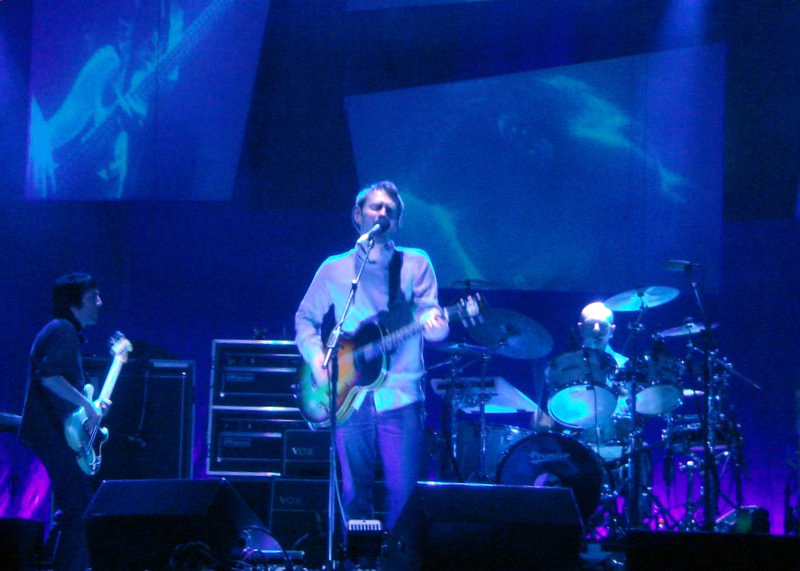
Radiohead at the Greek Theatre, Berkeley, California, in 2006. Radiohead used their 2006 tour to develop songs for In Rainbows.

Regular recording sessions began that August, with Radiohead updating fans on their progress intermittently on their new blog, Dead Air Space. The sessions were slow, and the band struggled to regain confidence. According to Yorke, "We spent a long time in the studio just not going anywhere, wasting our time, and that was really, really frustrating." They attributed their slow progress to a lack of momentum after their break, the lack of deadline and producer, and the fact that all the members had become fathers.

In December 2005, Radiohead hired the producer Spike Stent, who had worked with artists including U2 and Björk, to help them work through their material. Stent listened to their self-produced work and agreed it was subpar. However, the collaboration with Stent was unsuccessful.

Concerned by the lack of progress, Radiohead's management suggested they break up. Brian Message, a partner at their management company, said later: "You have to be honest if it's not working. You have to have passion about what you do." O'Brien said Radiohead decided to continue because "when you got beyond all the shit and the bollocks, the core of these songs were really good". He felt In Rainbows could be the final Radiohead record, and was motivated by a desire to secure their legacy as a great band.

In an effort to break the deadlock, Radiohead decided to tour for the first time since 2004. They performed in Europe and North America in May and June 2006, and returned to Europe for several festivals in August, performing many new songs. According to Yorke, the tour forced them to finish writing the songs. He said: "Rather than it being a nightmare, it was really, really good fun, because suddenly everyone is being spontaneous and no one's self-conscious because you're not in the studio ... It felt like being 16 again."

=== Nigel Godrich sessions ===
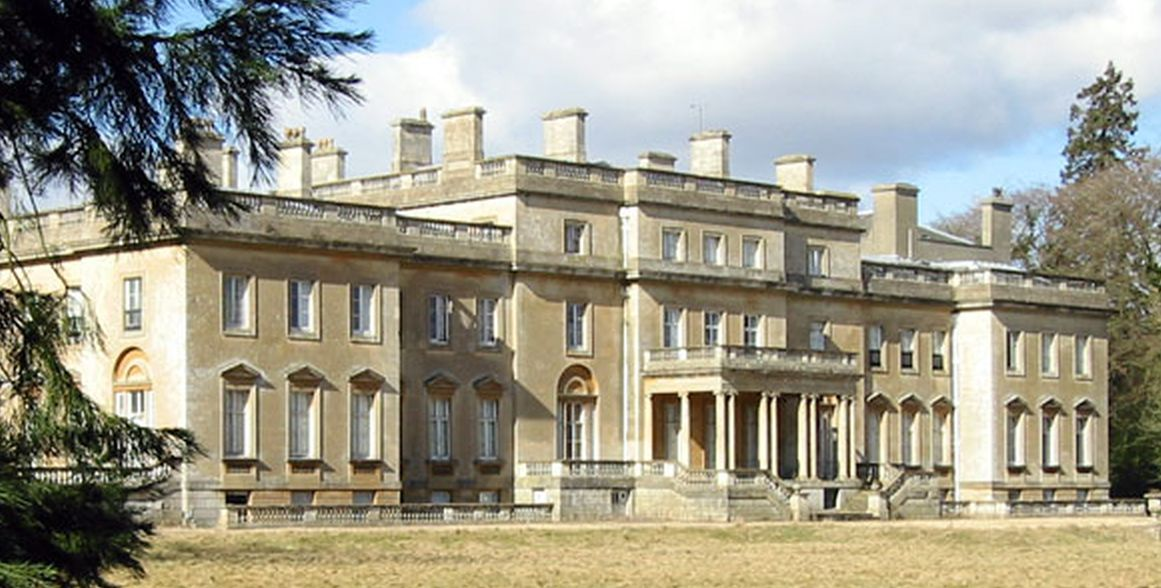
Tottenham House, Wiltshire

After the tour, Radiohead discarded the recordings made with Stent and re-enlisted Godrich. According to Yorke, Godrich gave them "a walloping kick up the arse". To focus them, Godrich transferred their rhythm tracks to a single track, where they could not be further altered. According to Colin, "The idea was to make us commit to something ... It was as if we were sampling ourselves. And when you mash sounds together like that they cross-pollinate, they marinade, they interact with each other... They have little sonic babies." Yorke said the band attempted to create "a sense of disembodiment" by using elements from different versions of songs. For example, "All I Need" was assembled from takes from four different versions.

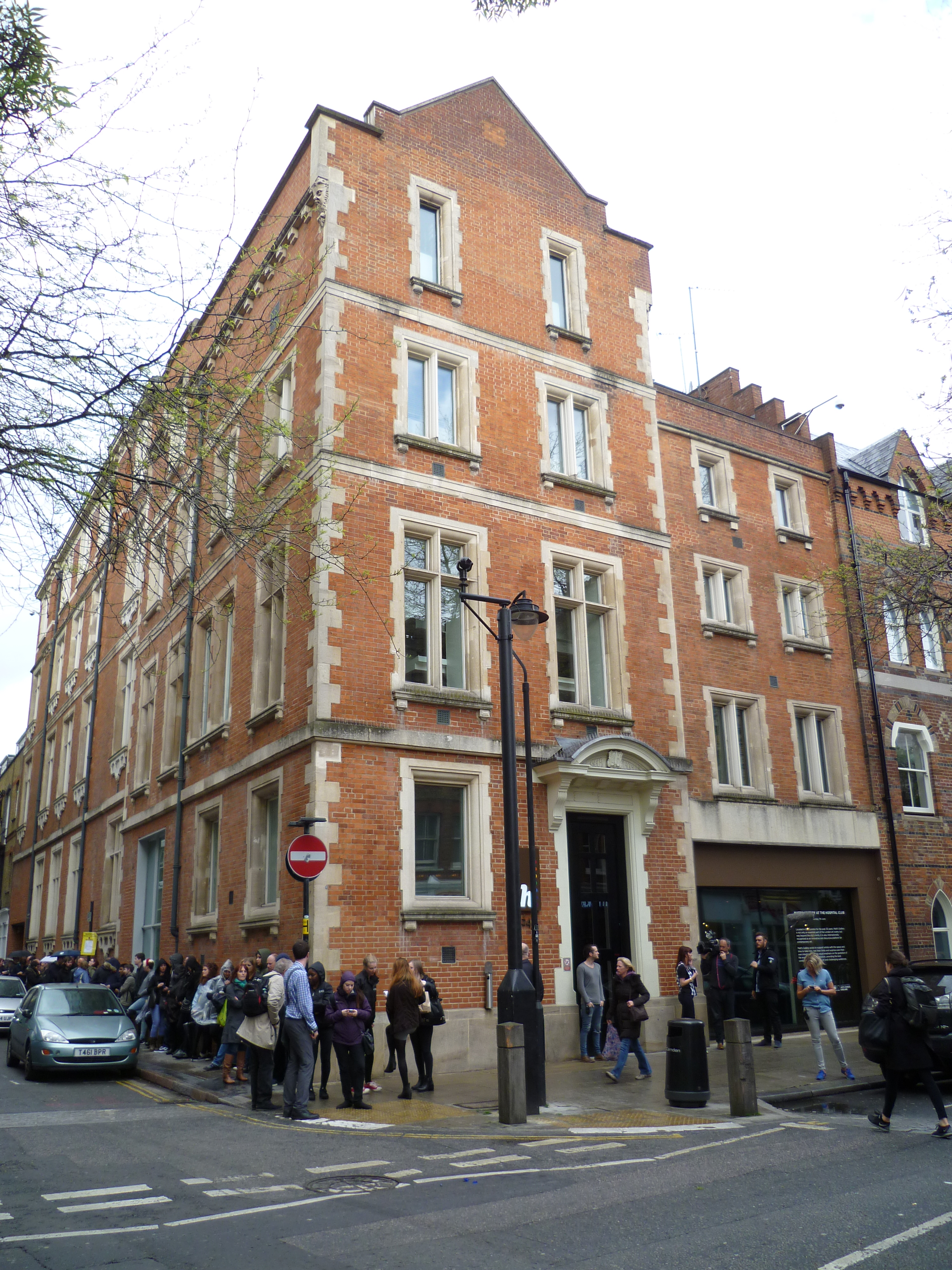
The Hospital Club, London

For three weeks in October 2006, Radiohead worked at Tottenham House in Marlborough, Wiltshire, a country house scouted by Godrich. The band members lived in caravans, as the building was in a state of disrepair. Yorke described it as "derelict in the stricter sense of the word, where there's holes in the floor, rain coming through the ceilings, half the window panes missing ... There were places you just basically didn't go. It definitely had an effect. It had some pretty strange vibes." The sessions were productive and the band recorded "Jigsaw Falling into Place" and "Bodysnatchers". Yorke wrote on Dead Air Space that Radiohead had "started the record properly now ... starting to get somewhere I think. Finally." Radiohead used several guitars borrowed from the guitarist Johnny Marr, including a 1957 Gibson Les Paul Gold Top and a 1964 Gibson SG. Colin contracted temporary hearing loss and tinnitus brought upon by faulty headphones.

In December 2006, sessions took place at Halswell House in Taunton, and Godrich's studio at the Hospital Club in Covent Garden, London, where Radiohead recorded "Videotape" and completed "Nude". In January, Radiohead resumed recording in their Oxfordshire studio and started to post photos, lyrics, videos and samples of new songs on Dead Air Space. In June, having finished recording, Godrich posted clips of songs on Dead Air Space.

Feeling Hail to the Thief was overlong, Radiohead wanted their next album to be concise. Yorke said: "I believe in the rock album as an artistic form of expression. In Rainbows is a conscious return to this form of 45-minute statement ... Our aim was to describe in 45 minutes, as coherently and conclusively as possible, what moves us." They settled on 10 songs, saving the rest for In Rainbows Disk 2, the bonus disc included in the limited edition. Yorke recorded "Last Flowers", included on the bonus disc, in the Eraser sessions. In Rainbows was mastered by Bob Ludwig in July 2007 at Gateway Mastering, New York City. Godrich said making In Rainbows had been an opportunity to "reconnect" for the band members, who had a "particular chemistry".

== Music ==
In Rainbows incorporates elements of art rock, experimental rock, alternative rock, art pop, and electronica. O'Brien said Radiohead were hesitant to create an "epic" record, which they felt had negative associations of stadium rock. However, he conceded that "epic is also about beauty, like a majestic view, and what we did on this record was to allow the songs to be epic when they have to be". He cited "Weird Fishes / Arpeggi" as an example of a song that was "obviously epic in scope". Yorke said Radiohead considered In Rainbows "our classic album, our Transformer, our Revolver, our Hunky Dory".

Yorke said that, unlike Hail to the Thief, there was "very little anger" in In Rainbows: "It's in no way political, or, at least, doesn't feel that way to me. It very much explores the ideas of transience. It starts in one place and ends somewhere completely different." In another interview, Yorke said the album was about mortality and the realisation that he could die at any moment. O'Brien described the lyrics as universal and about "being human", with no political agenda. The title In Rainbows was chosen because it was open-ended and not provocative or polarising, and reflected Donwood's artwork.

The opening track, "15 Step", features a quintuple meter and a handclap rhythm inspired by "Fuck the Pain Away" by Peaches. Radiohead recorded cheers by a group of children from the Matrix Arts Centre in Oxfordshire. "Bodysnatchers", which Yorke described as a combination of Wolfmother, Neu! and "dodgy hippy rock", was recorded when he was in a period of "hyperactive mania". The lyrics were inspired by Victorian ghost stories, the 1972 novel The Stepford Wives and Yorke's feeling of "your physical consciousness trapped without being able to connect fully with anything else". "Weird Fishes / Arpeggi" features phasing guitars influenced by the American composer Steve Reich.

On "All I Need", Jonny Greenwood wanted to capture the white noise generated by a band playing loudly in a room, which never occurs in the studio. His solution was to have a string section play every note of the scale, blanketing the frequencies. Radiohead recorded a version of "Nude" during the OK Computer sessions, but discarded it. This version featured a Hammond organ, a "straighter" feel, and different lyrics. For In Rainbows, Colin Greenwood wrote a new bassline, which Godrich said "transformed it from something very straight into something that had much more of a rhythmic flow". "Faust Arp" combines fingerpicked acoustic guitar and "syrupy" strings, which Pitchfork likened to the Beatles. The title tributes the krautrock band Faust.

Radiohead developed "Reckoner" while working on another song, "FeelingPulledApartByHorses". It features Yorke's falsetto, "frosty, clanging" percussion, a "meandering" guitar line, piano, and strings arranged by Jonny Greenwood. Yorke described it as "a love song... sort of". He said the lyric "because we separate like ripples on a blank shore" was the centre of In Rainbows, and that "everything's leading to that point and then going away from that point". He described "House of Cards" as "mellow and summery", and likened it to the 1968 instrumental "Albatross" by Fleetwood Mac. Mike Diver of Drowned in Sound described "Jigsaw Falling into Place" as a "bass-propelled pop-rock head-bobber". The lyrics were inspired by the chaos witnessed by Yorke when drinking in Oxford, a combination of elation and "a much darker side".

Yorke said composing "Videotape" was "absolute agony", and that it "went through every possible parameter". He initially wanted it to be a "post-rave trance track", similar to the music of Surgeon. Radiohead performed "Videotape" in a more conventional rock arrangement on tour in 2006, with Selway's drums building to a climax. For the album, Godrich and Greenwood reduced the song to a minimal piano ballad with percussion from a Roland TR-909 drum machine. According to Yorke, Greenwood was "obsessed" with shifting the start of the bar; the syncopation throws off the listener's perception of the downbeat.

== Artwork ==
The In Rainbows artwork was designed by Radiohead's longtime collaborator Stanley Donwood. Donwood worked in the studio while Radiohead worked on the album, allowing the artwork to convey the mood of the music. He displayed images in the studio and on the studio computer for the band to interact with and comment on. He also posted images daily on the Radiohead website, though none were used in the final artwork.

Donwood experimented with photographic etching, putting prints into acid baths and throwing wax at paper, creating images influenced by NASA space photography. He originally planned to explore suburban life, but realised it did not fit the album, saying: "The music took a different direction and became much more organic, sensual and sexual, so I started working with wax and syringes." He described the final artwork as "very colourful ... It's a rainbow but it is very toxic, it's more like the sort of one you'd see in a puddle." Radiohead did not reveal the cover until the retail release. The limited edition includes a booklet containing additional artwork by Donwood.

== Release ==
In the weeks preceding the album announcement, Radiohead posted a series of coded messages on their website. When decoded, they revealed messages including lyrics from "Bodysnatchers". On 1 October 2007, Jonny Greenwood announced In Rainbows on Radiohead's blog: "Well, the new album is finished, and it's coming out in 10 days; we've called it In Rainbows." The post contained a link to pre-order a download of the album for any amount, including £0.

The release was a landmark use of the pay-what-you-want model for music sales. It was suggested by Radiohead's managers, Bryce Edge and Chris Hufford, in April 2007. According to Selway, "Because [In Rainbows] was taking quite long, our management were twiddling thumbs at points and they were just coming up with ideas. And this was one that really stuck." Brian Message, a partner at their management company, said they had determined it would cost less than US$0.03 per copy to distribute In Rainbows digitally and that it would reach 173 countries.

Colin Greenwood explained the release as a way of avoiding the "regulated playlists" and "straitened formats" of radio and TV, ensuring listeners around the world would experience the music at the same time and preventing leaks in advance of a physical release. He said the decision had not been made for financial gain, and that if money had been Radiohead's motivation they would have accepted an offer from Universal Records.

=== Formats and distribution ===
For the In Rainbows download, Radiohead employed the network provider PacketExchange to bypass public internet servers, using a less-trafficked private network. The download was packaged as a ZIP file containing the ten tracks encoded in a 160 kbit/s DRM-free MP3 format. The staggered online release began at about 5:30am GMT on 10 October 2007. The download was removed on 10 December.

Radiohead also sold a limited "discbox" edition from their website. It contained the album on CD and two 12" heavyweight 45 rpm vinyl records with artwork and lyric booklets, plus In Rainbows Disk 2, a CD with eight additional tracks, digital photos and artwork, packaged in a hardcover book and slipcase. The limited edition was shipped from December 2007. In June 2009, Radiohead made Disk 2 available for download on their website for £6.

Radiohead ruled out an internet-only distribution, saying that 80% of people still bought physical releases and that it was important to have an "artefact" or "object". For the retail release, Radiohead retained ownership of the recordings and compositions but licensed the music to record labels. Licensing agreements were managed by Radiohead's publisher, Warner Chappell Music Publishing. Radiohead formed a limited liability company, Xurbia Xendless Ltd, to deal with the income, a practice they repeated for later releases.

In Rainbows was released on CD and vinyl in Japan by BMG on 26 December 2007, in Australia on 29 December 2007 by Remote Control Records, in the US by TBD Records, and in Canada by MapleMusic and Fontana on 1 January 2008. Elsewhere, it was released on 31 December 2007 by the independent record label XL Recordings, which had released Yorke's album The Eraser. The CD release came in a cardboard package containing the CD, lyric booklet, and stickers that could be placed on the blank jewel case to create cover art. Phil Costello, the head of TBD, said that including bonus songs on the CD release would have boosted initial sales, but did not suit Radiohead's long-term strategy. In Rainbows was the first Radiohead album available for download in several digital music stores, such as the iTunes Store and Amazon MP3. On 10 June 2016, it was added to the streaming service Spotify.

=== Response ===
The pay-what-you-want release, the first for a major musical act, attracted international media attention and sparked debate about the implications for the music industry. According to Mojo, it was "hailed as a revolution in the way major bands sell their music", and the media's reaction was "almost overwhelmingly positive". Time called it "easily the most important release in the recent history of the music business". Jon Pareles of The New York Times wrote that "for the beleaguered recording business Radiohead has put in motion the most audacious experiment in years". NME wrote that "the music world seemed to judder several rimes off its axis", and praised the fact that everyone, from fans to critics, had access to the album at the same time, calling it an unusual "moment of togetherness".

The U2 singer, Bono, praised Radiohead as "courageous and imaginative in trying to figure out some new relationship with their audience". The rapper Jay-Z described the release as "genius", and the singer Courtney Love wrote on her blog: "The kamikaze pilot in me wants to do the same damn thing. I'm grateful for Radiohead for making the first move." In the 2010s, Gigwise and DIY credited In Rainbows as the first "surprise album" — a major album released without prior publicity — ahead of acts such as Beyoncé and U2.

The release also drew criticism. Trent Reznor of Nine Inch Nails thought it did not go far enough, and accused Radiohead of using a compressed digital release as a bait-and-switch to promote a traditional record sale. Reznor released his sixth album, Ghosts I–IV, under a Creative Commons licence the following year. The singer Lily Allen said the release was "arrogant" and sent a bad message to less successful acts, saying: "You don't choose how to pay for eggs. Why should it be different for music?" The Sonic Youth bassist, Kim Gordon, said the release "seemed really community-oriented, but it wasn't catered towards [Radiohead's] musician brothers and sisters, who don't sell as many records. It makes everyone else look bad for not offering their music for whatever." The Guardian journalist Will Hodgkinson argued that Radiohead had made it impossible for less successful musicians to make a living from their music.

Responding to criticisms, Jonny Greenwood said Radiohead were responding to the culture of downloading free music, which he likened to the legend of King Canute: "You can't pretend the flood isn't happening." Colin said the criticism was "worrying about all these ancillary questions and forgetting about the primal urge of people to share and enjoy music. And there's always going to be a way of finding money or livings to be made out of it." Yorke told the BBC: "We have a moral justification in what we did in the sense that the majors and the big infrastructure of the music business has not addressed the way artists communicate directly with their fans ... Not only do they get in the way, but they take all the cash."

Radiohead's management defended the release as "a solution for Radiohead, not the industry", and doubted it would the same way for Radiohead again. Radiohead have not used the pay-what-you-want system for subsequent releases. In 2009, Message said he believed that peer-to-peer file sharing should be legal, and advocated for government intervention to force internet service providers to pay artists.

In February 2013, Yorke told the Guardian that though Radiohead had hoped to subvert the corporate music industry with In Rainbows, he feared they had instead played into the hands of content providers such as Apple and Google: "They have to keep commodifying things to keep the share price up, but in doing so they have made all content, including music and newspapers, worthless, in order to make their billions. And this is what we want?"

=== Piracy ===
In Rainbows was released when CD sales were falling due to internet piracy. An unidentified executive at a major European label told Time: "This feels like yet another death knell. If the best band in the world doesn't want a part of us, I'm not sure what's left for this business." According to the media measurement company BigChampagne, on the day of release, around 400,000 copies of In Rainbows were pirated via torrent. By 3 November, it had been shared 2.3 million times. Some listeners were driven to piracy after the official website overloaded.

U2's manager, Paul McGuinness, said Radiohead's strategy had failed as 60 to 70 percent of Radiohead fans had pirated In Rainbows. However, BigChampagne concluded that the music industry should not think of piracy as lost sales, as Radiohead had shown that even releasing music free had not deterred it. Based on this report, Wired concluded that "by 'losing' the battle for the email addresses of those who downloaded their album via bit torrent, [Radiohead] actually won the overall war for the public's attention – no easy feat, these days". In an article for the album's tenth anniversary, NME argued that Radiohead had demonstrated that the best response to piracy was to explore alternative ways to connect with fans, offering content at different price points: "The pay-what-you-want aspect isn't something to be followed slavishly ... It's the willingness to try it and the connection with fans that made it successful that should be an inspiration."

=== Dispute with EMI ===
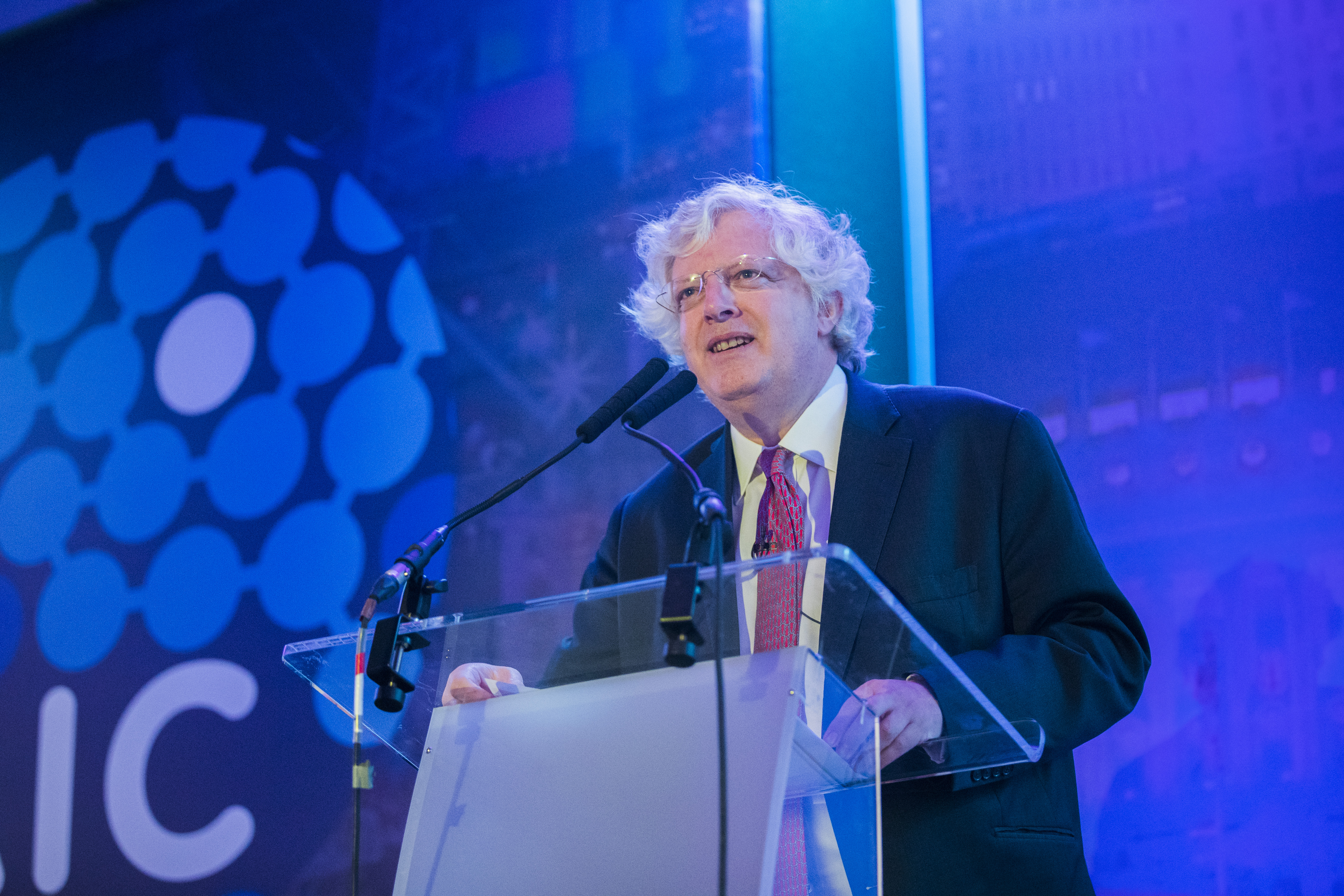
The EMI owner, Guy Hands (pictured in 2019), clashed with Radiohead in public statements.

As Radiohead's recording contract with EMI ended in 2003, Radiohead recorded In Rainbows without a record label. Shortly before work began, Yorke told Time: "I like the people at our record company, but the time is at hand when you have to ask why anyone needs one. And, yes, it probably would give us some perverse pleasure to say 'fuck you' to this decaying business model."

In August 2007, as Radiohead were finishing In Rainbows, EMI was acquired by the private equity firm Terra Firma for US$6.4 billion (£4.7 billion), with Guy Hands as the new chief executive. Executives including Keith Wozencroft, who had signed Radiohead to EMI, travelled regularly to Radiohead's studio in hopes of negotiating a new contract. They were "devastated" when Radiohead told them they would not be signing. O'Brien later said he had not realised Radiohead's importance to EMI: "That probably sounds really naive. But there weren't people going, 'You're so important.' We were just one of the bands on their roster." According to Eamonn Forde, the author of The Final Days of EMI, Radiohead had lost faith in EMI and thought the new ownership would be a "bloodbath". O'Brien said Radiohead had believed a deal with EMI was possible, and that "it was really sad to leave all the people [we'd worked with] ... But Terra Firma don't understand the music industry."

Hands believed that Radiohead would only have cancelled their self-release plan with a "really big" offer, and an EMI spokesperson said that Radiohead had demanded "an extraordinary amount of money". Yorke and Radiohead's management released statements denying this, and said that they had instead wanted control over their back catalogue, which Hands had refused. Radiohead's co-manager, Bryce Edge, said Radiohead had the moral rights to the albums. According to Hands, Radiohead wanted a large payment in addition to ownership of their back catalogue, which EMI "valued even more". He estimated that they had wanted "millions and millions". Responding to Hands's statement, Yorke told an interviewer: "It fucking pissed me off. We could have taken them to court. The idea that we were after so much money was stretching the truth to breaking point. That was his PR company briefing against us and I'll tell you what, it fucking ruined my Christmas."

Days after Radiohead signed to XL, EMI announced a box set of Radiohead albums recorded before In Rainbows, released in the same week as the In Rainbows special edition. Radiohead were reportedly angered by the release, and commentators including the Guardian saw it as retaliation for them choosing not to sign with EMI. Hands defended the reissues as necessary to boost EMI's revenues and said "we don't have a huge amount of reasons to be nice [to Radiohead]". The box set was promoted on Google Ads with an advert falsely claiming that In Rainbows was included. EMI removed it, citing a "data source glitch". A spokesperson for Radiohead said they accepted this was a genuine mistake.

== Promotion ==
=== Webcasts ===
Following the release of In Rainbows, Radiohead broadcast two webcasts from their Oxfordshire studio: Thumbs Down in November 2007 and Scotch Mist on New Year's Eve. In the US, Scotch Mist was also broadcast on Current TV. The webcasts featured performances of In Rainbows songs, covers of songs by New Order, the Smiths and Björk, poetry, and videos created with the comedian Adam Buxton and the filmmaker Garth Jennings. Colin Greenwood described the webcasts as spontaneous and liberating, bypassing the usual lengthy process of commissioning music videos. Scotch Mist was added to the BFI National Archive in May 2026.

=== Singles and music videos ===
The first single, "Jigsaw Falling into Place", was released in January 2008, followed by "Nude" on 31 March. Both songs were accompanied by music videos directed by Buxton and Jennings. Radiohead held remix competitions for "Nude" and "Reckoner", releasing the separated stems for purchase, and streamed the entries on their website. "Nude" debuted at number 37 on the Billboard Hot 100; boosted by sales of the stems, it was the first Radiohead song to enter the chart since "High and Dry" (1995) and Radiohead's first US top-40 song since their debut single, "Creep" (1992). "Reckoner" reached number 74 on the UK singles chart and number 21 on the Bubbling Under Hot 100 Singles chart, a 25-song extension of the Hot 100.

In March, Radiohead and the animation company Aniboom ran a competition asking entrants to submit concepts for animated music videos for In Rainbows. Semifinalists were chosen by TBD Records and the Cartoon Network programming block Adult Swim. Unable to choose only one winner, Radiohead awarded the full prize money of $10,000 each to four semifinalists, who created videos for "15 Step", "Weird Fishes", "Reckoner" and "Videotape". A video for "All I Need" premiered on MTV on 1 May, produced with MTV EXIT, an initiative to raise awareness of human trafficking and modern slavery. It depicts a day in the lives of two children: a boy in the west from an affluent area, and a boy in the east forced to work in a sweatshop which produces shoes worn by the western boy. In July, Radiohead released a video for "House of Cards", made with lidar technology instead of cameras.

=== Live performances ===
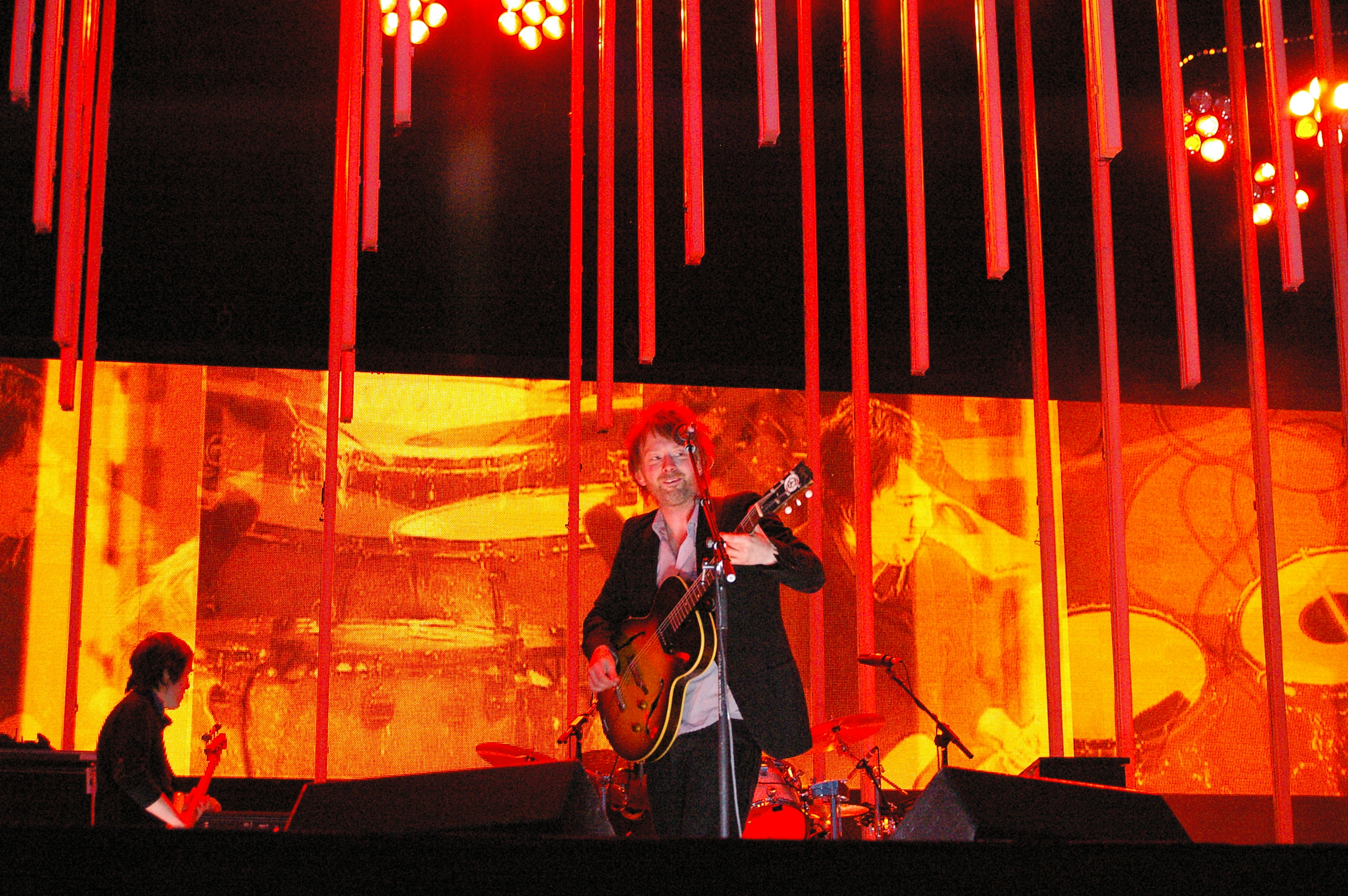
Radiohead at the 2008 Main Square Festival in Arras, France

On 16 January 2008, a surprise Radiohead performance at the London record shop Rough Trade East was relocated to a nearby club after police raised safety concerns. Radiohead toured North America, Europe, South America and Japan from May 2008 until March 2009. The opening acts were Bat for Lashes in Europe; Liars in the southern US and on the US west coast; Grizzly Bear on the US east coast; and Clinic, Low, Modeselektor and the Ensemble Nacionalde España de Música Contemporánea at the Daydream Festival in Barcelona.

To determine how they could reduce carbon emissions, Radiohead commissioned the environmental group Best Foot Forward. Based on the findings, Radiohead played in amphitheatres rather than smaller venues and focused on playing in city centres to reduce reliance on flights for attendees. They also used a carbon-neutral "forest" of LEDs on stage.

Radiohead recorded a live video, In Rainbows — From the Basement, broadcast on VH1 in May 2008. In February 2009, Yorke and Jonny Greenwood performed "15 Step" with the University of Southern California Marching Band at the 51st Annual Grammy Awards.

== Sales ==
=== Digital ===
In early October 2007, a Radiohead spokesperson reported that most downloaders paid "a normal retail price" for the digital version of In Rainbows, and that most fans had pre-ordered the limited edition. Citing a source close to the band, Gigwise reported that In Rainbows had sold 1.2 million digital copies before its retail release. This was dismissed by Radiohead's co-manager Bryce Edge as "exaggerated".

According to research released in November 2007 by the market research firm Comscore, downloaders paid an average of US$2.26 per download globally, and 62% of downloaders paid nothing. Of those who paid, the average paid was $6 globally, with 12% paying between $8 and $12, around the typical cost of an album on iTunes. Radiohead dismissed the report as "wholly inaccurate", but said the results had been good. Another survey, conducted by the industry organisation Record of the Day, found that 28.5% of those who downloaded the album paid nothing or £0.01 and the average price per download was £3.88. In December 2007, Yorke said that Radiohead had made more money from digital sales of In Rainbows than the digital sales of their previous albums combined.

In October 2008, one year after the release, Warner Chappell reported that although most people paid nothing for the download, prerelease sales for In Rainbows had been more profitable than the total sales of Hail to the Thief and that the limited edition had sold 100,000 copies. In 2009, Wired reported that Radiohead had made an "instantaneous" £3 million from the album. Pitchfork saw this as proof that, thanks to their fans, "Radiohead could release a record on the most secretive terms, basically for free, and still be wildly successful, even as industry profits continued to plummet."

=== Retail ===
Because inrainbows.com is not a chart-registered retailer, In Rainbows download and limited edition sales were not eligible for inclusion in the UK Albums Chart. In the week of its retail release, In Rainbows reached number one on the UK Albums Chart, with first-week sales of 44,602 copies. In the US, after some record stores broke street date agreements, it entered the Billboard 200 at number 156. In the first week of official release, it became the 10th independent album to reach number one on the Billboard 200, selling 122,000 copies. In October 2008, Warner Chappell reported that In Rainbows had sold three million copies worldwide since its retail release, including 1.75 million physical sales. It was the bestselling vinyl album of 2008.

== Critical reception ==
Professional ratings
Aggregate scores
Source	Rating
Metacritic	88/100
Review scores
Source	Rating
AllMusic	4.5/5 stars
The A.V. Club	A−
Entertainment Weekly	A
The Guardian	5/5 stars
Mojo	4/5 stars
Pitchfork	9.3/10
Q	5/5 stars
Rolling Stone	4.5/5 stars
Spin	4/5 stars
The Times	4/5 stars

On the review aggregate site Metacritic, In Rainbows has a rating of 88 out of 100 based on 42 reviews, indicating "universal acclaim". The Guardian critic Alexis Petridis said it was perhaps Radiohead's strongest collection of songs for a decade. He called it witty, romantic and life-affirming, which he described as "new emotional territories" for Radiohead. Billboard's Jonathan Cohen commended In Rainbows for not being overshadowed by its marketing hype. Andy Kellman of AllMusic wrote that it "will hopefully be remembered as Radiohead's most stimulating synthesis of accessible songs and abstract sounds, rather than their first pick-your-price download".

NME described In Rainbows as "Radiohead reconnecting with their human sides, realising you [can] embrace pop melodies and proper instruments while still sounding like paranoid androids ... This [is] otherworldly music, alright." Will Hermes, writing in Entertainment Weekly, called In Rainbows "the gentlest, prettiest Radiohead set yet" and stated that it "uses the full musical and emotional spectra to conjure breathtaking beauty". Rob Sheffield of Rolling Stone praised its "vividly collaborative sonic touches" and concluded: "No wasted moments, no weak tracks: just primo Radiohead."

Jon Dolan of Blender called In Rainbows "far more pensive and reflective" than Hail to the Thief, writing that it "formulates a lush, sensualised ideal out of vague, layered discomfort". Spin's Mikael Wood felt that it "succeeds because all of that cold, clinical lab work hasn't eliminated the warmth from their music", while Pitchfork's Mark Pytlik wrote it was a more "human" album that "represents the sound of Radiohead coming back to earth". Pitchfork allowed readers to enter their own review score, referencing the pay-what-you-want release. Robert Christgau, writing for MSN Music, gave In Rainbows a two-star honourable mention and wrote that it was "more jammy, less songy and less Yorkey, which is good". The Wire was more critical, finding "a sense here of a group magisterially marking time, shying away ... from any grand, rhetorical, countercultural purpose".

In 2009, the NASA astronaut Mike Massimino played a copy of In Rainbows in orbit. The 2011 edition of The Rolling Stone Album Guide described In Rainbows as Radiohead's "most expansive and seductive album, possibly their all-time high". In the 2020s, Selway and O'Brien named it their favourite Radiohead album. Selway said it combined "everything that we'd been learning over two decades, and it seemed to land in quite a concise way ... It feels like a band that have learned to play their instruments together but have been able to spend long enough doing that so the playing reaches a new level." In 2024, the Rolling Stone critic Andy Greene said In Rainbows had completed perhaps "one of the best 12-year runs in rock history, maybe even the very best one".

=== Accolades ===
In Rainbows was ranked among the best albums of 2007 by many music publications. It was ranked first by Billboard, Mojo and PopMatters, third by NME and The A.V. Club, fourth by Pitchfork and Q, and sixth by Rolling Stone and Spin. It was named one of the best albums of the decade by NME, Paste, Rolling Stone, the Guardian, and Newsweek.

In Rainbows was nominated for the short list of the 2008 Mercury Prize. It won the Grammy awards for Best Alternative Music Album and Best Boxed or Special Limited Edition Package at the 51st Annual Grammy Awards. It was also nominated for Album of the Year and Producer of the Year, Non-Classical (for Godrich), while "House of Cards" was nominated for Best Rock Performance by a Duo or Group with Vocal, Best Rock Song and Best Music Video.

In Rainbows was included in the updated 2014 edition of 1001 Albums You Must Hear Before You Die. Rolling Stone included it in its lists of the 500 Greatest Albums of All Time at number 336 in 2012 and number 387 in 2023. In 2019, the Guardian named In Rainbows the 11th-greatest album of the 21st century so far. In 2011, NME ranked "Reckoner" the 93rd-best track of the preceding 15 years, and Pitchfork named it the 254th-greatest song of the decade. In 2020, Rolling Stone named In Rainbows one of the 40 most groundbreaking albums for its pay-what-you-want release, influencing acts such as Beyoncé and U2. In 2021, Pitchfork readers voted it the fourth-greatest album of the previous 25 years, and in 2025 Paste named it the 167th-greatest album of the 21st century so far.

== Track listing ==
All tracks are written by Radiohead.

In Rainbows track listing
No.	Title	Length
1.	"15 Step"	3:58
2.	"Bodysnatchers"	4:02
3.	"Nude"	4:15
4.	"Weird Fishes / Arpeggi"	5:18
5.	"All I Need"	3:49
6.	"Faust Arp"	2:10
7.	"Reckoner"	4:50
8.	"House of Cards"	5:28
9.	"Jigsaw Falling into Place"	4:09
10.	"Videotape"	4:40
Total length:		42:39

== In Rainbows Disk 2 ==
In Rainbows Disk 2

EP by Radiohead
- Released: 3 December 2007
- Genres: Alternative rock; experimental rock
- Length: 26:49
- Label: Self-released

The special edition of In Rainbows included a second disc, In Rainbows Disk 2, which contains eight additional tracks. Yorke said Disk 2 contained some of Radiohead's best work, such as "Down Is the New Up", but that it did not fit the main album. In 2009, Radiohead made Disk 2 available to purchase as a download on their website. It was released on digital services in October 2016.

=== Music ===
Stereogum characterised Disk 2 as more downcast and "balladeering" than Disk 1, with less guitar and more piano. "MK 1", an instrumental, extends the chords of "Videotape". "Down Is the New Up" is an "ominous" piano anthem, with a "funky" falsetto, "shimmering atmospherics" and orchestral swells. "Go Slowly" is a tense, "ghostly" song with guitars, glockenspiel and synthesisers. "MK 2" is a synthesiser instrumental. "Up on the Ladder" features synthesisers and a "gnarled", "funk-ish" guitar riff. "Last Flowers" has "mournful" vocals, piano arpeggios and acoustic guitar. "Bangers and Mash" is an "uptempo freakout" with "choppy" guitar. "4 Minute Warning" is a "peaceful" song with a droning ambient introduction.

=== Reception ===
Professional ratings
Review scores
Source	Rating
Pitchfork	6.2/10
Rolling Stone	3.5/5 stars
Stereogum	Positive

In Pitchfork, Chris Dahlen wrote that "a lesser band might have crammed some bootlegs and demo takes in here, but when Radiohead put something on disc, they want it to count". However, he criticised Yorke's vocals: "The cynical/alienated rut into which he grinds himself has the persistence of a toothache ... Yorke sounds like neither a post-millennial prophet nor an uncanny empathist, so much as a crank." In Rolling Stone, David Fricke wrote that "if you bought the deluxe box edition of In Rainbows just for the session leftovers, you did not get your eighty dollars' worth", but conceded that the songs "deserve to be on record". Stereogum wrote that the most impressive thing about Disk 2 was "how effortless it all seems".

=== Track listing ===
All tracks are written by Radiohead.

In Rainbows Disk 2 track listing
No.	Title	Length
1.	"MK 1"	1:03
2.	"Down Is the New Up"	4:59
3.	"Go Slowly"	3:48
4.	"MK 2"	0:53
5.	"Last Flowers"	4:26
6.	"Up on the Ladder"	4:17
7.	"Bangers + Mash"	3:19
8.	"4 Minute Warning"	4:04
Total length:		26:49

== Personnel ==
Adapted from the In Rainbows liner notes.

=== Radiohead ===
- Thom Yorke
- Jonny Greenwood
- Ed O'Brien
- Colin Greenwood
- Philip Selway

=== Additional musicians ===
- Sally Herbert – conductor
- The Millennia Ensemble – strings
- Everton Nelson – leader

=== Other personnel ===
- Nigel Godrich – producer, mixing engineer, recording engineer
- Graeme Stewart – pre-production
- Richard Woodcraft, Hugo Nicolson, Dan Grech-Marguerat – recording engineer
- Bob Ludwig – mastering engineer
- Stanley Donwood, Dr Tchock – artwork

== Charts ==
=== Weekly charts ===
Weekly sales chart performance for In Rainbows
Chart (2007–2008)	Peak position
Australian Albums (ARIA)	2
Austrian Albums (Ö3 Austria)	12
Belgian Albums (Ultratop Flanders)	2
Belgian Albums (Ultratop Wallonia)	5
Canadian Albums (Billboard)	1
Danish Albums (Hitlisten)	7
Dutch Albums (Album Top 100)	7
Finnish Albums (Suomen virallinen lista)	2
French Albums (SNEP)	1
German Albums (Offizielle Top 100)	8
Irish Albums (IRMA)	1
Italian Albums (FIMI)	7
Japanese Albums (Oricon)	11
Mexican Albums (Top 100 Mexico)	50
New Zealand Albums (RMNZ)	2
Norwegian Albums (VG-lista)	6
Polish Albums (ZPAV)	7
Scottish Albums (Official Charts)	2
Spanish Albums (Promusicae)	19
Swedish Albums (Sverigetopplistan)	6
Swiss Albums (Schweizer Hitparade)	2
UK Albums (Official Charts)	1
US Billboard 200	1
US Top Alternative Albums (Billboard)	1
US Independent Albums (Billboard)	1
US Top Rock Albums (Billboard)	1

Chart (2024–2026)	Peak position
Croatian International Albums (HDU)	1
Hungarian Physical Albums (MAHASZ)	24
Icelandic Albums (Tónlistinn)	28
Lithuanian Albums (AGATA)	98
Portuguese Albums (AFP)	168
UK Albums (OCC)	98

=== Year-end charts ===
2007 annual sales chart performance for In Rainbows
Chart (2007)	Position
US Top Alternative Albums (Billboard)	14

2008 annual sales chart performance for In Rainbows
Chart (2008)	Position
Australian Albums (ARIA)	85
Belgian Albums (Ultratop Flanders)	20
Belgian Albums (Ultratop Wallonia)	55
Dutch Albums (Album Top 100)	61
French Albums (SNEP)	61
Italian Albums (FIMI)	50
Japanese Albums (Oricon)	87
Swiss Albums (Schweizer Hitparade)	79
UK Albums (OCC)	76
US Billboard 200	60
US Top Alternative Albums (Billboard)	14
US Independent Albums (Billboard)	4
US Top Rock Albums (Billboard)	19

2009 annual sales chart performance for In Rainbows
Chart (2009)	Position
US Independent Albums (Billboard)	33

2024 annual sales chart performance for In Rainbows
Chart (2024)	Position
Belgian Albums (Ultratop Flanders)	198

2025 annual sales chart performance for In Rainbows
Chart (2025)	Position
Belgian Albums (Ultratop Flanders)	87
Dutch Albums (Album Top 100)	79
Icelandic Albums (Tónlistinn)	47

== Certifications and sales ==
Certifications and sales for In Rainbows
Region	Certification	Certified units/sales
Australia (ARIA)	Gold	35,000^{^}
Belgium (BRMA)	Gold	15,000^{*}
Canada (Music Canada)	Platinum	100,000^{^}
Denmark (IFPI Danmark)	Gold	10,000^{‡}
Italy (FIMI) sales since 2009	Gold	25,000^{‡}
Japan (RIAJ)	Gold	100,000^{^}
New Zealand (RMNZ)	Platinum	15,000^{‡}
United Kingdom (BPI)	Platinum	300,000^{‡}
United States (RIAA)	Gold	500,000^{^} / 1,020,000
Summaries
Europe	—	500,000
Worldwide	—	3,000,000
^{*} Sales figures based on certification alone.^{^} Shipments figures based on certification alone.^{‡} Sales+streaming figures based on certification alone.
