= Bodysnatchers (song) =

2007 song by Radiohead

Promotional single by Radiohead

from the album In Rainbows
- B-side: "House of Cards"
- Released: 1 May 2008
- Recorded: 2005–2007
- Genre: Alternative rock
- Length: 4:02
- Label: XL; TBD
- Songwriters: Colin Greenwood; Jonny Greenwood; Ed O'Brien; Philip Selway; Thom Yorke
- Producer: Nigel Godrich

Licensed audio
- "Bodysnatchers" on YouTube

"Bodysnatchers" is a song by the English rock band Radiohead, from their seventh album, In Rainbows (2007). The lyrics were inspired by Victorian ghost stories and the 1972 novel The Stepford Wives.

In May 2008, "Bodysnatchers" was released with "House of Cards" as a promotional single in the UK. ATO Records serviced it to modern rock radio in the US. It reached number eight on the Billboard Hot Modern Rock Tracks chart, Radiohead's highest placement since "Creep" in 1993.

== Recording ==
The Radiohead singer, Thom Yorke, and the lead guitarist, Jonny Greenwood, debuted "Bodysnatchers" in May 2006 at their performance for the Big Ask at Koko in London. Radiohead recorded "Bodysnatchers" with their producer, Nigel Godrich, at Tottenham House, a dilapidated country house in Marlborough, Wiltshire. Yorke said the house's atmosphere influenced the recording. "Bodysnatchers" was the only song on In Rainbows recorded as a live take with the band members playing together.

== Composition ==
Yorke described "Bodysnatchers" as a combination of the German band Neu! and "dodgy hippy rock", likening it to the Australian band Wolfmother. He said it was inspired by Victorian ghost stories, the 1972 novel The Stepford Wives and the feeling of "your physical consciousness trapped without being able to connect fully with anything else".

== Release ==
"Bodysnatchers" was released on Radiohead's seventh album, In Rainbows (2007). In May 2008, it was released with "House of Cards" as a promotional single in the United Kingdom. ATO Records and its sister label, Side One Recordings, Radiohead's record label in America, serviced "Bodysnatchers" to American radio stations as a promotional single in late 2007.

"Bodysnatchers" achieved airplay on modern rock radio stations, and reached number eight on the Billboard Modern Rock Tracks chart in February 2008. It was Radiohead's highest Billboard placement since "Creep" reached number two in 1993. A performance of "Bodysnatchers" was included on the 2008 live video In Rainbows – From the Basement.

== Charts ==
Chart (2008)	Peak position
Canada Rock (Billboard)	22
Japan (Japan Hot 100)	34
US Modern Rock Tracks (Billboard)	8
