= IHeartRadio Music Awards =

American music awards show

iHeartRadio Music Awards
- Current: 2026 iHeartRadio Music Awards
- Official logo of the iHeartRadio Music Awards
- Awarded for: Performance in music platforms and radio airplay, recognizing artists and listeners
- Country: United States
- First award: May 1, 2014; 12 years ago
- Website: https://www.iheart.com/music-awards/

Television/radio coverage
- Network: NBC (2014–2015); TBS, TNT and TruTV (2016–2018); Fox (2019, 2021–present) iHeartRadio (2020)

The iHeartRadio Music Awards is an American music awards show that celebrates music heard throughout the year across iHeartMedia radio stations nationwide and on iHeartRadio, iHeartMedia's digital music platform. Founded by iHeartRadio in 2014, the event recognizes the most popular artists and music over the previous year. Winners are chosen per cumulative performance data, while the public is able to vote in several categories.

The inaugural event was held on May 1, 2014, at the Shrine Auditorium in Los Angeles. Its first two years were broadcast live on NBC; from 2016 to 2018, it was simulcast on TBS, TNT and TruTV. Since the 2019 iHeartRadio Music Awards, the ceremony has aired on Fox. The trophy is manufactured by the New York firm Society Awards.

Taylor Swift is the most awarded artist in the history of the iHeartRadio Music Awards, having won 41 awards between 2015 and 2026.

== Overview ==
The nominations are based on results from the iHeartRadio Chart. It includes listener feedback and performance data, according to airplay; digital streaming data from the iHeartRadio platform, including sales, social, online video data and tags from BigChampagne and Shazam. The iHeartRadio Countdown, the two-hour weekly program, highlights the top 20 contemporary hit radio songs in the iHeartRadio Chart. The latter is supplied and compiled by Mediabase. In addition, every public-voting category (nine in 2018), includes social hashtags as the primary voting mechanism.

== List of ceremonies ==
Year	Date	Venue	Host city	Host	Song of the Year winner	Broadcaster	Ref.
2014	May 1	Shrine Auditorium	Los Angeles	—N/a	"Stay" – Rihanna featuring Mikky Ekko	NBC	
2015	March 29	Shrine Auditorium	Los Angeles	Jamie Foxx	"Shake It Off" – Taylor Swift	NBC	
2016	April 3	The Forum	Inglewood	Jason Derulo	"Hello" – Adele	TBS; TNT; TruTV	
2017	March 5	The Forum	Inglewood	Ryan Seacrest	"Can't Stop the Feeling!" – Justin Timberlake	TBS; TNT; TruTV	
2018	March 11	The Forum	Inglewood	DJ Khaled & Hailey Baldwin	"Shape of You" – Ed Sheeran	TBS; TNT; TruTV	
2019	March 14	Microsoft Theater	Los Angeles	T-Pain	"The Middle" — Zedd, Maren Morris & Grey	Fox	
2020	September 4–7 (Note: Originally scheduled for March 29, but it was postponed due to the COVID-19 pandemic until the ceremony itself would be later cancelled on August 24.)	Virtual; various locations across the United States (Note: Originally to be held at Shrine Auditorium in Los Angeles, but was forfeited due to the COVID-19 pandemic.)		—N/a	"Truth Hurts" — Lizzo	Untelevised, but was broadcast exclusively via audio means through iHeartRadio CHR stations and the app	
2021	May 27	Dolby Theatre	Los Angeles	Usher	"Blinding Lights" – The Weeknd	Fox	
2022	March 22	Shrine Auditorium	Los Angeles	LL Cool J	"Levitating" – Dua Lipa	Fox	
2023	March 27	Dolby Theatre	Los Angeles	Lenny Kravitz	"Anti-Hero" – Taylor Swift	Fox	
2024	April 1	Dolby Theatre	Los Angeles	Ludacris	"Kill Bill" – SZA	Fox	
2025	March 17	Dolby Theatre	Los Angeles	LL Cool J	"Beautiful Things" – Benson Boone	Fox	
2026	March 26	Dolby Theatre	Los Angeles	Ludacris	“Ordinary” - Alex Warren	Fox	

== Award categories ==
The categories cover an array of genres, including pop, alternative rock, hip-hop, R&B, Latin and regional Mexican music. Public-voting categories through social media are indicated with a double dagger (‡).

=== Current award categories ===
- Song of the Year (2014–present)
- Artist of the Year (2014–2015, 2023–present)
- Best Collaboration (2014–present)
- Duo/Group of the Year (2016–2024, 2026–present)
- Pop Song of the Year (2025-present)
- Pop Artist of the Year (2024-present)
- Best New Pop Artist (2017–present)
- Alternative Rock Song of the Year (2014–present)
- Alternative Rock Artist of the Year (2016–present)
- Best New Rock/Alternative Rock Artist (2017–present)
- Rock Song of the Year (2016–present)
- Rock Artist of the Year (2016–present)
- Country Song of the Year (2014–present)
- Country Artist of the Year (2016–present)
- Best New Country Artist (2017–present)
- Dance Song of the Year (2015–present)
- Dance Artist of the Year (2016–present)
- Hip-Hop Song of the Year (2016–present)
- Hip-Hop Artist of the Year (2016–present)
- Best New Hip-Hop Artist (2017–present)
- R&B Song of the Year (2016–present)
- R&B Artist of the Year (2016–present)
- Best New R&B Artist (2017–present)
- Latin Pop/Urban Song of the Year (2016–present)
- Latin Pop/Urban Artist of the Year (2016–present)
- Best New Latin Pop/Urban Artist (2017–present)
- Regional Mexican Song of the Year (2016–present)
- Regional Mexican Artist of the Year (2016–present)
- Best New Regional Mexican Artist (2025-present)
- K-Pop Artist of the Year (2024–present)
- K-Pop Song of the Year (2025-present)
- Best New K-Pop Artist (2024–present)
- Producer of the Year (2017–present)
- Songwriter of the Year (2019-present)
- World Artist of the Year (2025-present)
- Best Lyrics (2014–present) ‡
- Best Music Video (2017–present) ‡
- Favorite On Screen (2025-present) ‡
- Favorite Tour Photographer (2019-present) ‡
- Favorite Tour Style (2025-present) ‡
- Favorite Tour Tradition (2025-present) ‡
- Favorite Surprise Guest (2025-present) ‡
- Favorite Broadway Debut (2025-present) ‡
- Favorite Soundtrack (2025-present) ‡
- Favorite K-Pop Collab (2026-present) ‡
- Favorite Debut Album (2026-present) ‡
- Favorite TikTok Dance (2026-present) ‡

=== Past award categories ===
- Best Song from a Movie (2016–2017) ‡
- Best Underground Alternative Band (2017) ‡
- Regional Mexican Album of the Year (2017)
- Album of the Year (2016)
- Biggest Triple Threat (2016) ‡
- Most Meme-able Moment (2016) ‡
- Hip-Hop/R&B Song of the Year (2014–2015)
- EDM Song of the Year (2014)
- Renegade (2015)
- Instagram Award (2014)
- Best Boy Band (2018) ‡
- Best Remix (2018) ‡

== Special awards ==
=== iHeartRadio Innovator Award ===
The honor is presented to artists for their contribution to popular culture.

- 2014: Pharrell Williams
- 2015: Justin Timberlake
- 2016: U2
- 2017: Bruno Mars
- 2018: Chance the Rapper
- 2019: Alicia Keys
- 2023: Taylor Swift
- 2024: Beyoncé
- 2025: Lady Gaga
- 2026: Miley Cyrus

=== iHeartRadio Icon Award ===
- 2018: Bon Jovi
- 2021: Elton John
- 2022: Jennifer Lopez
- 2023: Pink
- 2024: Cher
- 2025: Mariah Carey
- 2026: John Mellencamp

=== iHeartRadio Landmark Award ===
- 2024: Green Day, TLC
- 2025: Nelly
- 2026: Ludacris

=== Artist of the Decade ===
- 2019: Garth Brooks

=== Fangirls Award ===
- 2018: Camila Cabello
- 2019: Halsey

=== Young Influencer ===
- 2014: Ariana Grande

=== Trailblazer Award ===
- 2022: Megan Thee Stallion

=== Tour of the Century ===
- 2025: Taylor Swift

== Multiple wins and nominations ==
Most wins (as of 2026)

Rank	1st	2nd	3rd	4th	5th
Artist	Taylor Swift	Drake	BTS, Bruno Mars	Twenty One Pilots	The Chainsmokers
Total	41	13	12	11	10

Most nominations (as of 2026)

Rank	1st	2nd	3rd	4th	5th
Artist	Taylor Swift	Drake	Justin Bieber	Ariana Grande	Bad Bunny
Total	75	52	42	39	31

== Performances ==
Year	Performers (chronologically)
2014	Pitbull (featuring G.R.L.); Luke Bryan; Bastille; Ed Sheeran; Ariana Grande; Usher; Kendrick Lamar; Thirty Seconds to Mars; Shakira; Blake Shelton; Arcade Fire; Pharrell Williams
2015	Iggy Azalea & Jennifer Hudson; Nick Jonas; Florida Georgia Line; Meghan Trainor; Kelly Clarkson; Rihanna; Sam Smith; Jason Aldean; Madonna & Taylor Swift; Jason Derulo; Jamie Foxx & Chris Brown; Nate Ruess; Snoop Dogg & Charlie Wilson
2016	Jason Derulo; Justin Bieber; Meghan Trainor; Fetty Wap; Pitbull; Chris Brown; Demi Lovato & Brad Paisley; DNCE & Nile Rodgers; G-Eazy (featuring Bebe Rexha); Maroon 5; ZAYN; The Weeknd; Iggy Azalea
2017	Katy Perry (featuring Skip Marley); Big Sean; Noah Cyrus & Labrinth; Ed Sheeran; The Chainsmokers & Chris Martin; Thomas Rhett; Shawn Mendes; Bruno Mars
2018	Cardi B (featuring G-Eazy); Ed Sheeran; Camila Cabello (featuring Young Thug); Maroon 5; Eminem (featuring Kehlani); Bon Jovi; Charlie Puth; N.E.R.D
2019	Halsey (featuring Travis Barker & Yungblud); Kacey Musgraves & Chris Martin; Marshmello & Lauv; Lovelytheband; Ella Mai; John Legend; Backstreet Boys; Alicia Keys; Ariana Grande; Garth Brooks
2020	Cancelled
2021	The Weeknd & Ariana Grande; Dan + Shay; Bruno Mars & Anderson .Paak; H.E.R., Brandi Carlile & Demi Lovato; Doja Cat; Usher
2022	LL Cool J; Jennifer Lopez; Megan Thee Stallion; Jason Aldean; John Legend; Charlie Puth; Måneskin
2023	P!nk; Pat Benatar, Neil Giraldo & Kelly Clarkson; Coldplay; Cody Johnson; Jax; Lenny Kravitz; Latto; Muni Long; Keith Urban; Giovannie and the Hired Guns
2024	Justin Timberlake; Green Day; Tate McRae; Jelly Roll; Lainey Wilson; TLC; Latto; Jennifer Hudson; Cher; Ludacris; T-Pain
2025	Billie Eilish; Finneas; Nelly; City Spud; Gracie Abrams; Muni Long; Tori Kelly; GloRilla; K Carbon; Sexyy Red; Kenny Chesney; Taylor Swift; Bad Bunny
2026	Alex Warren; Lainey Wilson; TLC, En Vogue, Salt-N-Pepa & DJ Spinderella; John Mellencamp; Kehlani; Raye; Ludacris

== See also ==
- iHeartRadio Much Music Video Awards
- iHeartRadio Music Festival
