= Crumbsnatchers =

Nashville indie rock band

- Origin: Knoxville, Tennessee, United States
- Genres: indie; indie rock; garage rock; new wave; punk
- Years active: 2012–present
- Label: Like You Mean It Records
- Members: Samuel "Guetts" Guetterman
- Website: www.crumbsnatchersband.com

Crumbsnatchers is an indie rock band established in Knoxville, Tennessee in 2012. The band consists of band members Samuel "Guetts" Guetterman (rhythm guitar, vocals), Philip Mosteller (lead guitar), Ethan Mausolf (drums), and a few other musicians who lend their talents.

== History ==
The band's name was pulled from frontman "Guetts" Guetterman's experience at a faith-based juvenile detention center in Georgia as a teenager. "Crumbsnatchers” was a patronizing nickname the staff used to tease the touring church choir he was a part of. There, secular music was prohibited, but one of Guetterman's peers smuggled in a CD player and a copy of Radiohead’s In Rainbows that the boys secretly listened to.

In 2011, Crumbsnatchers formed when Guetterman returned to Knoxville, Tennessee and reunited with longtime friend and lead guitarist Philip Mosteller. Alongside bassist Sam Burchfield and drummer Rylan Bledsoe, they began to work on songs together in the apartment and rehearsal space Guetterman kept above his parents’ garage. The band then began working on their debut LP, Big House. The album was recorded at Knoxville's Famous London Recording Studio and was self-released in 2016.

Now, Crumbsnatchers resides in Nashville, Tennessee and has signed to record label Like You Mean It Records. On March 1, 2024, Crumbsnatchers released their sophomore album, PETWAY.

== Discography ==
=== Albums ===
- Big House (May 20, 2016)
- PETWAY (March 1, 2024)

=== Singles ===
- Satin Glow (November 22, 2020)
- All Mine (May 21, 2021)
- One Call (July 3, 2021)
- Keep Your Honey (March 11, 2022)
- SAM (October 20, 2023)
- Seeping (January 19, 2024)
- Saturday (February 16, 2024)
