= House of Cards (Radiohead song) =

2007 song

Promotional single by Radiohead

from the album In Rainbows
- A-side: "Bodysnatchers"
- Released: April 6, 2008 (radio)
- Recorded: 2005–2007
- Genre: Ambient pop; art pop; art rock
- Length: 5:28
- Label: ATO; TBD; XL
- Songwriters: Colin Greenwood; Jonny Greenwood; Ed O'Brien; Philip Selway; Thom Yorke
- Producer: Nigel Godrich

Music video
- "House of Cards" on YouTube

"House of Cards" is a song by the English rock band Radiohead, from their seventh studio album, In Rainbows (2007). It was serviced to American modern rock radio on April 6, 2008, as a promotional single.

The music video, directed by James Frost, was produced using motion capture and lidar technology and released in June 2008. "House of Cards" was nominated for the Grammy Awards for Best Rock Performance by a Duo or Group with Vocal, Best Rock Song and Best Music Video.

== Writing ==
"House of Cards"

The Radiohead singer, Thom Yorke, first performed "House of Cards" in an acoustic rendition at the 2005 Trade Justice rally in London. According to the bassist, Colin Greenwood, an early version had a bass riff in the style of R.E.M. The guitarist Jonny Greenwood wanted it to sound like an Iggy Pop song, but conceded that this "would probably have killed something beautiful and tender". Yorke and the drummer, Philip Selway, reworked the song with the rhythm on the final version.

Yorke described "House of Cards" as "mellow and summery", and likened it to the 1968 instrumental "Albatross" by Fleetwood Mac. Rolling Stone described it as "surprisingly sexy", with references to the key parties of the 1970s and 1980s. In a 2008 television performance, Yorke dedicated the refrain, "denial, denial", to the American president George W. Bush for rejecting the Kyoto Protocol, an international treaty to reduce greenhouse gases.

== Music video ==
The "House of Cards" music video was directed by James Frost. Instead of traditional cameras, it was made with motion capture technology developed by Geometric Informatics and lidar technology developed by Velodyne Lidar. This produced 3D versions of Yorke's face, "like the computer simulation of a mountain range", and "ghostly exteriors and indoor party shots". The Guardian described the video as "spectral, dazzling and eerie", and The Quietus said it had a "haunting hyper-futuristic aspect".

Yorke wrote on Radiohead's website: "It was a strange experience, sitting in front of a laser in the dark, then emailing back and forth with James the director as he sat in front of computers for a whole month with the amazing technicians who processed the data ... But it says something about the song and came out better than I had dared hope." He was interested in using technology in unintended ways, and liked the idea of turning human beings into "mathematical points ... and how strangely emotional it ended up being". Frost said it was "a direct reflection of where we are in society. Everything is [computer] data. Everything around us is data-driven in some shape or form. We are so reliant on it that it seems like our lives are digital."

The data used to make the video was released as open source under the Creative Commons Attribution-Noncommercial-Share Alike 3.0 license on Google Code as comma-separated values (CSV) raw data, and Processing language code. Radiohead collaborated with Google to host a making-of documentary and a selection of rendered scenes.

== Release ==
"House of Cards" was released on Radiohead's seventh album, In Rainbows (2007). Along with another song, "Bodysnatchers", it was serviced to American modern rock radio on April 6, 2008, as a promotional single. At the 51st Annual Grammy Awards, it was nominated for Best Rock Performance by a Duo or Group with Vocal, Best Rock Song and Best Music Video. A performance of "House of Cards" was included on the 2008 live video In Rainbows – From the Basement.

== Charts ==
Chart (2008)	Peak position
US Adult Alternative Airplay (Billboard)	24

== Certifications ==
Region	Certification	Certified units/sales
Canada (Music Canada)	Gold	40,000^{‡}
^{‡} Sales+streaming figures based on certification alone.

== Release history ==
Region	Date	Format	Label
United States	April 6, 2008	Modern rock radio	ATO, TBD
