= Nude (song) =

2008 single by Radiohead

Single by Radiohead

from the album In Rainbows
- B-side: "4 Minute Warning"; "Down Is the New Up"
- Released: 31 March 2008
- Recorded: 2005–2007
- Genre: Art rock; dream pop
- Length: 4:15
- Label: XL; TBD
- Songwriters: Colin Greenwood; Jonny Greenwood; Ed O'Brien; Philip Selway; Thom Yorke
- Producer: Nigel Godrich

Radiohead singles chronology
"Jigsaw Falling into Place" (2008)	"Nude" (2008)	"Harry Patch (In Memory Of)" (2009)

Music video
- "Nude" on YouTube

"Nude" is a song by the English rock band Radiohead, released in March 2008 as the second single from their seventh album, In Rainbows (2007).

Radiohead first recorded "Nude" during the sessions for their third album, OK Computer (1997), but were not satisfied with the results. They performed it several times over the following decade and it became one of their best-known unreleased songs. The final version was rearranged around a bassline written by Colin Greenwood.

"Nude" was promoted with a music video and a competition inviting fans to create remixes using the separated stem tracks. Boosted by sales of the stems, "Nude" reached number 21 on the UK singles chart and number 37 on the US Billboard Hot 100, making it Radiohead's first US top-40 hit since their debut single, "Creep", in 1993.

== History ==
"Nude" had working titles including "Failure to Receive Repayment Will Put Your House at Risk", "Big Ideas" and "(Don't Get Any) Big Ideas". The final title derives from an early version of the chorus, which included the line "What do you look like when you're nude?"

Radiohead recorded a version of "Nude" during the first sessions for their third album, OK Computer (1997), with their producer, Nigel Godrich. This version, inspired by Al Green, featured a Hammond organ, a "straighter" feel and different lyrics. Radiohead were initially pleased with the recording, but came to dislike it.

"Nude" was first performed live by the singer, Thom Yorke, in the late 1990s during a solo performance in Japan. Radiohead performed it several times over the following decade and it became one of their best-known unreleased songs. They and Godrich worked on "Nude" again during the sessions for their albums Kid A (2000) and Hail to the Thief (2003), but were not satisfied with the results. In 2004, Yorke said he had considered asking Elvis Costello and the Attractions to record it, feeling they would do a better job, but that he did not have the courage.

During the early sessions for Radiohead's seventh album, In Rainbows (2007), Colin Greenwood wrote a new bassline for the song. According to Godrich, this "transformed it from something very straight into something that had much more of a rhythmic flow". The band also removed a chorus and wrote a new ending. They performed the new arrangement, along with other new material, on their 2006 tour before recording three takes for In Rainbows. The final take was used, with overdubs recorded in the Hospital Club in Covent Garden, London.

Yorke said he did not enjoy singing "Nude" when it was first written, as it was "too feminine, too high". After it was finished, he said: "Now I enjoy it exactly for that reason – because it is a bit uncomfortable, a bit out of my range, and it's really difficult to do. And it brings something out in me." He said he also once felt the lyrics were too intimate and sweet, but now "seem to make sense". In 2008, Godrich said that songs "have a window where they are really most alive – and you have to capture it", and that "Nude" had missed its window. By reinventing the song, Radiohead were able to "capture it again in a way that resonated for the people playing it". He said the song had not changed, only the performers.

== Composition ==
"Nude"

Pitchfork described "Nude" as a "graceful and sorrowful" version of "sneering, knees-up" songs by the Kinks or Blur, or an inverse of Radiohead's 1998 single "No Surprises". The lyrics address "suburban ennui, crushing boredom, unfulfilling go-nowhere lives". The chord progression uses a double-tonic complex, suggesting the keys of both E major and its relative minor, C♯ minor. In live performances, the guitarist Ed O'Brien uses an EBow, an electronic sustaining device, to play in call-and-response with the ondes Martenot, played by Jonny Greenwood.

== Music video ==
The music video for "Nude" was directed by Adam Buxton and Garth Jennings. It premiered as part of a Radiohead webcast on 31 December 2007, one day before the retail release of In Rainbows. The video features Radiohead performing in slow motion with feathers filling the screen. Buxton and Jennings filmed the video quickly, then edited it on laptop and uploaded it to YouTube. Colin Greenwood said: "It was so cool because we didn't have to go through three weeks of video commissioning and receiving dodgy scripts set on abandoned skyscrapers in downtown LA or something. If you go in thinking 'let's try it', it's really liberating."

== Release ==
"Nude" was released as a single on 31 March 2008. Radiohead held a competition for fans to create remixes from the stem tracks of guitar, drums, bass, vocals and strings, available to purchase via iTunes. The entries were streamed on the Radiohead website. A performance of "Nude" was included on the 2008 live video In Rainbows – From the Basement.

Early versions of "Nude", recorded in the OK Computer period, were included in the special edition of the 2017 OK Computer reissue OKNOTOK 1997 2017 and the 2019 compilation MiniDiscs [Hacked]. Pitchfork wrote that the solo acoustic demo from Yorke on MiniDiscs [Hacked] was "spectral and difficult to make out, but therein lies its allure: it allows you to trace its journey from this demo to the song we know".

== Reception ==
"Nude" reached number 21 on the UK singles chart, outperforming the previous In Rainbows single, "Jigsaw Falling into Place". In the US, it reached number 37 on the Billboard Hot 100, making it Radiohead's second top-40 hit after their debut single, "Creep", reached number 34 in 1993. It was also the first Radiohead song to make the Billboard Pop 100. Sales included sales of the remix stems, boosting the single's chart performance.

Reviewing In Raindows for the Guardian, Alexis Petridis wrote that "with its strings and swooning guitars, 'Nude' sounds lushly romantic". In Pitchfork, Mark Pytlik described it as "big-hearted" with "keening melodies and immutable prettiness ... Yorke wrenching as much sweetness out of it as he possibly can". In 2020, the Guardian writer Jazz Monroe named "Nude" the seventh-greatest Radiohead song, writing: "After kicking around in Radiohead lore for more than a decade, 'Nude' ... found stunning form, first by channelling Björk – choppy coos, weeping strings – and then in a finale as bright and penetrating as dawn."

== Charts ==
Chart (2008)	Peak position
Austria (Ö3 Austria Top 40)	52
Belgium (Ultratop 50 Flanders)	12
Belgium (Ultratop 50 Wallonia)	16
Canada Hot 100 (Billboard)	8
Denmark (Tracklisten)	11
European Hot 100 Singles (Billboard)	30
Finland (Suomen virallinen lista)	7
France (SNEP)	76
Ireland (IRMA)	18
Italy (FIMI)	2
Netherlands (Single Top 100)	8
New Zealand (Recorded Music NZ)	23
Norway (VG-lista)	4
Portugal Digital Songs (Billboard)	1
Sweden (Sverigetopplistan)	25
UK Singles (Official Charts)	21
UK Indie (Official Charts)	1
US Billboard Hot 100	37

== Certifications ==
Region	Certification	Certified units/sales
Canada (Music Canada)	Gold	40,000^{‡}
New Zealand (RMNZ)	Gold	15,000^{‡}
United Kingdom (BPI)	Silver	200,000^{‡}
^{‡} Sales+streaming figures based on certification alone.

== Track listings ==
7"

1. "Nude"
2. "4 Minute Warning"

CD

1. "Nude" – 4:17
2. "Down Is the New Up" – 5:00
3. "4 Minute Warning" – 4:05

== Personnel ==
Radiohead

- Colin Greenwood
- Jonny Greenwood
- Ed O'Brien
- Philip Selway
- Thom Yorke

Additional musicians

- The Millennia Ensemble – strings
  - Everton Nelson – leading
  - Sally Herbert – conducting

Production

- Nigel Godrich – production, mixing, engineering
- Richard Woodcraft – engineering
- Hugo Nicolson – engineering
- Dan Grech-Marguerat – engineering
- Bob Ludwig – mastering

Artwork

- Stanley Donwood
- Dr Tchock
