= The Henry Clay People =

- Origin: Los Angeles, California, United States
- Genre: Indie rock
- Years active: 2005–2013
- Labels: TBD Records/Autumn Tone, MapleMusic Recordings (Canada)
- Members: Andy Siara; Harris Pittman; Eric Scott; Joey Siara
- Website: HenryClayPeople.com

The Henry Clay People was an American indie rock and punk band, formed by brothers Joey and Andy Siara.

== History ==
Joey and Andy Siara began playing with current drummer Eric Scott in 2002 under the name "Vallejo by Knife," which they changed in 2005 to The Henry Clay People. They have toured the United States multiple times, and have performed at Lollapalooza, SXSW, Austin City Limits Festival, Coachella, Riot Fest, Sasquatch Music Festival, and Bunbury Music Festival

In March 2010, original drummer Eric Scott rejoined the band for the summer 2010 U.S. Tour with Silversun Pickups and Against Me!

Their album Blacklist the Kid with the Red Moustache was recorded in Portland and Montreal in 2006 by Colin Stewart and Howard Bilerman and was self released in 2007. Their next album For Cheap or For Free was recorded in 2008 in Los Angeles by Dave Newton, Joe Napolitano, and Matt Molchany at The Ship studio in Eagle Rock, Los Angeles and released in November 2008 on Autumn Tone Records, an indie label started by the music blog Aquarium Drunkard. In March 2010, they announced that their next record will be released June 8 on TBD Records.

They released "Somewhere on the Golden Coast" on tbd Records in June 2010 and followed the release by touring the U.S. with Silversun Pickups and Against Me!. In Fall 2010 they toured the U.S. with Drive-By Truckers, followed by a headlining tour with The Dig opening.

In April 2011 they were guests on the Sklar Brother's podcast Sklarbro Country along with Amy Poehler. That same month they played the Coachella Valley Music and Arts Festival and released This Is A Desert EP on TBD Records.

In April 2012, they announced the title and release date of their new full-length record, Twenty-Five for the Rest of Our Lives, recorded, mixed and coproduced by Dan Long. "We wanted to finally make the record that our sixteen year old selves would have been excited about," says Joey. "Unfortunately the only way to do so was to live for the last 13 years and get some adult suffering under our belt. Now we can direct our misguided teenage angst at our failed 20s." On June 26, 2012, they released Twenty-Five for the Rest of Our Lives on TBD Records. Consequence of Sound gave it 4.5 out of 5 stars saying to "Add The Henry Clay People to this short list of bands defiantly waving rock and roll's weathered flag in 2012" along with Japandroids and Deer Tick. Paste Magazine calls it a "blitzkrieg (bop) of a record, a gasping sprint through 11 songs in just 31 minutes—frenetic and kinetic; bratty, naive, unapologetically nostalgic, a celebration of youth, rock 'n' roll, and playing rock 'n' roll while clinging to youth." They spent most of 2012 touring around the new record.

They are the "unofficial house band" of the Atlanta podcast Stuff You Should Know.

The band has appeared in film and on television. The Henry Clay People were featured in the 2009 film, Timer, with two of their songs appearing on the soundtrack. Joey and Andy portrayed "Retch" and "Zuckerman" the roommates and bandmates of the character Mikey. However, in the film the band was known as Truckbeef, which was the name of the film's production company. The song "Elly Vs The Eczema Princess" was performed in a bar scene in the film, but was called "Mom, Can I Call You Back? I Have to Dispose of the Body." The Henry Clay People were also featured in a 2010 episode of the television series Parenthood entitled "Date Night." The band appeared in the episode as themselves and a portion of the episode was said to be set at The Henry Clay People's album release party. The songs "This Ain't a Scene" and "Working Part-Time" were played on the show.

The Henry Clay People broke up in 2013. They played their last show on August 17, 2013 at Echo Park Rising in Los Angeles.

== Discography ==
- Discover the Mystery and Eat It (2003) as Vallejo By Knife
- Birdman and (the) Squid (2005)
- Blacklist the Kid With the Red Moustache (2007)
- Working Part Time E.P. (2008)
- Working Part Time 7" (2008)
- LIVE [Mondays (at the Echo) Vol. 7 – February 4, 2008] (2008)
- For Cheap or for Free (2008)
- Somewhere on the Golden Coast (2010)
- This Is a Desert E.P. (2011)
- Twenty-Five For the Rest of Our Lives (2012)
