= James Frost (video director) =

- Born: 29 June 1973 (age 53); London, England
- Occupation: Director

James Frost (born 29 June 1973 in London, England) is an English music video, commercial, and film director.

== Career ==
James Frost began his career in 1997 as part of the British directing duo James & Alex [Smith]. The pair produced work together starting at the Artists Company, and later at Ridley Scott Associates (RSA Films). The pair would direct the music video for the Coldplay song Yellow, which would be nominated for Best New Artist at the 2001 MTV Video Music Awards. The pair stopped working together in 2001 with Turin Brakes "72" being the last video they created together.

In 2002, Frost directed then up-and-coming singer Norah Jones in the California desert for the song "Come Away With Me"; Frost and Jones collaborated on two more videos from each of her subsequent releases, being "Sunrise" and "Until The End".

Frost became head of Blip Boutique, joined by creative partner Mary Fagot. Fagot was formerly Capital Records's creative director. Since its founding, Blip Boutique has collaborated with artists such as White Stripes, Elvis Costello, OK Go, and Phish. The video for "Killing Me" by Robyn was a collaboration between Fagot and Stopp Web. The company also worked with data visualizer and artist Aaron Koblin to create a video for Interpol using data visualization. Blip Boutique has since moved more into the world of interactive digital media and social network applications.

His 2008 "House of Cards" video for Radiohead, with technological assistance by Aaron Koblin, premiered on Google. No actual camera footage is used in the video; instead, it used LIDAR technology similar to that used in Google Maps. The video was made with assistance from students of the G-Star School of the Arts, and was nominated at the 51st Grammy Awards for Best Short Form Music Video in 2009.

In March 2010, Frost wrote “The return of Polaroid,” a piece celebrating the rebirth of Polaroid film through Polanoid. The piece was featured as part of the 30/30 series that marked the 30th Anniversary of Creative Review Magazine.

In 2010, James Frost collaborated with the rock band OK Go and engineering collective Syyn Labs to create a giant Rube Goldberg machine for a music video for the song "This Too Shall Pass". The video took five months to design and build and two days to shoot. It was shot on 11–12 February 2010 in a warehouse in the Echo Park neighborhood of Los Angeles; the final version is one continuous take. It was released via YouTube on 1 March 2010, and by January 2023 had been seen 71 million times. The video was awarded the AICP award and is part of the permanent collection at the Museum of Modern Art (MoMA) in New York City.

In 2012, Frost was commissioned to make a music video for Dave Matthews Band for the song Mercy from the album Away from the World. For the video, Frost used the crowdsourcing method by enlisting the help of Dave Matthews fans via the band's website. To carry out the concept, a series of actions were requested, each with detailed visual instructions in the album artwork style that users could download to help them film the required elements themselves.

In 2015, James Frost collaborated with Brittany Howard of Alabama Shakes to create a concept for a music video for the song Sound & Color. The video was nominated for Best Music Video at the 2016 NAACP Awards.

In 2019, Frost was approached by the Australian dance act Rüfüs Du Sol to collaborate on a visual piece that would be played at the HP Dome at the Coachella Music and Arts Festival in Indio, California. The film was screened to an estimated 100,000 people for the two consecutive weekends on 12 and 19 April .

In 2019, Frost also embarked on his first narrative project, a short film entitled Almond Wood. The film was co-written by James Frost and Patricia Rodriguez. It stars Kate Amundsen and Will Brandt. Principal photography took place in June 2019, with additional photography completed in October. Due to the COVID-19 Pandemic, post-production was halted in February 2020. The film was completed in the summer of 2021. It won several awards, including awards for Best Actress and Best Short Film at the Roma Short Film Festival as well as Best Thriller at the Paris Film Awards.

In 2020, Frost again teamed up with Rüfüs Du Sol to create a music video for their song Alive. Frost used Unreal Engine to create landscapes allowing the team complete control of the virtual camera in post-production. The project, which took 8 weeks to complete, received positive reception.

== Awards and nominations ==
- Coldplay's Yellow, nominated for a VMA Award for Best New Artist.
- Radiohead's House of Cards, nominated for a Grammy for Best Short Form Video, 2009
- Radiohead's "House Of Cards", Winner D&AD Yellow Pencil for Outstanding Achievement in Music Video,
- OK Go's "This Too Shall Pass", winner at UK Music Video Awards, 2010
