= From the Basement =

Web television series

- Created by: Nigel Godrich
- Directed by: David Barnard; Sophie Muller; Quin Williams; Vern Moen
- Country of origin: United Kingdom
- Original language: English
- No. of seasons: 2
- No. of episodes: 13

Production
- Producers: James Chads; John Woollcombe; Dilly Gent
- Production locations: Maida Vale Studios, London, England; The Hospital Club, Covent Garden, London
- Camera setup: Multi-camera

Original release
- Network: Sky Arts
- Release: 18 December 2006 – 7 January 2009

From the Basement is a British web television series created by the record producer Nigel Godrich. It features live musical performances in a studio without a host or audience.

== Development ==
In September 2006, it was announced that Godrich, along with the producers Dilly Gent, James Chads and John Woollcombe were shooting the music series From the Basement, filmed from London's Maida Vale Studios.

Godrich took inspiration from The Old Grey Whistle Test, a BBC music television series broadcast in the 1970s and 1980s, and the 1996 concert film Rock and Roll Circus, which documents concerts by the Rolling Stones and other acts. He told Pitchfork: "[It was amazing] to see such a snapshot of that time: you get to see [the musicians], warts and all... [We were] just saying what a shame it was that there wasn't anything that really felt as honest as that any more."

Godrich conceived From the Basement to capture "the true representation" of the artists' work without the pressure of television promotion or interference from presenters and audiences. He wrote that he wanted to make "bands as comfortable as possible so that they can give great performances without the usual agony of TV promo which everyone has to do but no one seems to enjoy".

Godrich produced the From the Basement pilot as an internet-only show. The full series received additional funding from Sky Arts in the UK and Rave and IFC in the USA.

== Broadcast ==
From the Basement launched on 18 December 2006. The first UK broadcast was on Sky Arts on 1 December 2007 and premiered in the US on Rave HD on 22 February 2008, followed by a run on the Independent Film Channel in the fall of 2008. The IFC chose to split the episodes listed below into shorter, half-hour segments. They were also amongst the final programmes broadcast by the now defunct YLE Extra in Finland.

A second series of shows ran on Sky Arts from 3 December 2008 to 7 January 2009. On 10 March 2009 the series of performances was released on DVD. A new series of From the Basement began on YouTube in May 2022, featuring acts including Idles, Warpaint, Caribou, and Geese.

== Episodes ==
Each episode of From The Basement features performances from several musical artists. The first episode featured Thom Yorke, the White Stripes, and a collaboration between Four Tet's Kieran Hebden and drummer Steve Reid. The episode was filmed by director Sophie Muller. Episode 6 of series 1 was filmed in Bob Clearmountain's Mix This! studio in Los Angeles rather than in London's Maida Vale Studios. There are also two full episodes of Radiohead performances, released as In Rainbows – From the Basement (2008) and The King of Limbs: Live from the Basement (2011).

=== Pilot ===
| No. | Title | Original release date | Prod. code |
|---|---|---|---|
| 1 | "Episode 1" | Unknown | 101 |
1. The White Stripes - "Blue Orchid / Party of Special Things to Do"; 2. Thom Yorke - "Videotape"; 3. Kieran Hebden and Steve Reid - "Mom's Marmalade"; 4. The White Stripes - "As Ugly as I Seem"; 5. Thom Yorke - "Down Is the New Up"; 6. The White Stripes - "Red Rain"; 7. The Big Brother Show Episode

=== Series 1 ===
| No. | Title | Original release date | Prod. code |
|---|---|---|---|
| 1 | "Episode 1" | Unknown | 101 |
1. The White Stripes - "Blue Orchid" / "Party of Special Things to Do"; 2. The Shins - "Turn on Me"; 3. Neil Hannon - "Lady of a Certain Age"; 4. The White Stripes - "Forever for Her (Is Over for Me)"; 5. The Shins - "Phantom Limb"; 6. The White Stripes - "Ugly as I Seem"; 7. The White Stripes - "Little Ghost"; 8. The Shins - "A Comet Appears"; 9. The Shins - "Australia"; 10. Neil Hannon - "Our Mutual Friend"; 11. The White Stripes - "Red Rain"
| 2 | "Episode 2" | Unknown | 102 |
1. Thom Yorke - "Videotape"; 2. Albert Hammond, Jr. - "Everyone Gets a Star" / "Postal Blowfish"; 3. Envelopes - "Free Jazz"; 4. Thom Yorke - "Analyse"; 5. Albert Hammond, Jr. - "Holiday" / "Hard to Live in the City"; 6. Envelopes - "Party"; 7. Thom Yorke - "Last Flowers"; 8. Envelopes - "Sister in Love"; 9. Thom Yorke - "Down Is the New Up"; 10. Albert Hammond, Jr. - "In Transit"
| 3 | "Episode 3" | Unknown | 103 |
1. Beck - "Motorcade"; 2. Jarvis Cocker - "Fat Children"; 3. Jarvis Cocker - "Running the World"; 4. Jamie Lidell - "The City"; 5. Beck - "Think I'm in Love"; 6. Jarvis Cocker - "Disney Time"; 7. Jamie Lidell - "A Little Bit More"; 8. Jarvis Cocker - "I Will Kill Again"; 9. Beck - "Landslide"; 10. Jarvis Cocker - "Black Magic"; 11. Beck - "Cellphone's Dead"
| 4 | "Episode 4" | Unknown | 104 |
1. Sonic Youth - "The Sprawl"; 2. José González - "Abram"; 3. José González - "How Low"; 4. Sonic Youth - "Hey Joni"; 5. José González - "Down the Line"; 6. José González - "Fold"; 7. Sonic Youth - "Incinerate"; 8. Laura Marling - "Your Only Doll (Dora)"; 9. Sonic Youth - "Jams Runs Free"; 10. José González - "Killing for Love"; 11. Sonic Youth - "Pink Steam"
| 5 | "Episode 5" | Unknown | 105 |
1. PJ Harvey - "White Chalk"; 2. Super Furry Animals - "Let the Wolves Howl at the Moon"; 3. Free Blood - "Ready"; 4. PJ Harvey - "The Piano"; 5. Super Furry Animals - "Neo Consumer"; 6. Super Furry Animals - "The Gateway Song" / "Run-Away"; 7. Operator Please - "Just a Song About Ping Pong"; 8. Operator Please - "Leave It Alone"; 9. Free Blood - "Quick and Painful"; 10. PJ Harvey - "The Devil"; 11. Super Furry Animals - "The Gift That Keeps Giving"; 12. Free Blood - "The Royal Family"; 13. PJ Harvey - "Grow"
| 6 | "Episode 6" | Unknown | 106 |
1. Damien Rice - "Delicate"; 2. Autolux - "Plantlife"; 3. Eels - Millicent, Don't Blame Yourself; 4. Damien Rice - "Rootless Tree"; 5. Autolux - "Turnstile Blues"; 6. Eels - "It's a Mutherfucker"; 7. Architecture in Helsinki - "Maybe You Can Owe Me"; 8. Damien Rice - "9 Crimes"; 9. Autolux - "Supertoys"; 10. Eels - "Cheater's Guide"; 11. Architecture in Helsinki - "Heart It Races"; 12. Damien Rice - "The Blower's Daughter"

=== Series 2 ===
| No. | Title | Original release date | Prod. code |
|---|---|---|---|
| 1 | "Episode 1" | Unknown | 201 |
1. Gnarls Barkley - "Going on" / "Crazy" / "Who's gonna save my soul" 2. Sparks - "Good Morning" / "Stange Animal" / "I Can't Believe That You Would Fall for All The Crap in This Song" / "Lighten Up, Morrissey" / "Propaganda/At Home, At Work, At Play"; 3. The Kills - "Tape Song" / "Getting Down" / "Goodnight Bad Morning"
| 2 | "Episode 2" | Unknown | 202 |
1. My Morning Jacket - "Thank You Too!" / "One Big Holiday" / "Touch Me I´m Going To Scream, Pt.2"/; 2. The Fall - "Is This New" / "Wolf Kidult Man" / "50 Year Old Man" / "Latch Key Kid"; 3. White Denim - "All You Really Have to Do/ Mess Up Your Hair" / "Heart From Us All" / "New Coat"
| 3 | "Episode 3" | Unknown | 203 |
1. Iggy Pop and The Stooges - "Trollin'" / "Little Doll" / "Loose"; 2. CSS - "Let's Make Love and Listen to Death from Above" / "Off the Hook" / "Left Behind" / "Let´s Reggae All Night"; 3. The Shortwave Set - "No Social" / "Casual Use collage!!!"
| 4 | "Episode 4" | Unknown | 204 |
1. Radiohead - "The Gloaming" / "Where I End and You Begin"; 2. Andrew Bird - "Tenuousness" / "Plasticities"; 3. Fleet Foxes - "Blue Ridge Mountains" / "Sun Giant" / "English House" / "Your Protector"
| 5 | "Episode 5" | Unknown | 205 |
1. The Raconteurs - "Carolina Drama", "Consoler of the Lonely", "Rich Kid Blues/Kissy Kissy"; 2. Seasick Steve - "Thunderbird" / "St. Louis Slim" / "Walkin´Man"; 3. Band of Horses - "Ode To LRC" / "The Great Salt Lake" / "Detlef Shrempf"
| 6 | "Episode 6" | Unknown | 206 |
1. Queens of the Stone Age - "Millionaire" / "Mexicola" / "Turnin' On The Screw" / "Monsters in the Parasol" / "I think I Lost My Headache"; 2. Cold War Kids - "Cryptomnesia" / "Mexican Dogs" / "I've Seen Enough" / "Bullies Always Win"; 3. Zee Avi - "Monte"
