= BigChampagne =

American media measurement company

- Type: Subsidiary
- Industry: Internet; Metrics
- Founded: U.S. (2000)
- Headquarters: Hollywood, California
- Parent: Live Nation Entertainment Ticketmaster
- Website: LiveNation.com

BigChampagne was a technology-driven media measurement company acquired by Live Nation Entertainment. The BigChampagne dashboard was used primarily by music industry professionals such as concert promoters, venues, radio programmers, managers, agents, and marketers to access information about the popularity of artists and songs across radio airplay, online streaming, social activity, sales, and live events. BigChampagne provided a number of services related to producing business intelligence (BI) and competitive intelligence (CI) for users of the dashboard via access to proprietary data and data management (integration and analysis) combined with web applications and other technologies.

== Background ==
BigChampagne was co-founded by Eric Garland, Adam Toll, and Zachary Allison in 2000. The company was funded entirely by the founders, without outside capital. Musician Glen Phillips was an early adviser and supporter. The company's earliest service tracked the popularity of songs on the original Napster file-sharing service.

Co-founder Adam Toll has said that the company was named for a lyric in the Peter Tosh song "Downpressor Man": "You drink your big champagne and laugh."

BigChampagne has courted some controversy; the company's early focus on Napster and other file sharing networks originally discouraged major music companies from working with them. In 2003, founder Eric Garland testified before the California State Senate that online file sharing was "fundamentally unstoppable." The Recording Industry Association of America publicly criticized his remarks. Beginning in 2002 BigChampagne was involved in a lawsuit with a company called Webspins. Both companies alleged defamation and unfair business practices. The suit was settled out of court in 2003 but the terms of the settlement were not disclosed. Also in 2003, Altnet, a distribution partner of file sharing service Kazaa, sent legal threats to BigChampagne and eight other companies alleging patent infringement. BigChampagne was dropped from the list of targeted companies almost immediately.

The Electronic Frontier Foundation hoped to use the record industry's relationship with BigChampagne to defend file sharing networks like Kazaa as they believed using the networks for market information constituted a non-infringing use of the networks. This defense proved unsuccessful.

Data provided by BigChampagne is used by companies to help make decisions about signing artists and promoting music online and to radio stations; broadcasters use BigChampagne to inform playlist decisions. Led Zeppelin used BigChampagne to choose songs for a 2007 reunion "with good results." BigChampagne also collaborated with Radiohead to assess the impact of the band's pay-what-you-wish album In Rainbows.

In 2006, BigChampagne contributed data and analysis to Wired editor-in-chief Chris Anderson and was featured in The New York Times best-seller "The Long Tail: Why the Future Business is Selling Less of More".

BigChampagne's metrics and analysis have been cited by media outlets including The New York Times, The Wall Street Journal, The Financial Times, USA Today, and National Public Radio (NPR).

In 2011, BigChampagne was acquired by Live Nation Entertainment and is currently part of OnTour with Ticketmaster.

== Business model ==
BigChampagne generates revenue from dashboard subscription fees and consulting fees. The company is primarily a "B2B", selling information "business-to-business," though some aspects of BigChampagne's data and analysis are available to the general public. The company's business model is similar to the Bloomberg Terminal, Omniture, or a number of Nielsen Company products and services.

== Products ==
=== BC Dash ===
BigChampagne's BC Dash is a software platform for integrating, analyzing, and reporting information about radio airplay, online streaming, social activity, sales, and live events.

Partners and data sources include iHeartMedia, Mediabase, YouTube, iTunes, TIDAL, VEVO, Napster, Slacker, StreetPulse, Facebook, Instagram, and Twitter.

=== Ultimate Chart ===
The Ultimate Chart is a ranked list of the most popular music based on sales, radio, streaming, & social media. Available charts include Artists, Songs, Top Tours, Emerging Artists, and genre charts (Country, EDM, and Latin).
