= In Rainbows – From the Basement =

Video by Radiohead
- Released: 24 June 2008
- Recorded: April 2008
- Studios: The Hospital Club, London
- Genres: Alternative rock; avant-rock; art pop
- Length: 44:48; 63:09 (2020 upload)
- Producer: Nigel Godrich

Radiohead chronology
Radiohead: The Best Of (2008)	In Rainbows – From the Basement (2008)	The King of Limbs (2011)

In Rainbows – From the Basement is a 2008 live video by the English rock band Radiohead. It features performances of eight songs from Radiohead's seventh album, In Rainbows (2007), plus six other songs.

== Production ==
In Rainbows – From the Basement was recorded in April 2008 at the Hospital studio in Covent Garden, London, and directed by David Barnard. Radiohead performed songs from In Rainbows (2007), plus three from Hail to the Thief (2003) and one from Kid A (2000).

== Release ==
In Rainbows – From the Basement premiered on VH1 in May 2008. It was released on iTunes and on DVD in Japan. It was followed in 2011 by The King of Limbs: Live From the Basement.

On 4 June 2020, the video premiered on YouTube, as part of Radiohead's "quarantine concert series" to compensate for a lack of live performances during the COVID-19 pandemic.

== Setlist ==
The following setlist is from the uploads on Radiohead's YouTube channel.

1. "Weird Fishes / Arpeggi" (5:20, from In Rainbows)
2. "15 Step" (3:56, from In Rainbows)
3. "Bodysnatchers" (4:15, from In Rainbows)
4. "Nude" (4:20, from In Rainbows)
5. "The Gloaming" (3:10, from Hail to the Thief)
6. "Myxomatosis" (3:54, from Hail to the Thief)
7. "House of Cards" (5:28, from In Rainbows)
8. "Bangers + Mash" (3:30, from In Rainbows Disk 2)
9. "Optimistic" (4:39, from Kid A)
10. "Reckoner" (5:03, from In Rainbows)
11. "Videotape" (4:46, from In Rainbows)
12. "Where I End And You Begin" (4:23, from Hail to the Thief)
13. "All I Need" (4:21, from In Rainbows)
14. "Go Slowly" (3:54, from In Rainbows Disk 2)

== Personnel ==
Radiohead

- Ed O'Brien – guitar, effects, percussion, backing vocals
- Colin Greenwood – bass guitar, keyboard, percussion
- Jonny Greenwood – guitar, laptop, keyboard, percussion, glockenspiel
- Philip Selway – drums, percussion
- Thom Yorke – vocals, guitar, piano, keyboard, drums

Production

- David Barnard – director
- Nigel Godrich, Dilly Gent, James Chads & John Woollcombe – producers
- Brett Turnbull – director of photography
- Jerry Chater – editing
- Fred Jackson & Martin Dineley – sound engineering
- Nigel Godrich – production and mixing
- Richard Woodcraft – recording assistant
