= Modern slavery =

Modern slavery is Contemporary slavery, or neo-slavery, refers to the severe exploitation of people through the abuse of vulnerability for personal and economic gains. While modern slavery in the form of forced labour, child labour and human trafficking is pervasive around the world and encompasses unethical practices, it is strictly illegal and a serious criminal offence in many countries in the Global North.

Despite its pervasive nature, the world is no closer to eliminating modern slavery. Many Northern jurisdictions in the Global North, have enacted legislation to address forced labour, child labour and human trafficking, with examples including the US Dodd-Frank Act’s conflict mineral reporting rules, the California Transparency in Supply Chains Act, the UK, (UK Modern Slavery Act, 2015) France, Germany, the EU and Australia (Australian Modern Slavery Act 2018), The Uyghur Forced Labor Prevention Act (UFLPA) (USA). Much of this legislation requires companies within those countries to produce things like annual modern slavery statements or due diligence reports to show they are managing their supply chains properly and ensuring workers are treated fairly. A critical view is that much of this legislation, including the UK Modern Slavery Act, places too much emphasis on disclosure by companies in the Global North rather than on effective action to curb forced labour and exploitation in their supplier factories, particularly those operating in the Global South. Existing legislation also appears to serve as a tool for Northern companies to manage their own supply chain risks rather than address the risk of workers being victim of slavery and forced labour
