= The Hospital Club =

Members' club and media facility in London, England

Coordinates: 51°30′53″N 0°7′29″W

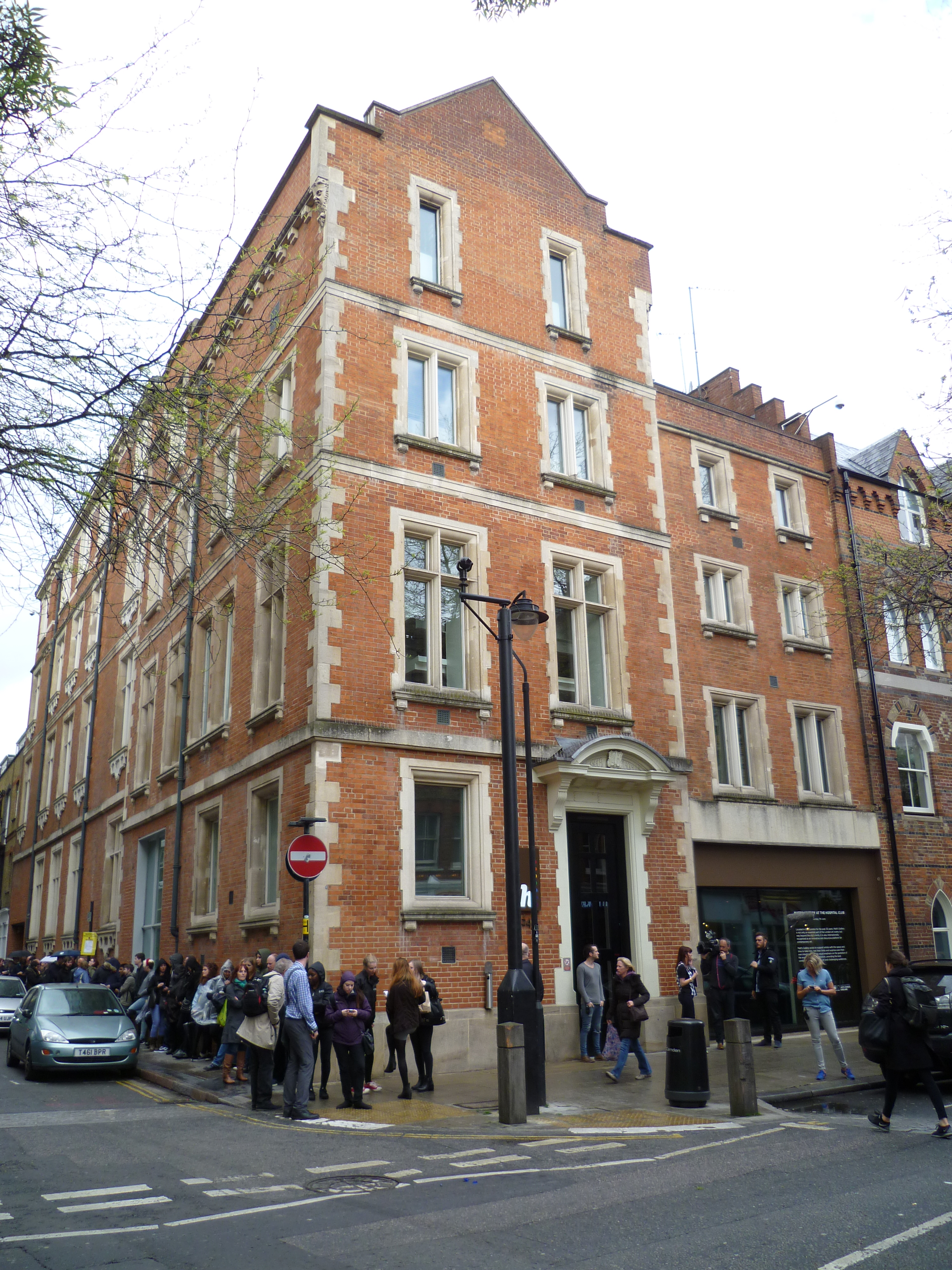
The Hospital Club, main entrance

The Hospital Club, later renamed the H Club, was a members' club for people in the creative industries in London, England. It housed a television studio (h Studio), recording studio, screening room, live performance space, restaurant, lounges and gallery over seven floors.

The club was located at 24 Endell Street, Covent Garden, on the site of an 18th-century hospital. It was founded in 2004 by the Microsoft co-founder Paul Allen and the musician Dave Stewart of Eurythmics.

In 2017, the Hospital Club opened a second location in the former Redbury Hotel in Hollywood, California. In 2020, both clubs closed permanently due to the effects of the COVID-19 pandemic and other "extenuating circumstances".

== History ==
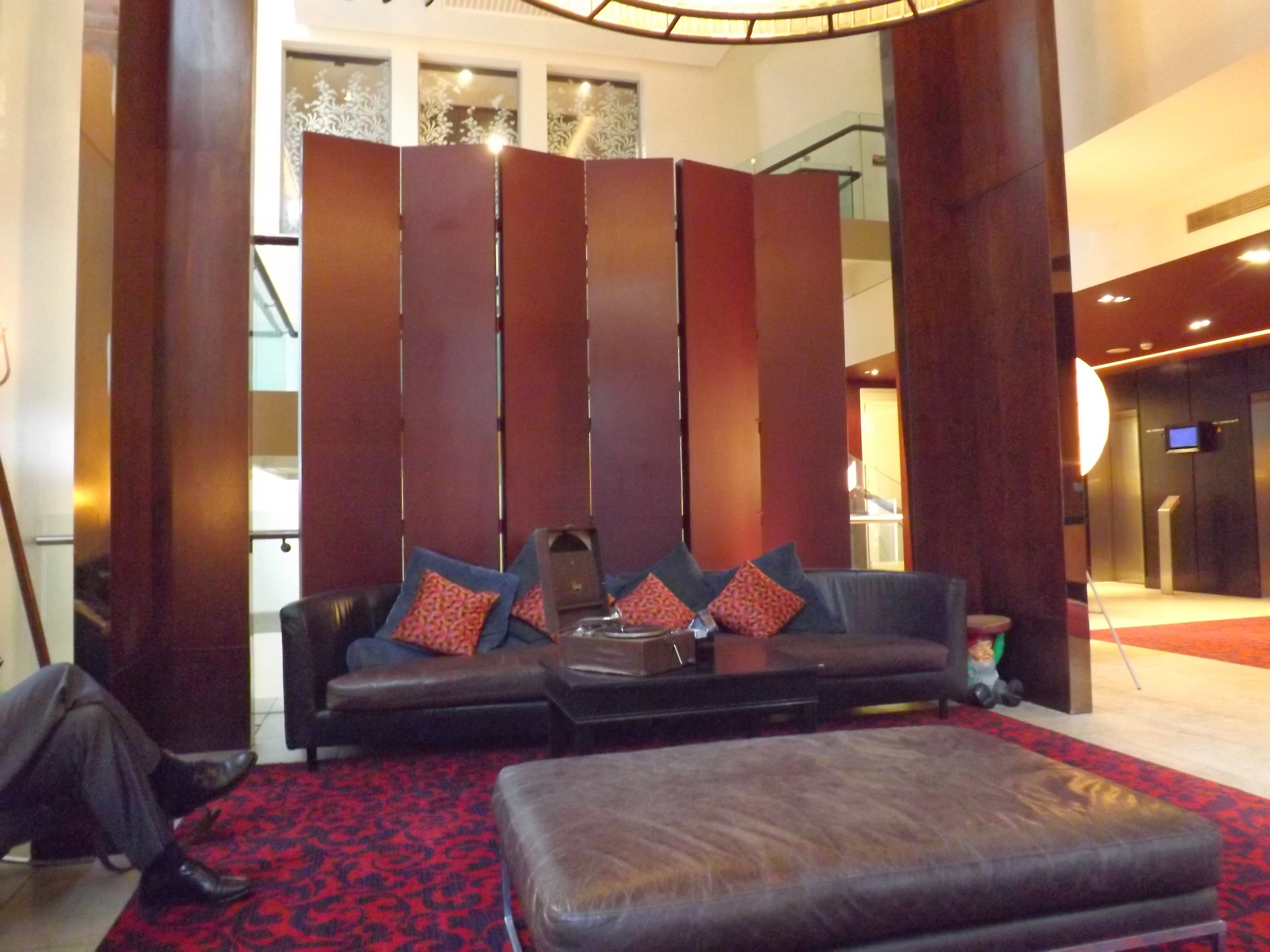
Reception

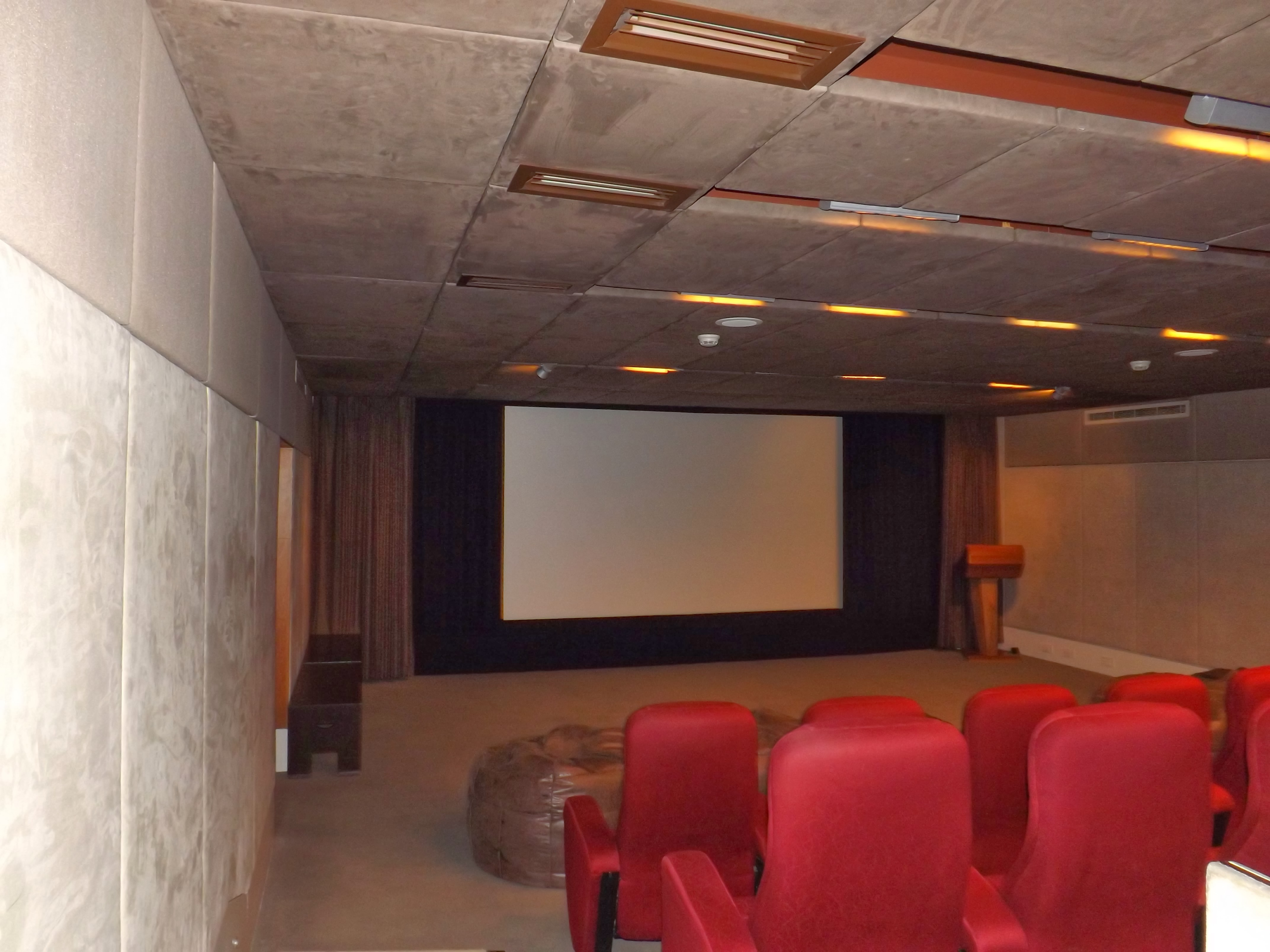
Cinema

The Hospital Club was founded in 2004 by the Microsoft co-founder Paul Allen, through his investment company Vulcan Inc., and the musician Dave Stewart of Eurythmics.

For many years the building was home to St Paul's Hospital, first established in 1749.

- 1749 — British Lying-In Hospital opened at 24 Endell Street
- 1913 — British Lying-In Hospital closed
- 1923 — St Paul's Hospital moves from Red Lion Square to 24 Endell Street
- 1992 — St Paul's Hospital closed
- 1996 — Building purchased by Paul Allen, planning submitted. Local objections to development mean the project stalls for a number of years while a compromise with residents is worked out
- 2004 — Private members' club, restaurant and recording studio open
- 2017 — the Hospital Club opens a second location in the former Redbury Hotel in Hollywood, California.
- 2020 — The club closed permanently due to the effects of the COVID-19 pandemic and other "extenuating circumstances".
- 2021 — The contents of the London club were sold at auction on 15 September.

== Food hygiene ratings ==
In 2014, the club received a zero rating for food hygiene after an inspection found mice faeces in kitchens, prompting worries of cross-contamination. In 2015, the Hospital Club received a five-star rating by the Food Standards Agency.

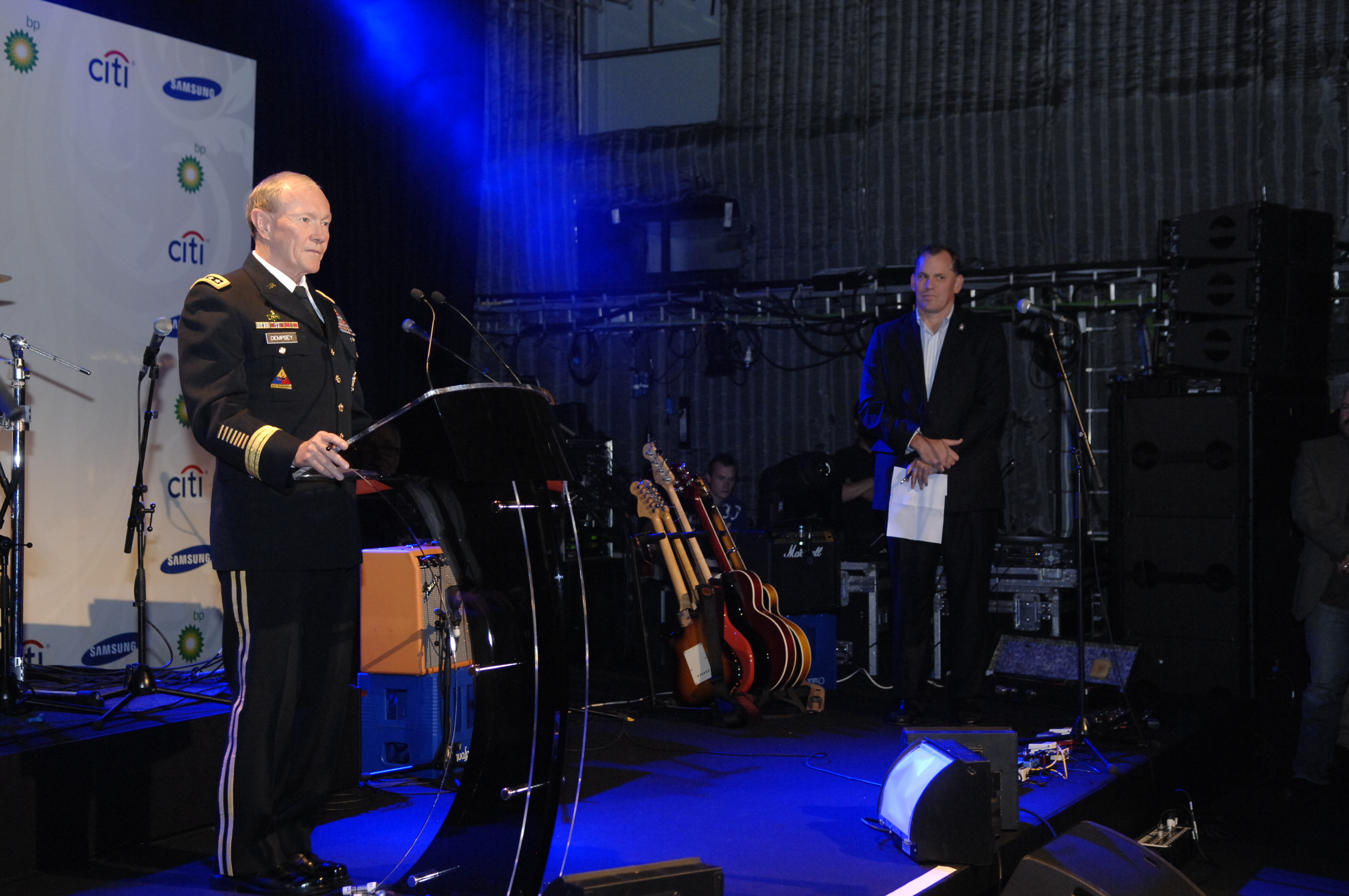
Post-Paralympics legacy event in the studio

== Television studio (h Studio) ==
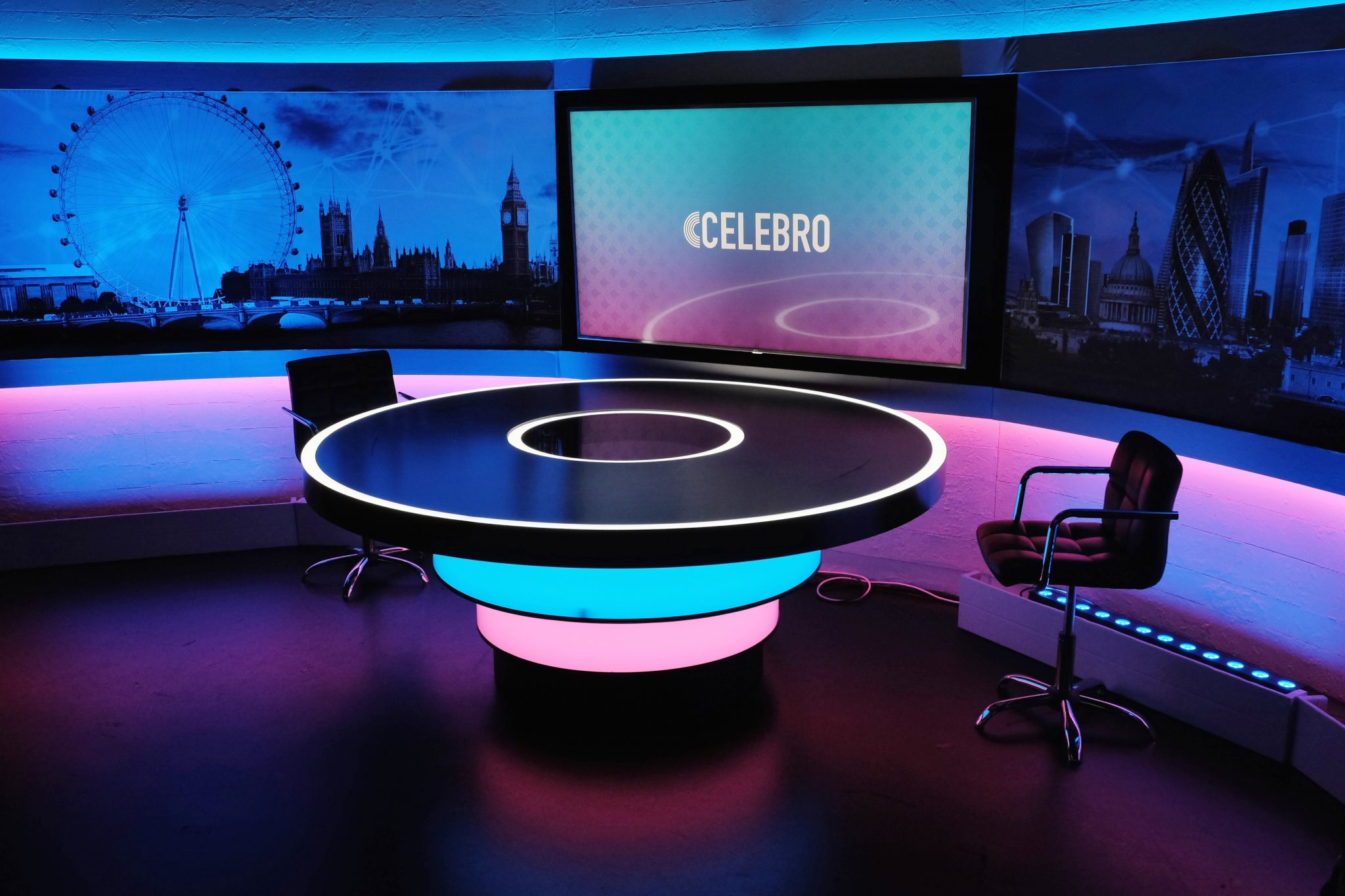
A new TV set installed by Celebro in the studio

The venue's 2,700 square feet (250 m^{2}) television studio is located two floors below ground level, and when it opened in 2003 was the first high-definition television studio in the UK. A grid height of 4.4 metres (14 ft) and a size of 61 feet x 44 feet, roughly equivalent to that of Television Centre's TC2, means it was well used for programme production.

The studio can accommodate an audience of approximately 250 people sitting or standing. The sound production room was upgraded in conjunction with Solid State Logic. In summer 2023, was announced that the studio would be re-opening after an extensive refit. Celebro Studios has taken over the running of the studio site and is to install a second smaller podcasting and streaming studio on the site.

From January 2026, it was announced that ITV daytime shows Lorraine, This Morning and Loose Women will move to the Hospital Club studio as part of cost-cutting measures.

== In media ==
The Hospital Club was used by the rock band Radiohead to record parts of their 2007 album In Rainbows and the 2008 live video In Rainbows – From the Basement.
