= Aniboom =

Animation studio

- Company type: Limited liability company
- Website type: Animation studio
- Founded: January 2006
- Headquarters: Tel Aviv, Israel; San Francisco, California
- Key people: Uri Shinar, Founder & CEO
- Website: Aniboom Facebook page
- Registration: Optional (required to upload, rate, and comment on videos)
- Launched: November 24, 2006
- Current status: Defunct

Aniboom was an online animation studio which distributed independent animated short films and occasionally co-produced them. It was founded in 2006 by former Israeli television executive Uri Shinar. Within three years, over 13,000 clips were released through the studio, at which point The New York Times described Aniboom's business structure as perhaps the largest example of crowdsourcing in the entertainment industry.

The studio's website went live in late September 2006. Its official launch was not announced however, until November 24 of that year. The launch was accompanied by a contest, running through January 30 of the following year, in which the creators of the website's most highly rated films up to that point received monetary prizes. Over the following years, similar contests were held, and Aniboom expanded its online presence to include channels on Joost and YouTube. In 2008, the studio raised $10 million in investor funding.

The Aniboom short "Live Music" was picked up by Sony for theatrical distribution in 2009, as an opener for Planet 51. The same year, Aniboom ran a competition in partnership with the Fox Broadcasting Company – the best holiday themed short film, as chosen by Fox executives, would win $15,000 and the possibility of a development deal. The contest was won by Jay Malone for the short film Santa Intervention.
