= TBD Records =

- Parent company: ATO Records
- Founded: 2007
- Founder: Coran Capshaw, Phil Costello
- Defunct: 2015
- Distributor(s): RED Distribution
- Genre: Indie rock Alternative rock Electronica
- Country of origin: United States
- Official website: www.tbdrecords.com

TBD Records (previously Side One Recordings) was an American record label co-founded by Coran Capshaw and Phil Costello, and is a sublabel of ATO Records, distributed by RED Distribution. The label was founded in August 2007 and quickly announced its first release, the band Underworld's first studio album in five years, Oblivion with Bells. Side One Recordings gained attention when it was connected with the CD release of Radiohead's 2007 album In Rainbows in the United States and Canada. In 2008 they signed the British band Hatcham Social, releasing their debut album You Dig The Tunnel I'll Hide The Soil in June 2009.

== Name change from Side One Recordings ==
Due to legal issues with a similarly named operator in the U.S., Side One Recordings was forced to change its name. This brought Underworld and Radiohead under the same newly named label. According to the TBD Records website, "The original name for this record company was Side One Recordings. But some potential issues caused us to figure out a new name, and quick. We came up with TBD as it seemed appropriate for the situation, but we like it."

== Artists signed to the label ==
- 22-20s
- Hatcham Social
- Port O'Brien
- Autolux
- Radiohead
- White Rabbits
- The Henry Clay People

== Discography ==
=== Albums ===
- Underworld - Oblivion with Bells (2007)
- Radiohead - In Rainbows (2008), The King of Limbs (2011), TKOL RMX 1234567 (2011)
- White Rabbits - It's Frightening (2009)
- Other Lives - Other Lives (2009), Tamer Animals (2011)
- Hatcham Social - You Dig The Tunnel I'll Hide The Soil (2009)
- Port O'Brien - Threadbare (2009)
- Autolux - Transit Transit (2010)
- The Henry Clay People - Somewhere on the Gold Coast (2010)
- White Rabbits - Milk Famous (2012)
- The Henry Clay People - Twenty-Five For The Rest Of Our Lives (2012)

=== EPs ===
- Other Lives - Other Lives (2008)
- Hatcham Social - Postcard In Colours (2009)
- White Rabbits - Percussion Gun Digital EP (2009)
- Port O'Brien - Pan American Sessions (2010)

== See also ==
- List of record labels
