= Diversafest =

Music event in Oklahoma, USA

DFEST: Oklahoma's Music Conference & Festival.

Diversafest (Dfest), Oklahoma's Music Conference and Festival, was an annual live event that showcased independent and emerging artists and hosted educational music industry panels and a tradeshow. Dfest took place the last weekend in July in the historic Blue Dome District of Tulsa, Oklahoma. The music conference and festival had the purpose of promoting and empowering emerging artists from around the United States. By 2008, Dfest had grown to include more than 140 bands performing on over 10 stages in downtown Tulsa and featuring music industry panels, clinics and a tradeshow during the days at the host conference hotel. Attendance over the two-day event in 2009, was nearly 70,000. However, the 2010 festival was cancelled.

== Festival ==
The first Dfest took place in 2002. 12 local bands played for a crowd of roughly 150 people. Growing steadily each year, there were 22 showcasing acts in 2003, 65 in 2004, 96 in 2005, and 108 artists of 20 different genres playing for 16,000 fans in 2006. In 2007, the location was moved from 18th and Boston to the Blue Dome District in downtown Tulsa. This location was more conducive to the multi-venue format Dfest had evolved into. The Blue Dome District also featured a large, centrally located parking lot where The Flaming Lips, Leon Russell and Amos Lee played for more than 15,000 enthusiastic fans in 2007. All told, Dfest 2007 would feature over 130 acts on 13 stages with approximately 40,000 people attending over two days. In 2008, the festival grew even larger, featuring festival stages in the PAC parking lot where The Disco Biscuits, Moe, Ghostland Observatory, Clutch, and Helmet played to huge crowds in excess of 5,000 and the Santa Fe lot where Edison Glass, Phantom Planet, Paramore, The All-American Rejects, Jacob Fred Jazz Odyssey, Zappa Plays Zappa, and The Roots played to music fans that exceeded 15,000. Overall, the 2008 event featured over 140 acts and attendance over the two-day event in excess of 60,000 festival-goers. 2009 is expected to be the best Dfest yet.

Notable acts featured at Dfest have included: Adam Hood, The All-American Rejects, Amos Lee, The Apples in Stereo, Bassnectar, The Black Crowes, Black Stone Cherry, Blue October, Cake, Carney, Citizen Cope, The Cool Kids, Clutch, Damone, Daphne Loves Derby, Delta Spirit, Dengue Fever, The Disco Biscuits, Dub Trio, Edison Glass, Evangelicals, Fair To Midland, The Flaming Lips, The Format, Gil Mantera's Party Dream, Gogol Bordello, Ghostland Observatory, Helmet, The Honorary Title, Jacob Fred Jazz Odyssey, The Knux, Leon Russell, Limbeck, Lovedrug, Mates of State, Metro Station, MC Chris, moe., Other Lives, Ozomatli, Paramore, Phantom Planet, Ra Ra Riot, Rooney, The Roots, Motive for Movement, Sherwood, Shiny Toy Guns, Steel Train, Starlight Mints, The Veils and Zappa plays Zappa.

== Conference ==
Dfest 2004, was the first year to feature music industry panels. All showcasing artists were invited to attend these panels featuring music industry professionals speaking candidly about getting ahead in the business. In 2005, panels were extended to two days, and covered a variety of topics including record deals, touring, marketing and recording. 2005 also featured guitar and bass clinics, as well as demo listening sessions.

The 2006, Dfest Music Conference grew in size and scale. It moved to the Downtown Doubletree Hotel which allowed for more room than previous locations. The keynote speaker in 2006 was Scott Booker, manager of The Flaming Lips. It featured a tradeshow with 21 exhibitors, a bass clinic by Billy Sheehan, a guitar clinic by Ravi, demo listening sessions, and one-on-one artist mentoring. The conference was very well attended, with over 800 registrants.

The conference continued to grow in 2007 and 2008. In 2007, the keynote speaker was Ken Abdo, of the Grammy Foundation, and there was a much-hyped "couch interview" with Wayne Coyne, frontman of The Flaming Lips. A drum clinic featuring Will Calhoun of Living Colour was a hit and the tradeshow was home to 25 exhibitors.

In 2008, the keynote speaker was Martin Atkins, best known for his work in post-punk and industrial groups including Public Image Ltd., Ministry, Pigface and Killing Joke. He also wrote the indie band Bible, "Tour Smart and Break the Band." The conference host hotel also moved to the Downtown Crowne Plaza Hotel which added convenience being literally less than a block from the festival site in the Blue Dome District.

== 2011 ==
While Dfest was put on "hiatus" for the year, organizers have not announced any plans for a return in 2011.

On May 4, 2011, Cain's Ballroom announced the inaugural Brady District Block Party which will be a one-day festival featuring The Twenties, The Flaming Lips, Primus, Mutemath, Civil Twilight, Awolnation, Solid Gold, Particle, That 1 Guy, and The Pretty Black Chains. The festival takes place on August 6, 2011 and is assumed to replace DFest.

== 2010 ==
Dfest 2010 was originally scheduled for July 30–31, 2010, but in late May the organizers announced that the festival was on "hiatus" for the year. They cited economic problems, rising costs, and a decline in sponsorships as reasons for the cancellation.

== 2009 ==
Dfest 2009 took place on July 24–25, 2009 in the Blue Dome District, Tulsa OK. Approximately 164 bands made an appearance.

The First round of artists was announced at a press conference in Downtown Tulsa on April 21, 2009.

Showcasing Artists

Friday July 24

Friday July 24
| Poseidon Stage | Triton Stage |
| The Black Crowes; Citizen Cope; Delta Spirit; Carney; Other Lives | Gogol Bordello; Ozomatli; Dengue Fever; Dusty Rhodes and the River Band |

Other Venues

IDL Ballroom: Here II Here, Gil Mantera's Party Dream, Crocodile, Joe Pug, Daniel Walcher

Temple: DJ Rekha, Elliot Poston, R.C., Jeff Haze, Heady P

Dirty's Tavern: Ganem, Taddy Porter, I Said Stop!, Ian Moore, Jonathan Tyler and the Northern Lights, Manda Mosher, Greg Reichel

Flytrap Music Hall: Jade, Rainbows Are Free, Dub Trio, Vangough, The Culprit, Inside Light, Exit 380

Other: X-Cal, 8bit Cynics, Sidewayz, Kawnar, Ivan Ives, SocietySociety, Navigator, Hold Em High, Canja Rave, Lynhurst, The City Lives, Negative Space, Odis, Oso Closo, Hush Hush Commotion, The Boom Bang, Stevedore, Unwed Sailor, The Burning Hotels, Callupsie, The Pretty Black Chains, Junebug Spade, Ptaridactyl, The Nghiems, Tkatz & The Goods, Astellaway, The Romantic Disaster, The Blooms, GHOSTS, The Moai Broadcast, The Jonbear Fourtet, Western Heritage, Tim Miller, Ziff, Blue Island Tribe, Bald Eagle, Brine Webb, Carter Sampson, Derek Blankenship, Maggie McClure, Chris McLeod, Matt Powers, Kelsey Humphreys, Alyse Black, Van Risseghem, Ben Kilgore

Saturday July 25

Saturday July 25
| Poseidon Stage | Triton Stage |
| Cake; Blue October; Rooney; Mates of State; The Uglysuit | Bassnectar; Metro Station; The Cool Kids; Ra Ra Riot; The Knux |

Other Venues

IDL Ballroom: Dusty Rhodes & The River Band (2nd Show), Gringo Star, Muchos Backflips, Vandevander, Gentleman Auction House, The Calm Blue Sea

Temple: DJ Bill Hamel, Turk, Demko, Derek James, Sean Kibble

Dirty's Tavern: Steve Pryor, Broke City, Damn Bullets, Goodbye to Pretty, Miniver Cheevy, The Round Up Boys, Three Penny Upright

Flytrap Music Hall: Sam & The Stylees, Big Red Rooster, Danny Chaimson & The 11th Hour, Peach Truck Republic, Dirtfoot, Proprietors of the Earth, People

Other: Adam’s Attic, Alex & The Anders, Ali Harter, Approaching August, Avian X, Based on a True Story (Derek Blankenship), Billy Joe Winghead, CoCo Jones, Colourmusic, Dante & The Hawks, Dead Sea Choir, Deas Vail, Dignan, Eric and The Adams, Erin Austin, Head Over Hills, Hollow, Jabee, Johnny Polygon, Marcy Priest, Mayola, Modern Science, Motive for Movement, My Solstice, Native Lights, Oblio, P.D.A., Paul Benjaman Band, Pico vs. Island Trees, Ptaridactyl, Recorder, Roger Jaeger, Ryan Lindsey, Scott Goldman, Spencer Sharpe, Stars Go Dim, The Dawson Project, The Fiascos, The Nightlife, The Pons, The Taking State, Velos Maretha, Welcome The Silence, Without Trees

== 2008 ==
Dfest 2008 was held July 25–26, 2008 in the Blue Dome District, Tulsa OK.

Showcasing Artists

Friday July 25

Friday July 25
| Main Stage | 2nd Stage |
| The All American Rejects; Paramore; Phantom Planet; Edison Glass; Congress of a Crow; The City Lives | The Disco Biscuits; Ghostland Observatory moe. Ty England; Sam & The Stylees; Ravi |

Saturday July 26

Saturday July 26
| Main Stage | 2nd Stage |
| The Roots; The Twenties Zappa Plays Zappa; Jacob Fred Jazz Odyssey; The Effects; AM; Eventful Winner | Clutch; Helmet; Colourmusic; Sworn Against; Rainbows Are Free; Mercy Street |

Other Performers The Apples In Stereo, 20%, 40engine, Acoustic Ross, Adam's Attic, Admiral Twin, Alex Winston, American Taxi, Angela Ortiz, Astellaway, Bait, Bangalore, Beau Jennings, BEN.BEN., Benji Kay, Black Swan, Black Wednesday, Blake-O, Blowing Trees, Born A Number, Brice Woodall, Bricolage, Callupsie, Carter Sampson, Cat-a-tac, Cavedoll, Cecada, Cheyenne, Cheryl B. Engelhardt, Chris McLeod, City Riots, Colourmusic, Congress of a Crow, Crocodile, Crooked X, Dance Robots Dance/Trash Yourself, Deas Vail, Dick Sims Project, Drag The River, El Paso Hot Button, Ernie Halter, Galapogos, Ganem, Gentlemen Auction House, Ghosts, Ghost of Monkshood, Glister, Gravity Propulsion System, Greg Reichel, Hazzard, Here Is There, Hey Hollywood, Hush Hush Commotion, I Said Stop!, Jabee, Jayne Doe, Jeremy Buck & The Bang, Jesse Aycock, John Moreland & Black Gold Band, Kawnar, Kendal Dean, Klondike5, Leopold and his Fiction, Lords of the Fjords, Love In October, Mama Sweet, Mando Saenz, Matt Stansberry Band, Maxtone Four, Mayola, Miniver Cheevy, Modern Rock Diaries, Motive for Movement, My Solstice, Noush Skaugen, The Non, Odis, Of god and science, Oxygen, PDA, Progress In Color, Quiet Company, Recorder, Red Dirt Rangers, Ruthie Bram, Ryan Lindsey, Salute, Sam and The Stylees, Samantha Crain & The Midnight Shivers, Scott Goldman, Sherree Chamberlain, Sir Threadius Mongus, Sleeperstar, Slorder, Soulfege, Sparky Quano, Stanley Maxwell, Stars Go Dim, State Bird, Stop, Revolt, Taddy Porter, Tech Tonic, The Abdomen, The Benjamin Banneker Band, The Boxing Lesson, The Brandon Clark Band, The City Lives, The Compulsions, The Cringe, The Decomposed, The Feed, The Forms, The Heyday, The Oh! Johnny Girls, The Starkweather Boys, The Stockmarket Crash, The Twenties, The Uglysuit, Three Penny Upright, Vandevander, Vangough, Vannadine

Conference Panelists

- Ken Abdo, Lommen Abdo Law Firm
- Stephanie Adwar, Furgang Adwar
- Tom Alexander, AEG Live
- AM, Artist
- Holly Anderson, Eventful
- Martin Atkins, Ministry, Nine Inch Nails
- Daryl Berg, FuelTV
- Jonathan Belzley, Mastering Engineer
- David Codr, micspace.com
- Mia Crow, Visionworks Music
- Jon Delange, Tinderbox Music
- Dan Efram, The Musebox, Tractor Beam Management
- Damian Elahi, Interscope, Geffen, A&M/Universal
- Erica Forster, YSK Entertainment / Extasy Recording Studio
- Jim Halsey, The Jim Halsey Co.
- Carrie Hughes, MTV / Reflection Music
- Chris Jackson, Comcast Entertainment Group
- Jeff Jones, Drum World
- Paul Kriegler, 94.1 The Sound
- Keith Lacock, Tinderbox Music
- Justin Levenson, SESAC
- Catherine Lieu, Eventful
- Mike Locke, Rhino Independent
- Max Luces-Tucker, Bunim/Murray Productions
- Mollie Moore, Atlantic Records
- Shawn Murphy, ASCAP
- John Nicolson, Hollywood Records
- Scott Perry, The New Music Tipsheet
- David Ponak, Rhino Entertainment
- Eavan Porter, Nettwerk Management
- David Preston, BMI
- Ravi, Artist/Clinician
- Steve Robertson, Atlantic Records
- Joe Rudge, Search Party Music
- Jeff Scheel, Gravity Kills
- Jon Schroeder, Producer / Engineer
- Jack Shapira, Unison Studios
- Wil Sharpe, Sharpe Entertainment Services
- Madalyn Sklar, GoGirlsMusic
- Robert Spinelli, Bodog Music
- Ben Tedder, Drum World
- David Teegarden, Producer / Engineer
- Larry White, Larry White Management

== 2007 ==
Dfest 2007 took place July 27–28, 2007 in the Blue Dome District, Tulsa OK.

Showcasing Artists

Friday July 27
| Main Stage | 2nd Stage |
| The Flaming Lips; Stardeath and White Dwarfs; Colourmusic | Shiny Toy Guns; Love in October; Stevedore; The Stock Market Crash; Fresh Sunday |

Saturday July 28
| Main Stage | 2nd Stage |
| Amos Lee; Leon Russell; David Skinner; John Moreland & The Black Gold Band | The Format; The Vanished; The Pearls; Cody Clinton and the Bishops; Refuje |

Other Acts

2AM, 3rd Flow, AbsentStar, Adam Hood, Adam Lopez Trio, Admiral Twin, Albert Aguilar, Ali Harter, AM, Animate Objects, Aranda, Aster, AutoVaughn, Autumn Shade, BangBangBang, Barefoot, Beau Charron, Billy Joe Winghead, Black Stone Cherry, Brandon Clark, Brandon Hart, Bryan Jewett, Carrie Webber, Casey Desmond, Catchpenny, Charlie Cheney, Charlie Scott & The Salty Dawgs, Christopher Wray Quartet, Christy Clayton, Citizen Mundi, Cody Clinton and the Bishops, Congress of a Crow, Crazy James, Crocodile, Crooked X, Dance Robots, Dance!, Dangerous Rob, Da-rel Junior, Dios (Malos), Dirtfoot, Dorian Small, Dustin Pittsley, El Paso Hot Button, Elliott the Letter Ostrich, Elza, Erin Austin, Evangelicals Fatback Circus, First Lady Assassins, Forty Minutes of Hell, Fresh Sunday, Ganem, GHOSTS, Ghost of Monkshood, Green Lemon, Hannah Blaylock & Edens Edge, HipHopotamus, Hundred Year Storm, Hush Hush, Commotion, Hymns, Indicator/Activator, Jacob Fred Jazz Odyssey, Jacob Ide, Jessa Zapor, Jesse Aycock, Jiraff, John Hendrix, Judson Layne, KC Clifford, Kelli Lynn & The Skillet Lickers, Kevin Welch, Klipspringer, Kunek, Limbeck, Love in October, Ludo, Luma, Mayola, MC Chris, Minutes Too Far, Monta At Odds, My Dead X, My Solstice, On A Sun, Patrick Lentz, PDA, People Noise, Pike, Plague of Prophets, RadioRadio, Red City Radio, Red Headed Stepchildren, Refuje, ROOK, Ryan Lindsey, Sam and the Sylees, Seis Pistos, Sharla Pember, Sheree Chamberlain Band, Shiny Toy Guns, Sho-Nuf, Soular, South 40, Steel Train, Steve Liddell Band, Stevedore Student Film, Tammany Hall Machine, Teaneck, Ten Feet Tall, The Angel/Devil, The Doldrums, The Effects, The Everyday People, The Feds, The Format, The Hard Truth, The Hero Factor, The Honorary Title, The Ladybug Transistor, The Legend of Jr. Sapp, The NON, The Pearls, The Randies, The Rounders, The Starkeather Boys, Starlight Mints, The Stock Market Crash, The Urban Sophisticates, The Vanished, The Veils, Tigereye Lily, TJ McFarland, Torch, Tranny, Travis Kidd, True North Country, Upside, US Pipe & The Balls Dance Machine, Wade Burrow, Wendy Nichol, Winter Circle

Conference Panelists

- Ken Abdo - Grammy Foundation
- Stephanie Adwar - Attorney
- Craig Alvin - Producer/Engineer
- AM - Artist
- Ricardo Baca - Denver Post
- Trent Bell - Bell Labs
- Scott Booker - Great Society/World's Fair
- Will Calhoun - Living Colour
- Neil Citron- Favored Nations Records
- Dave Codr - The Music Phone Book
- Wayne Coyne - Flaming Lips
- Brian W. Cupp - Realtor
- John DeLange - Tinderbox
- Damian Elahi - Universal/Geffen/Interscope
- Elza - Artist
- Stephen Egerton - Armstrong Recording, The Descendents
- Jason Feinberg - OnTarget Media
- Erica Forster - Warner Music Group/Rhino
- Shane Germane - SoundExchange
- Dameon Guess - Jakprints
- Jim Halsey - The Halsey Institute
- Lynn Hernandez - KMOD-FM
- Dave Katznelson -Birdman Records
- Ryan Kuper - Boundless Entertainment
- Karen Lee - Evolution Promotion, WEA, Elektra
- Zac Maloy - Producer/Songwriter
- Suhrid Manchanda - World's Fair
- Ben McLane - Entertainment Attorney
- Zach Mullinax - Variety Artists
- Jeff Price - TuneCore, SpinArt Records
- Brad Rains - Windswept Pacific
- Ravi - Artistic Integrity
- David Silbaugh - Summerfest
- Jeff Smith-Crash Avenue Publicist
- Brian Waymire - DreamScapers International
- Kevin Welch - Performer/Songwriter
- Larry White - Manager
- Michael Wittig - Pillar
- Mark Wolfson - Reel Entertainment

== 2006 ==
Dfest 2006 took place July 7&8, in the 18th & Boston District, Tulsa OK

Showcasing Artists

Adam Lopez, Addictive Behavior, Aftereight, After The Tragedy, Ali Harter, Beau Bristow, Ben Rector, Brett Armstrong, Calling Matthew, Celeste, Charlie 6th Avenue, Chase Missy, Citizen Mundi, CoCo Jones, Colourmusic, Congress Of A Crow, Cottrell Gantt, Crooked X, Curtis Peoples, Damone, Deacon, DJ Demko, DJ Drumaddic, DJ Moody, DJ Robbo & Lynn K, Dolce, Down For Five, Edison Glass, Ephraim, Evangelicals, Failsafe, Fighting Tomorrow, Flint Blade, Forty Minutes of Hell, Ghost of Monkshood, Glo Soul, Gooding Harmonious Monk, High Profile, Hit By A Bus, Idlefill, Ism, Jenn Franklin, Jennifer Marriott & Odd Sheep Out, Joesf Glaude, Julian B (aka Sugarloaf Watson), Katrina Parker, Klipspringer, Kristin-Allen Zito, Kunek, Malcolm Palmer, Manifest Frequency, Math Lab, Matt Stansberry Band, Meta, Minority, Minutes Too Far, MWK, My-Tea Kind, Neverset, Nick Pags, Nick Smith, Pinebox Serenade, Radiant, RadioRadio, REConcile, Red Ecco, River City Ransom, Rsun, Ryan Young, Sam & The Stylees, Seis Pistos, Shaking Tree, Shannon Thomas, Shanti, Shaolin Death Squad, Sharaab, Shawn Nelson & The Ramblers, Shonuff, Sly Dawg, Squint, Stevedore, Steve Liddell, Student Film, Sugar Free Allstars, Superstring, Temple of Heads, Theory, The Avenjahs, The Dustin Pittsley Band, The Effects, The Ethereal Plane, The Everyday People, The Fine Lines, The Greatest Fear, The Hero Factor, The Jazzwholes, The Manic State, The Mudville Project, The Separation, The Trampolines, The Weeping Tree, TJ McFarland, Traveler, Travis Kidd, Upside, Voodoo Blue, Winter Circle.

Conference Panelists

- Stephanie Adwar – Furgang & Adwar, LLP
- M. Sean Agnew - Blue Metallic Entertainment Group
- Blake Althen - Human Factor
- Joei Alvarez - Cherry Lane Publishing
- Kevin Arnold - IODA
- Ricardo Baca - Denver Post
- Charlie Cheney - Indie Office Manager
- Neil Citron - Favored Nations Records
- David Codr - Independent Artist Registry/The Music Phone Book
- David Cool - Stand Alone Records
- Terry Coughlin - hardcoremarketing.com
- Jon DeLange - Tinderbox Music
- Stephen Egerton - Armstrong Recording, The Descendents
- Matt Fecher - South Park Music Festival
- Jason Feinberg - On Target Media
- Rory Felton - The Militia Group
- Shane German - SoundExchange
- Suzanne Glass - Indie-Music.com
- Maria Gonzales - Warner Music Group
- Bryce Graves - Groupietunes
- Jim Halsey - Halsey Learning Center
- Dirk Hemsath - Doghouse Records
- Ronnie Hylton - First Born Productions
- Ryan Kuper - Redemption Recordings, Boundless Entertainment
- Panos Panay - SonicBids
- Jeff Price - spinART Records, TuneCore
- Ravi - Artistic Integrity
- Dave Richards - Clickpop Records
- Doug Roberts - Apple
- Jeff Scheel - Gravity Kills
- Daylle Deanna Schwartz - Author
- Allison Shaw - Hyperactive Music Magazine
- Billy Sheehan - Bass clinician
- Neil Sheehan - hardcoremarketing.com, Rust Records
- Madalyn Sklar - GoGirlsMusic.com
- Bubba Turner - Headliner Artists
- Paul Turpin - Clickpop Records
- Brian Waymire - Dreamscapers International
- Brooke Wentz - The Rights Workshop
- Ryan Williams - Author
- Mark Wolfson - Playtone Records
- Billy Zero - XM Satellite Radio

== 2003 ==
There were twenty-two bands showcased in 2003. Some of the twenty-two bands included in the 2003 showcase included Pinkard and Ultrafix on both indoor and outdoor stages in Tulsa's Art District.

== 2002 ==
Dfest 2002 took place in July in Tulsa OK. It was founded by TJ Green and Angie Devore-Green of the band Ultrafix. The show was originally planned to be on an outside stage behind a local bar, but due to a thunderstorm and fear of equipment at risk of being damaged from the water, the show moved inside the bar changing it from an all ages event to 21+.

Showcasing Artists Though incomplete, some of the original twelve bands booked for the first DFest are as follows: Strüb, Ultrafix.

== See also ==
- List of festivals in the United States
- Tulsa, Oklahoma
- Neighborhoods of Tulsa, Oklahoma
- Indie Music Scenes
- Music festival
- Rock festival
