= Motive for Movement =

- Origin: Tulsa, Oklahoma, USA
- Genres: Indie rock Post-punk; New Prog; Indie-pop alternative rock
- Years active: 2005–2011
- Members: Deric Williams-Vocals/Guitar/Keys; Tobie Munroe-Guitar (Bass 2005-2007); Daniel Clark-Drums; Chris Davis-Bass (2007-2011); Adam Nichols Vocals/Guitar (2005-2007)
- Website: motiveformovement.com

Motive for Movement was a Tulsa, Oklahoma indie rock band that formed in 2005. The band consisted of the 4 members now known as Foreign Home. The band has gone through many style shifts since 2005 but consistently combines angular guitar and syncopated drums for a style often described as ambient shoegazing indie rock with Britpop melodic sensibilities.

== Played With ==
- Copeland (band) (Tooth & Nail Records)
- Sparta (band) (Hollywood Records)
- Eagles of Death Metal
- Edison Glass (Credential Recordings)
- Dear and the Headlights (Equal Vision)
- Project 86 (Tooth & Nail Records)
- Showbread (Tooth & Nail Records)
- Inhale Exhale (Solid State Records)
- Vedera (Epic Records)
- The Ataris
- Capital Lights (Tooth & Nail Records)
- Umbrellas (band) (The Militia Group)
- Blinded Black (SideCho Records)
- Deas Vail (Mono Vs Stereo)
- Between the Trees (The Universal Motown/Universal Republic Group)
- Unwed Sailor (Burnt Toast Vinyl)
- Minutes Too Far (Doghouse Records)
- Hundred Year Storm (Floodgate)
- Other Lives (band) (TBD Records)
- Treaty of Paris (band)
- Eleventyseven (Gotee Records)
- The Valley Arena
- Meese (Atlantic Records)
- Le Meu Le Purr (TVT Records)
- Desole (Abacus Records)
- The Hanks
- The Forecast (Eyeball Records)
- PM Today (Rise Records)

=== Festivals ===
Diversafest 2008 with:

- Paramore (Fueled by Ramen)
- Phantom Planet (Fueled by Ramen)
- The Roots (MCA Records)
- Zappa Plays Zappa
- Ghostland Observatory
- Helmet
- Clutch
- The All-American Rejects (Interscope Records)
- The Disco Biscuits
- The Apples In Stereo (Simian)
- moe.
- Admiral Twin

Diversafest 2009 with:

- The Black Crows
- Cake (band)
- Rooney (band)
- The Cool Kids
- Ozomatli
- Metro Station (Columbia)
- Blue October (Universal Records)
- Other Lives (band) (TBD Records)
- Ra Ra Riot
- Delta Spirit
- Citizen Cope
- The Uglysuit
- Gogol Bordello
