= Music of Oklahoma =

While the music of Oklahoma is relatively young — Oklahoma was admitted to the Union 119 years ago — the state has had a long history and many musicians.

== Songs of Oklahoma ==
=== Official state songs ===
- Official state song: (adopted in 1953)
  - "Oklahoma!", Rodgers & Hammerstein
- Official state waltz: (adopted in 1982)
  - "Oklahoma Wind", written by Dale J. Smith.
- Official state country and western song: (adopted in 1988)
  - "Faded Love", Bob Wills/Billy Jack Wills
- Official state children's song: (adopted in 1996)
  - "Oklahoma, My Native Land", Martha Kemm Barrett
- Official state folk song: (adopted in 2001)
  - "Oklahoma Hills", Woody Guthrie/Jack Guthrie
- Official state rock song: (adopted in 2009, designation removed 2011)
  - "Do You Realize??", Flaming Lips
- Official state gospel song: (adopted in 2011)
  - "Swing Low, Sweet Chariot", Wallace Willis

=== Other songs ===
- "Does That Wind Still Blow In Oklahoma" — Reba McEntire & Ronnie Dunn
- "The Everlasting Hills of Oklahoma" — Tim Spencer and the Sons of the Pioneers
- "For Oklahoma, I'm Yearning" — Wava White/Jack Guthrie
- "The Gal From Oklahoma" — Junior Brown
- "Good Old Oklahoma" — Bob Wills and The Texas Playboys
- "Home In Oklahoma" — Jack Elliott for Roy Rogers and the Sons of the Pioneers
- "Home, Sweet Oklahoma" — Tom Paxton
- "Home Sweet Oklahoma" - Leon Russell
- "If You're Ever In Oklahoma" - J. J. Cale
- "In Oklahoma" - Choya Partridge
- "Loves In Oklahoma" — Jason Eklund
- "My City From The O" — Jesse Dalton
- "My Oklahoma" — Terrye Newkirk
- "My Oklahoma Home" – Sis Cunningham, recorded most famously by Pete Seeger and on a Seeger tribute CD by Bruce Springsteen.
- "Okie from Muskogee" — Merle Haggard
- "Oklahoma Blue" - The Damn Quails
- "Oklahoma Borderline" — Vince Gill
- "Oklahoma Breakdown" — Hosty Duo
- "Oklahoma Girl" — Eli Young Band
- "Oklahoma Hills" — co-written by Jack Guthrie and Woody Guthrie, recorded first by Jack, then by many others, including Hank Thompson and James Talley
- "Oklahoma Rag" — Bob Wills and The Texas Playboys
- "Oklahoma Stomp" — Duke Ellington
- "Oklahoma Sunshine" — Waylon Jennings
- "Oklahoma Swing" — Vince Gill with Reba McEntire
- "Rough Wind In Oklahoma" — Michael Hedges
- "Soft Winds Of Oklahoma" — Bill Emerson
- "Take Me Back To Tulsa" — Bob Wills/Tommy Duncan. Later recorded by Hank Thompson, Merle Haggard, Lester Flatt and Earl Scruggs, Asleep at the Wheel, and George Strait.
- "Tell Me Something Bad About Tulsa" — written by Red Lane, recorded by Merle Haggard, Noel Haggard, and then George Strait (2003)
- "Tulsa" — Wayne Hancock
- "Tulsa" — Eric Himan
- "Tulsa" — Rufus Wainwright
- "T-U-L-S-A Straight Ahead" — Leon McAuliffe, Asleep at the Wheel, Jason Robert
- "Tulsa Time" — Don Williams
- "24 Hours From Tulsa" — Gene Pitney; written by Burt Bacharach and Hal David, 1963.
- "You're the Reason God Made Oklahoma" — David Frizzell & Shelly West

For a more complete list, see the Wikipedia "List of songs about Oklahoma".

== Categories ==
=== Indigenous music ===
Oklahoma is the traditional homeland of the Caddo, Wichita, and Tonkawa peoples. The US federal government's Indian Removal policy of the 19th century moved many other tribes into the area, and now the state is headquarters to 40 federally recognized tribes. Oklahoma is diverse crossroads of Native American musicians. This rich collection of traditional music is performed in powwows all over the state. Additionally, the music is enriched by Indian musicians' exposure to other tribe's songs through the many intertribal meetings in the state. The American Indian Exposition in Anadarko is a longstanding gathering of Southern Plains Tribes featuring many musicians. Among Eastern tribes, stomp dances feature male singers with accompaniment by women's turtle shell leg rattles.

49 songs, a 20th-century genre based on traditional war dance songs, originated in Oklahoma among the Kiowa tribe in southwestern Oklahoma and quickly spread to other tribes through the American Indian Exposition at Anadarko. The name comes from a burlesque show that toured the area in the 1920s called the "Girls of '49" for its California Gold Rush theme. A 49 (or forty-nine) is a gathering following a pow-wow and the songs are usually love songs, mostly in English, with repeated refrains of vocables.

=== Barbershop ===
The Barbershop Harmony Society's Southwestern District includes Oklahoma, with several barbershop chapters across the state. In 1999, the Music Central chorus from Oklahoma City competed internationally, ranking among the top twenty. Sweet Adelines International has several women's choruses across Oklahoma within its Heart of America region. Both of these international singing organizations were founded in Tulsa, Oklahoma.

=== Country ===
The traditional Appalachian folk ballads brought by new settlers from the South infused Oklahoma with a music about the lives of everyday people. Much of the music was overtly religious as the rural communities revolved around their churches. Another distinctive type of country music grew out of the dance halls and roadhouses, especially in the oil boom areas of eastern Oklahoma. This honky-tonk style music from Oklahoma and the surrounding states became a staple of American country music for years.

=== Gospel ===
Oklahoma has had a long tradition of Gospel music. "Swing Low, Sweet Chariot" and "Steal Away To Jesus", standard Gospel tunes, were written by Wallis Willis, a former slave in the old Choctaw Nation of southeastern Oklahoma. Alexander Reid, a minister at a Choctaw boarding school after the Civil War, transcribed the words and melodies and sent the music to the Jubilee Singers of Fisk University in Nashville, Tennessee. The Jubilee Singers then popularized the songs during a tour of the United States and Europe. Albert E. Brumley, a Spiro, Oklahoma native, wrote a number of Gospel classics that have become a standard in Gospel singer's repertoires. His best-known compositions include "I'll Fly Away," "Jesus Hold My Hand," and "Turn Your Radio On." These songs are commonplace in many church hymnals today.

=== Jazz and swing ===
The territory bands of the 1920s and 30s brought a new style of music to Oklahoma. Many of the well-known swing musicians tuned their skills and styles touring with these regional bands. These bands brought the big-band orchestras to many communities never visited by the more popular groups from New York. Perhaps the most famous of the Oklahoma-based territory bands were the Oklahoma City Blue Devils. The Blue Devils were the foundation for Count Basie's orchestra. The Al Good Orchestra, also from Oklahoma City, began playing in the Oklahoma area in the 1940s and continue to play after Al Good's death in 2003. Bandleader Ada Leonard was born in Lawton. In addition, a number of prominent jazz musicians came from Oklahoma; these include Charlie Christian, Oscar Pettiford, Don Byas, Cecil McBee, Barney Kessel, Sam Rivers, Don Cherry, Chet Baker, Jimmy Rushing, Sunny Murray, and Jay McShann. Although most of these self-identified as African American, many (including Pettiford) were also partly of Native American ancestry.

=== R&B ===
R&B singer, drummer, and bandleader Roy Milton was born in Wynnewood. Guitarist and bandleader Jimmy Liggins was born in Newby. Pianist and vocalist Joe Liggins was born in Guthrie.

=== Rock and roll ===
One of the hot spots for rock and roll in Oklahoma during the 60's was Ronnie Kaye's "The Scene" in Oklahoma City. It featured local garage rock and psychedelic bands. Musicians such as songwriter J. J. Cale, Elvin Bishop, and Leon Russell have ties to Tulsa, Oklahoma (see The Tulsa Sound), and Tulsa's Cain's Ballroom has become a notable small-venue club for touring bands. After the success of cult icons The Flaming Lips, under-the-radar act Starlight Mints, and 90's alternative groups Chainsaw Kittens and The Nixons, Norman has become a hotspot for local and nationwide indie music. Pop-rock band Hanson, who had a string of hits in the mid-90s, hails from Tulsa; as do Admiral Twin, and Caroline's Spine. Alternative-rock band The All-American Rejects was formed in Stillwater; and post-grunge band Hinder, notable for their hit "Lips of an Angel" hails from Oklahoma City. The Joe Pajaree Project noted for many compositions with a Holiday theme. The 1990s had a Hardcore Punk Rock scene in Edmond, Oklahoma which included bands such as The Lunch Bunch, Blaster, The Real Ones, Bi-Products, Aspects, Suburban Bitches, Dry Heave, The Takers, The Boxcar Children, and many more who played shows at the Edmond Legion Hall, the Edmond Armory, The Outback, Hafer Park and The Sheep Farm. Other notable new acts include COAT, Strawberry 66, and The Likewise sound, revitalizing the same energy as the 90's.

=== Western or cowboy ===
Prior to Oklahoma's opening for settlement, cowboys pushing cattle from Texas to the railheads developed a style and subject of music that became known as Cowboy or Western. As they settled on the ranches they continued their traditional style of singing. The romanticism of the cowboy in the popular culture brought a wider audience to the music. Although the writers of these traditional Western songs are mostly unknown, Dr. Brewster Highley, author of perhaps the most famous of the cowboy ballads, "Home on the Range", followed the frontier into Oklahoma where he died in 1911.

Otto Gray and his Oklahoma Cowboys were the first nationally popular cowboy band. Formed in 1924 by William McGinty, Oklahoma pioneer and former Rough Rider, the band performed on radio and national vaudeville circuits from 1924 through 1936. Otto Gray, the first singing cowboy, and all of the band members were recruited from Oklahoma ranches.

=== Western Swing ===
Oklahoma was a center for the development and spread of Western swing. Performers playing the traditional western music, influenced heavily by the territory bands, added fiddles and steel guitars to their orchestras to produce a new and very popular type of music. Bob Wills, and His Texas Playboys, based in Tulsa, influenced this music for more than a generation. One of the more distinctive early Western swing bands from Oklahoma was Big Chief Henry's Indian String Band, a family group of Choctaw Indians, who performed out of Wichita, Kansas, during the 1920s, and who were recorded by H. C. Speir of Victor Records in 1929. Bob Dunn was a pioneer steel guitarist born in Beggs.

== Radio ==
In 1922, WKY began broadcasting in Oklahoma City. Other stations followed and soon, anyone with a radio could hear music previously unavailable to them. Still, many radios broadcast local music. KVOO in Tulsa aired Western swing from Bob Wills for more than twenty years.

In 1958, KOMA, a 50,000 watt radio station in Oklahoma City, began a format of playing Top 40 recordings and Rock & Roll. Its signal strength allowed many young people across the Great Plains and Western states to listen to music not available from their local stations and influenced many of their local music markets.

Oklahoma currently supports many radio stations. Most play music that ranges from classical to hip-hop. Much of their content, however, is taped and the same programs broadcast over several stations throughout the U.S. Very little local music is aired. (See List of radio stations in Oklahoma)

== Musicians and composers native to Oklahoma ==
- Yeshua Anderson, Ada, Oklahoma (The Likewise Sound)
- Fletcher Stone, Oklahoma City, Oklahoma (The Likewise Sound)
- Brother Painter, Anadarko, Oklahoma (The Likewise Sound and Mescal Bears)
- Joe Pajaree, Clinton, Oklahoma
- AM, Tulsa, Oklahoma
- Blake Shelton, Ada, Oklahoma
- Keith Anderson, Miami, Oklahoma
- Hoyt Axton, Duncan, Oklahoma
- Chet Baker, Yale, Oklahoma
- Maxayn Lewis, Tulsa, Oklahoma
- Louis W. Ballard (1931–2007), composer from Quapaw, Oklahoma
- Byron Berline, raised in Northern Oklahoma, now in Guthrie, Oklahoma
- Johnny Bond, Enville, Oklahoma
- Charlie Wilson, Tulsa, Oklahoma
- Garth Brooks, Tulsa, Oklahoma
- Carrie Underwood, Checotah, Oklahoma
- Anita Bryant, Barnsdall, Oklahoma
- J. J. Cale, Oklahoma City, Oklahoma
- Henson Cargill, Oklahoma City, Oklahoma
- Kellie Coffey, Moore, Oklahoma
- Spade Cooley, Grand, Oklahoma
- Samantha Crain, Shawnee, Oklahoma
- Edgar Cruz , Oklahoma City, Oklahoma
- Karen Dalton, Enid, Oklahoma
- Jesse Ed Davis, Norman, Oklahoma
- Joe Diffie, Velma, Oklahoma
- Katrina Elam, Bray, Oklahoma
- Ty England, Oklahoma City, Oklahoma
- Ernie Fields, Tulsa, Oklahoma
- Lowell Fulson, Tulsa, Oklahoma
- David Gates of Bread, Tulsa, Oklahoma
- Vince Gill, Norman, Oklahoma
- Jack Guthrie, Olive, Oklahoma
- Woody Guthrie, Okemah, Oklahoma
- Roy Harris, Chandler, Oklahoma
- Wade Hayes, Bethel Acres, Oklahoma
- Lee Hazlewood, Mannford, Oklahoma
- Wanda Jackson, Maud, Oklahoma
- Norma Jean, Wellston, Oklahoma
- Toby Keith, Moore, Oklahoma
- Amy Kuney, Tulsa, Oklahoma
- Litefoot (b. 1969), rapper from Tulsa, Oklahoma
- Reba McEntire, McAlester, Oklahoma
- Barry McGuire, Oklahoma City, Oklahoma
- Jay McShann, Muskogee, Oklahoma
- Gary P. Nunn, Okmulgee, Oklahoma
- Patti Page, Claremore, Oklahoma
- Sandi Patty, Oklahoma City, Oklahoma
- Zenobia Powell Perry, Boley, Oklahoma
- Carl Radle, Tulsa, Oklahoma
- Sam Rivers, El Reno, Oklahoma
- Jimmy Rushing, Oklahoma City, Oklahoma
- Leon Russell, Lawton, Oklahoma
- Neal Schon, Tinker Air Force Base
- Eldon Shamblin, Clinton, Oklahoma
- Kay Starr, Dougherty, Oklahoma
- James Talley, Tulsa, Oklahoma
- B. J. Thomas, Hugo, Oklahoma
- Pinky Tomlin, Durant, Oklahoma
- Dwight Twilley, Tulsa, Oklahoma
- Jared Tyler, Tulsa, Oklahoma
- Jimmy Webb, Elk City, Oklahoma
- Sheb Wooley, Erick, Oklahoma
- Parker Millsap, Purcell, Oklahoma

== Notable Oklahoma bands ==
- COAT, Oklahoma City, Oklahoma
- Strawberry 66, Oklahoma City, Oklahoma
- The Likewise Sound, Oklahoma City, Oklahoma
- Admiral Twin, Tulsa, Oklahoma
- The All American Rejects, Stillwater, Oklahoma
- Aqueduct, Tulsa, Oklahoma
- Aranda, Oklahoma City, Oklahoma
- The Byron Berline Band, Guthrie, Oklahoma
- Caroline's Spine, Tulsa, Oklahoma
- Chainsaw Kittens, Norman, Oklahoma
- Chat Pile, Oklahoma City, Oklahoma
- Color Me Badd, Oklahoma City, Oklahoma
- Colourmusic, Stillwater, Oklahoma
- Cozad Singers, Anadarko, Oklahoma
- Cross Canadian Ragweed, Stillwater, Oklahoma
- Ester Drang, Broken Arrow, Oklahoma
- Evangelicals, Norman, Oklahoma
- The Flaming Lips, Oklahoma City, Oklahoma
- For Love Not Lisa, Oklahoma City, Oklahoma
- Hanson, Tulsa, Oklahoma
- Hinder, Norman, Oklahoma
- Gap Band, Tulsa, Oklahoma
- Jacob Fred Jazz Odyssey, Tulsa, Oklahoma
- Kings of Leon, Oklahoma City, Oklahoma
- Midwest Kings, Tulsa, Oklahoma
- The Nixons, Oklahoma City, Oklahoma
- Other Lives, Stillwater, Oklahoma
- Pillar, Tulsa, Oklahoma
- Taddy Porter, Stillwater, Oklahoma
- Safetysuit, Tulsa, Oklahoma
- Shiny Toy Guns, Shawnee, Oklahoma
- Starlight Mints, Norman, Oklahoma
- Swon Brothers, Muskogee, Oklahoma
- Turnpike Troubadours, Tahlequah, Oklahoma
- Umbrellas, Norman, Oklahoma

== Musicians and bands with Oklahoma ties ==
- Gene Autry, raised in Oklahoma, originally billed as Oklahoma's Yodeling Cowboy.
- Elvin Bishop, lived in Tulsa during his youth.
- Jason Boland & the Stragglers, formed in Stillwater, Oklahoma.
- The Call, lived in Oklahoma City.
- Bob Childers, raised in Ponca City, Oklahoma.
- Charlie Christian, raised in Oklahoma City.
- Roy Clark, based in Tulsa.
- Eddie Cochran, great early rocker, talked proudly of his parents' origins in Oklahoma.
- David Cook, based in Tulsa.
- Ronnie Dunn of Brooks & Dunn, raised in Tulsa.
- Steve and Cassie Gaines of the band Lynyrd Skynyrd grew up in the Miami, Oklahoma area.
- The Gap Band, formed in Tulsa.
- The Great Divide, based in Stillwater, Oklahoma.
- Merle Haggard, son of Dust Bowl immigrants from Oklahoma to California; their experience is reflected in his music.
- Michael Hedges, Pioneered percussive fingerstyle guitar, raised in Enid.
- Jimmy Hotz, Producer, Engineer, Musician and Inventor, lived in the Oklahoma City area in the late 70s and early 80s. Oklahoma Music Awards for "Best Producer" and "Best Engineer" in 1983.
- John Humphrey Drummer of the band Seether and former drummer of The Nixons raised in Moore, Oklahoma.
- Christian Kane of Kane raised in Norman, Oklahoma and attended University of Oklahoma.
- Jeff Keith, lead singer of the band Tesla, lived in Idabel, OK and attended Idabel High School.
- Jimmy LaFave, Stillwater, OK, now based in Austin, Texas
- Stoney LaRue, raised in rural southeastern Oklahoma, began music career in Stillwater, Oklahoma.
- Roger Miller, raised in Erick, Oklahoma.
- John Moreland, raised in Tulsa, Oklahoma.
- Jamie Oldaker, Carl Radle, Dick Sims of Tulsa, played back up for Eric Clapton on several famous Clapton compositions including "461 Ocean Blvd" and "Slowhand."
- Tom Paxton, raised in Bristow, Oklahoma, folk singer and songwriter. He is a graduate of the University of Oklahoma.
- Joe Don Rooney of Rascal Flatts, raised in Picher, Oklahoma.
- Eldon Shamblin, born in Clinton, Oklahoma, played guitar for many years with Bob Wills and Leon McAuliffe in Tulsa.
- Tim Spencer of the Sons of the Pioneers, raised in Picher, Oklahoma.
- Bartees Strange, raised in Mustang, Oklahoma.
- Geoff Tate Lead singer of the band Queensryche; when Geoff was growing up, he spent summers in Oklahoma at his father's home near Lawton.
- Ryan Tedder, of OneRepublic, born and raised in Tulsa and attended Oral Roberts University.
- Hank Thompson, broadcast the Hank Thompson Show from WKY in Oklahoma City. In 1973 Thompson opened the Hank Thompson School of Country Music, at what is now Rogers State University in Claremore, Oklahoma.
- Wayman Tisdale, raised in Tulsa. Known as a professional basketball player, Tisdale was also a noted musician.
- Watermelon Slim (Bill Homans), based in Stillwater, Oklahoma; graduate of Oklahoma State University
- Bob Wills, "King of Western Swing", based in Tulsa. He and his "Texas Playboys" broadcast their show on KVOO radio 1934-1958.
- The Joe Pajaree Project, based in Clinton, Oklahoma

== Oklahoma Music Archives ==
Founded in 2019, the Oklahoma Music Archives is a not-for-profit cultural website whose mission is to preserve the past, present, and future of Oklahoma's music culture. The archive is a database of current and past artists who are from Oklahoma or have strong ties to the state as well as albums released by those artists and biographies for individual musicians. Its database spans all genres and all decades, including any known artists predating statehood.

As a wiki, the website is dynamic and ever expanding with more articles of interest relating to the Oklahoma music scene, due in part to user input. It is the largest public database of musical artists and albums specific to Oklahoma and also has plans to expand to include venues and studios, historical and current, as well as provide resources to assist artists.

== Bibliography ==
- Dennis, Mildred. It's Gonna Be OK: A Lease-Child's Legacy. Bloomington, Indiana: AuthorHouse, 2004. ISBN 1-4208-0305-0
- Moore, Ethel, and Chauncey O. (compilers). Ballads and folk songs of the Southwest: more than 600 titles, melodies, and texts collected in Oklahoma. Norman: University of Oklahoma Press, 1964.
- Savage, William W., Jr. Singing Cowboys and All That Jazz: A Short History of Popular Music in Oklahoma. Norman: University of Oklahoma Press, 1988. ISBN 0-8061-2085-1
- Velie, Alan R. American Indian Literature: An Anthology. Norman: University of Oklahoma Press, 1999. ISBN 0-8061-2345-1

== See also ==
- Oklahoma Music Hall of Fame
