= Other Lives =

Other Lives may refer to:

- Other Lives (band), an American indie rock band
  - Other Lives (album), their 2009 debut album
- "Other Lives" (True Detective), an episode of the American television series True Detective
- "Other Lives" (audio drama), a Doctor Who audio drama
