= Rhythm 'N' Moves =

Studio album by Capital Lights
- Released: July 17, 2012
- Recorded: 2011
- Studio: Sand Springs, Oklahoma
- Genre: Christian rock, power pop, synthpop
- Length: 42:36
- Label: Tooth & Nail
- Producer: Capital Lights

Capital Lights chronology
This Is an Outrage! (2008)	Rhythm 'N' Moves (2012)

Rhythm 'N' Moves is the second and final studio album by the American Christian pop rock band Capital Lights. It was released on July 17, 2012, under Tooth & Nail Records.

The album was a product of Capital Lights returning from disbandment in late 2010.

== Background ==
On December 24, 2010, during an interview with RadioU's morning show The R!OT for their Christmas Eve session, lead singer Bryson Phillips announced on the behalf of the band that they had agreed with Tooth & Nail CEO Brandon Ebel to return and record a second album for the label.

On February 8, 2012, the band announced on their Facebook page that they were finished with initial recording and would be releasing the album soon. On March 12, Capital Lights announced that the name of the album was officially going to be Rhythm N’ Moves.

On May 17, the band announced the album artwork for the release was official, as well as highlighted the first early review of the album from Indie Vision Music a few days later. On June 7, though the album was originally supposed to be released on July 19, the release date was changed to two days earlier for July 17.

On July 5, lead singer Bryson Phillps posted an official blog updating and recapping everyone on an overview of Capital Lights' origins, as well as their recent journey to the new release.

On June 29, Rhythm N’ Moves was officially released for pre-order on Tooth & Nail's official site. This was followed on July 3 with a pre-order option added on iTunes as well. Rhythm N’ Moves was debuted on July 17, 2015, as scheduled.

When addressing the slight change in genre for the record, lead singer Bryson Phillips stated: "We're still power pop, but there’s less power and more pop on this project... There's not as much rock this round as the first album and it's more laid back, but we've also expanded with more styles. We're still the same band, but we put the focus on melodies without trying to be overly technical." He went on to further say: "There’s much more to this album than strictly rock, and in the case of ‘Say Hey!’ there's even a hip-hop feel...We just decided ‘why not?’ and went all out. Some songs have sampled drums and a few songs hardly have any guitars at all. We didn't try to limit ourselves by trying to reach a specific audience, but branch out to those that might not have listened to us before."

== Critical reception ==
Professional ratings
Review scores
Source	Rating
Cross Rhythms	6/10 squares
Jesus Freak Hideout	2.5/5 stars
Indie Vision Music	4/5 stars
Louder Than the Music	3/5 stars
New Release Tuesday	3/5 stars

The release received positive to average praise from most professional music sites and reviews.

JJ Francesco of New Release Tuesday positively praised the album and stated: "Both lyrically and musically, the album seems to be very consistent. It’s cheesy, it’s syrupy, it’s cliché (but yet still fresh), it’s poppy beyond all reason, it’s nearly impossible to get out of your head, and I dare you not to dance along to the band’s ridiculously catchy sound. Essentially, it’s Capital Lights!" Jono Davies of Louder Than Music went on to say that the "opening title track 'Rhythm 'N' Moves' is pop rock at its very best. With a beating bass that leads nicely into a sort of catchy pop chorus of 'I got the rhythms, she's got the moves'...Obviously the lyrics are more pop than congregational worship, but the band's latest offering is more a view of their every day lives and what the world has thrown at them...Tracks like "Coldfront Heatstroke" and "Honey Don't Jump" aren't too shabby at all. Capital Lights do what they do and they do it very well." Wayne Myatt of Jesus Freak Hideout further commented: I think Capital Lights wanted to do a little bit of experimenting, as well as have some fun on this release, and their fans will find something they enjoy on this record, while the new sound could generate new fans." Finally, Cimarron Hatch of Indie Vision Music came out and applauded the album saying: "Capital Lights is an amazing band—we all know that. But this album shows that they have an unbelievable amount of talent to be able to come back from their hiatus and make such great music. They've included all the elements that fans know and love them for, but have also branched out to experiment and try new things...Even if you've never been a fan of Capital Lights before, I highly recommend checking out this album."

On the other hand, Timothy Estabrooks of Jesus Freak Hideout plainly said: "It's hard to fight expectations, and high expectations were exactly what Capital Lights faced in their return. They seem to have made a conscious decision to change their style in an attempt to pursue popular success, even going so far as to openly state that they were seeking to write radio hits. While their sincerity is admirable, none of the changes implemented have been for the better. In the end, Rhythm 'N' Moves is much less than it could have and should have been, and may go down as one of the bigger disappointments of the year."

The band responded positively to the overall low-key nature of the release and its more average reception when lead singer Bryson Phillips stated: "There actually wasn't much to it on our end. We no longer tour because we are all focused on our own careers or school. The day it released was pretty much a normal day for us other than the fact that we were all excited that the album is finally in stores! I have done a few interviews here and there and that's about the extent of it. We consider it a success!"

== Singles ==
On June 11, 2012, Capital Lights released the first single off the record "Coldfront Heatstroke." On July 18, the second single "Caroline" was released. The third single and title track of the release, "Rhythms 'N" Moves" was released on June 27. Finally, on July 9, the fourth and final single "Gotta Have Love" was released, featuring Jason Dunn (former lead singer of Hawk Nelson). All four singles were given official lyric video releases on YouTube chronologically following each of their announcements.

== Track listing ==
All tracks are written by Bryson Phillips.

No.	Title	Length
1.	"Rhythm 'N' Moves"	3:46
2.	"Let Your Hair Down"	4:23
3.	"Caroline"	3:25
4.	"Coldfront Heatstroke"	3:27
5.	"Newport Party" (featuring Bayn)	4:04
6.	"Honey Don't Jump"	4:24
7.	"Say Hey!"	3:02
8.	"Don't Drop Dead Juliet"	3:48
9.	"Hey Little One"	5:11
10.	"Save the Last Dance"	3:42
11.	"Gotta Have Love" (featuring Jason Dunn)	3:24
Total length:		42:36

== Personnel ==
Per liner notes Capital Lights

- Bryson Phillips – lead vocals
- Brett Admire – guitar
- Jonathan Williams – guitar
- Jon Odle – bass
- Michael Phillips – drums

Additional musicians and production

- Bayn (Trystan Edgar) – additional vocals on track 5
- Jason Dunn (formerly of Hawk Nelson) – additional vocals on track 11
- Daniel Barger – whistling on track 8
- Ryan Allen – piano on track 9
- Brandon Ebel – executive producer
- Nathan Griffis – engineer
- Derek Taylor – mixing
- Troy Glessner – mastering
- Adam Skatula – A&R
- Ryan Clark – art direction/design

== Chart performance ==
Chart (2012)	Peak position
Billboard Heatseekers Albums	20
Billboard Christian Albums	30

== Notes ==
- In the lyrics to the song "Let Your Hair Down" there is a wordplay shoutout to the band Run Kid Run.
- The song "Newport Party" refers to the city of Newport, California.
- In his appearance on the bridge of "Newport Party", the rapper Bayn pays reference to the band's previous album This is an Outrage!, as well as the group's song "Mile Away".
- "Don't Drop Dead Juliet" metaphorically refers to the Juliet of William Shakespeare's Romeo and Juliet.
- Aaron Sprinkle, producer on the band's previous release This Is an Outrage!, was planned to help produce the album early on in its creation. However, the album was ultimately self-produced by the band themselves because time and travel commitments were not possible for any of the members' schedules in order to go to the Tooth & Nail studio in Nashville, Tennessee.
- The album was composed, produced, and recorded largely in lead singer Bryson Phillips' house, as well as the local Broadway Baptist Church.
