= Dave Tweedie =

American musician ( (born 1968)

David Russell Tweedie (born November 27, 1968, in Richmond, California) is an American composer, multi-instrumentalist and record producer. Tweedie’s compositions have appeared on Fox’s So You Think You Can Dance, The Bernie Mac Show, and others.

== Early life ==
Tweedie's father was born in Belfast, Northern Ireland, and grew up in Glasgow, Scotland before moving to Richmond in 1960. His mother is from Richmond, California. He has one older sister. Living in the small, working-middle class town of Crockett, California, Tweedie grew up with Billie Joe Armstrong and Mike Dirnt of the rock band Green Day, as well as Scott Holderby of pioneering heavy funk metal band Mordred. His first instrument was trumpet, which he played first chair in the school band, and it took his teacher a few years to realize he was learning the music by ear rather than reading it. This teacher noted Tweedie's aptitude and demonstrated interest in music, and made the band room available to him when he was otherwise being sent to the library for an inability to sit still. At age ten Tweedie began playing drums, picking up guitar and keys as a teenager.

Tweedie served as Drum Captain for two years at Pinole Valley High School, and received a second-hand drum kit from a high school music teacher; he still plays the kick drum from this sparkly blue 1960s Ludwig kit. By the time he graduated he was playing in bands around the Bay Area. He cut his first record in 1989 at The Record Plant in Sausalito, California, drumming for Chris Loiter and the Hangouts.

== Professional development ==
In 1994, Tweedie heard Joel Smith (bass and drums, Edwin Hawkins) play drums at the Kazake Lounge in the Fillmore District of San Francisco, and approached him after the gig, offering to do anything in exchange for his tutelage. For the next two years, Tweedie ferried Smith to jazz, pop and gospel gigs all over the Bay Area, serving as his roadie, absorbing everything he could. He walked away from the experience with more than music theory, but a spiritual and metaphysical commitment to time as informed by Joel Smith. To this day, Tweedie is known for his distinctive and committed drumming style.

Tweedie's first forays into recording were as a teenager, on a borrowed Tascam four-track. He recorded his own and his friends' music, and received a positive response. When his band had the opportunity to record with Jim Gaines (Stevie Ray Vaughan, Huey Lewis and the News, Journey), Tweedie noted the vast contributions Gaines made with a few simple comments. This informed his ambition to produce records, to "make things sound how I heard in my head".

Tweedie says: "I was at every single mixing session I was ever involved with, just to be there, to learn." Opportunities followed, and friends Desmond Shea and Scott Stoltier offered the use of their studio, Division Hi-Fi, for Dave to produce his first full-length record for The Stolen Bibles. Another friend, Mike Busbee, became Eric Valentine's first engineer, and shared information that led to Tweedie buying his initial gear and setting up his own recording studio.

== Musical career ==
As an in-demand drummer, Tweedie became a fixture of the San Francisco music scene, playing with the likes of Angelo Moore and Norwood Fisher of Fishbone, David Immerglück of Counting Crows, Karl Perazzo of Santana, Les Claypool of Primus, Eric Martin of Mr. Big, Michael Manring and Alex Skolnick.

In 1997, Tweedie, alongside Stephen Bradley (vocals), joined The Good Life, a band that would open for Smash Mouth in Conocti, CA and No Doubt at The Ventura Theater in 1999. When The Good Life disbanded later that year, Tweedie and Bradley continued to write songs together, pursuing a partnership that has given rise to hundreds of songs and dozens of television placements.

In 2002 Tweedie and Bradley formed Chocolate O’Brian Productions, producing records for local bands such as BLVD and tracks for international artists such as Boolfight. Their achievements include remixes for Flipsyde's "Someday" (2004) and No Doubt’s “It’s My Life” (2004). Their production reel, 2004’s eponymous Chocolate O’Brian, is available on iTunes and has been featured on various network television programs. They also performed as a live band. Dave Tweedie produced Motive for Movement, the sophomore effort from Hellcat band Static Thought.

== Music for film and television ==
Since the mid-1990s, Tweedie's songwriting and multi-instrumental proficiency have been in demand: he has been called on to write fresh music for TV shows. As drummer and co-founder of the BAMMIE-Award winning group, Los Angelitos, he wrote queues for CBS show Nash Bridges. Solo, he wrote a new score for Roger Corman's Velocity, a re-edited version of The Wild Ride, starring Jack Nicholson, with new footage.

In 2006 a request came from music supervisors in Hollywood to write some music for The Bernie Mac Show, which led to work on MTV's short-lived Celebrity Rap Superstar, and finally to writing original music for Fox’s So You Think You Can Dance, where he has found professional success, as well as a dedicated fan base in the show's many online forums.

== Current projects ==
Tweedie currently writes with two projects: Jet Stream, with Stephen Bradley and Bijou Choder, a pop / dance / rap group that has found commercial success in DirecTV ads, and various TV placements such as MTV’s Paris Hilton’s New BFF. He also works with Oakland-based singer/songwriter Oona Garthwaite in their soul-rock/pop band OONA, producing, co-writing, and music directing, and playing drums live. OONA was named one of MTV2’s Bay Area Breakout Bands in August, 2009.
