= This Is an Outrage! =

Studio album by Capital Lights
- Released: July 8, 2008
- Recorded: Seattle, Washington
- Genres: Christian rock, power pop, pop-punk
- Length: 45:05
- Label: Tooth & Nail
- Producer: Aaron Sprinkle

Capital Lights chronology
The Revival of the Fittest EP (2007)	This Is an Outrage! (2008)	Rhythm 'N' Moves (2012)

Alternative cover
- Japan edition album cover

This Is an Outrage! is the debut studio album by the American Christian pop rock band Capital Lights, with their previous EP being released under the name Aftereight. It was released on July 8, 2008 under Tooth & Nail Records.

== Critical reception ==
Professional ratings
Review scores
Source	Rating
AbsolutePunk	7.1/10 stars
AllMusic	(Positive)
CCM Magazine	2.5/5 stars
Cross Rhythms	6/10 stars
Crosswalk.com	(Positive)
Indie Vision Music	8.5/10 stars
Jesus Freak Hideout	4.5/5 stars
New Release Tuesday	4/5 stars

The album garnered mostly very positive reviews from most professional music sites and reviews.

Lindsay Wiseman of Jesus Freak Hideout positively said: "Overall, it is an extremely powerful debut and is consistently fun, energetic, and extremely pleasing to the ears. Capital Lights has made a name for themselves with This Is an Outrage!, no doubt." Nathan of New Release Tuesday went on to say: "Ever wonder what Anberlin might sound if they were punk rock? Well wonder no more because now we have a close example. The debut album for the band Capital Lights is here, and it’s an outstanding blend of Relient K, and Anberlin, with some bits that sound like Eleventyseven and Run Kid Run. The result is one of the best punk/power pop/rock, with a hint of emo rock, albums in a while." Griffin Klemick plainly said in closing, "The end of the story: In July 2008 this CD unseated Alkaline Trio’s Agony & Irony, the latest effort by my favorite band, in my CD player. This Is an Outrage! did not leave it for more than five weeks."

On the other hand, Matthew Tsani of AbsolutePunk did frankly state, "In the end, the main letdown of the album is the fact that this band had an ample amount of potential to write songs that could very well make them the next decent pop-punk hit, but instead are writing songs that prompt people to categorize them as merely “generic.” Whether this is because of the influence of the label or not is not really that big of a deal. What is important, however, is that Capital Lights swim themselves out of this monotonous sea of electro-pop before they make another album. In the meantime, fans will still have fun with This Is an Outrage!" Matt Conner of CCM Magazine negatively said: "Unfortunately, the bottom line is set low as many other bands simply do it better. If Tooth & Nail sticks with them, maturity is certainly a possibility as seen with other bands (i.e. Relient K). But for now, Capital Lights fails to make its mark."

== Singles ==
On May 6, 2008, the first single "Outrage" off the album was released. It was later placed on the X 2009 Christian rock hits compilation album, as well as the 2011 compilation album Time Will Pass You By.

"Out of Control" peaked at #1 on the R&R Christian Rock charts in 2008.

"Outrage", "Out of Control", and "Return" all peaked within the top 5 of the ChristianRock.Net radio charts.

Besides these, the song "Worth as Much as a Counterfeit Dollar" was also a single from the release.

== Track listing ==
All tracks are written by Capital Lights, except track 6 by Capital Lights and Aaron Sprinkle.

No.	Title	Length
1.	"Outrage"	3:49
2.	"Worth as Much as a Counterfeit Dollar"	3:05
3.	"Out of Control"	3:37
4.	"Remember the Day"	3:30
5.	"Miracle Man"	3:37
6.	"Mile Away"	3:43
7.	"Work It Out"	3:25
8.	"Let the Little Lady Talk"	4:09
9.	"Return"	4:24
10.	"Kick It Off"	3:21
11.	"The Night of Your Life Is When You'll Die"	3:11
12.	"Frank Morris"	5:14
Total length:		45:05

Japanese edition bonus track
No.	Title	Length
13.	"Can I Get an Amen!"	3:53

- Track 2, 11 & 13 originally on The Revival of the Fittest EP.

== Personnel ==
Per liner notes

Capital Lights

- Bryson Phillips - lead vocals, bass
- Brett Admire - guitar
- Jonathan Williams - guitar
- Michael Phillips - drums

Additional musicians and production

- Aaron Sprinkle - producer, engineering, keys
- Chris Carmichael - strings
- Randy Torres - engineering
- David Bendeth - mixing on track 1, 2, 4 & 7
- JR McNeely - mixing on track 3, 5, 6, 8, 9, 10, 11 & 12
- Troy Glessner - mastering
- Aaron Mlasko - drum tech.

== Chart performance ==
Chart (2008)	Peak position
US Billboard Heatseekers Albums	51
US Billboard Christian Albums	34
US Billboard Christian Rock Albums	12

== Music videos ==
- Outrage on YouTube

== Notes ==
- The tracks "Worth as Much as a Counterfeit Dollar", "The Night of Your Life is When You Die", and "Can I Get an Amen!" are all re-recorded tracks from the band's former incarnation of Aftereight.
- The phrase "Here's looking at you, kid" from the opening track "Outrage" is a reference to the famous line from the film Casablanca.
- The song "Frank Morris" is named after the Alcatraz prisoner of the same name, famous for the June 1962 Alcatraz escape.
- The same year of the release, the band also debuted their first Christmas single "His Favorite Christmas Story". The song was included on the Tooth & Nail Christmas compilation album X Christmas. The song was later re-released on the 2011 Christmas compilation album Rockin' Around the Christmas Tree.
