= Less Love =

American rock band

- Origin: Oklahoma City, Oklahoma
- Genres: Southern rock, Hard rock
- Years active: 2006–present
- Labels: Quickstar Records, Lackpro Records
- Members: Sky McCullogh (aka Sky Mac); Billy Gro
- Past members: Rebecca Hawk; Brooke Reynolds; Trevor Lindley; Sarah Wilmoth; Chris Snyder; Bria Nicole
- Website: lesslove.lackpro.com

Less Love is an American rock band formed in 2006, in Oklahoma City, by Sky McCullough and Billy Gro. The band released their debut single in 2008 which was titled Magical Purple Hair. Their single Horse Race was released in 2016 and was nominated at The Independent Music Awards in the category of Best Rock/Hard Rock song. The video for Horse Race won a Global Music Award for Best Music Video of 2016.

== History ==
In 2006, Billy Gro's band Wondernaut was about to release their first CD on American Laundromat Records. At the time Sky's brother Paul Baustert played bass for Wondernaut. Realizing they had similar taste in music Billy and Sky initially began recording music to be uploaded to Myspace. They didn't give the project the name Less Love until two years later when they released their first single. The band has released two LPs and multiple singles on indie labels Lackpro Records and Quickstar Records. In 2008, the band was signed with Quickstar Records and released their first single, Magical Purple Hair. The song charted on the College Music Journal Top 200. Their second single, Lovelock was released in 2010.

The band released their first album in 2011. It was a multi-genre collection of original songs including upbeat noise rock, eerie ballads and a traditional country song called Thank You Lord For Willie Nelson. The latter included a pedal steel guitar solo played by Sub Pop Recording artist Bruce Tull of the Scud Mountain Boys. The album was titled Go Fuck Yourself.

Less Love collaborated with the band Wondernaut in 2013 to release their second album Paradigms in the Design. The album received positive reviews including being voted as Album of the year by Rust Magazine.

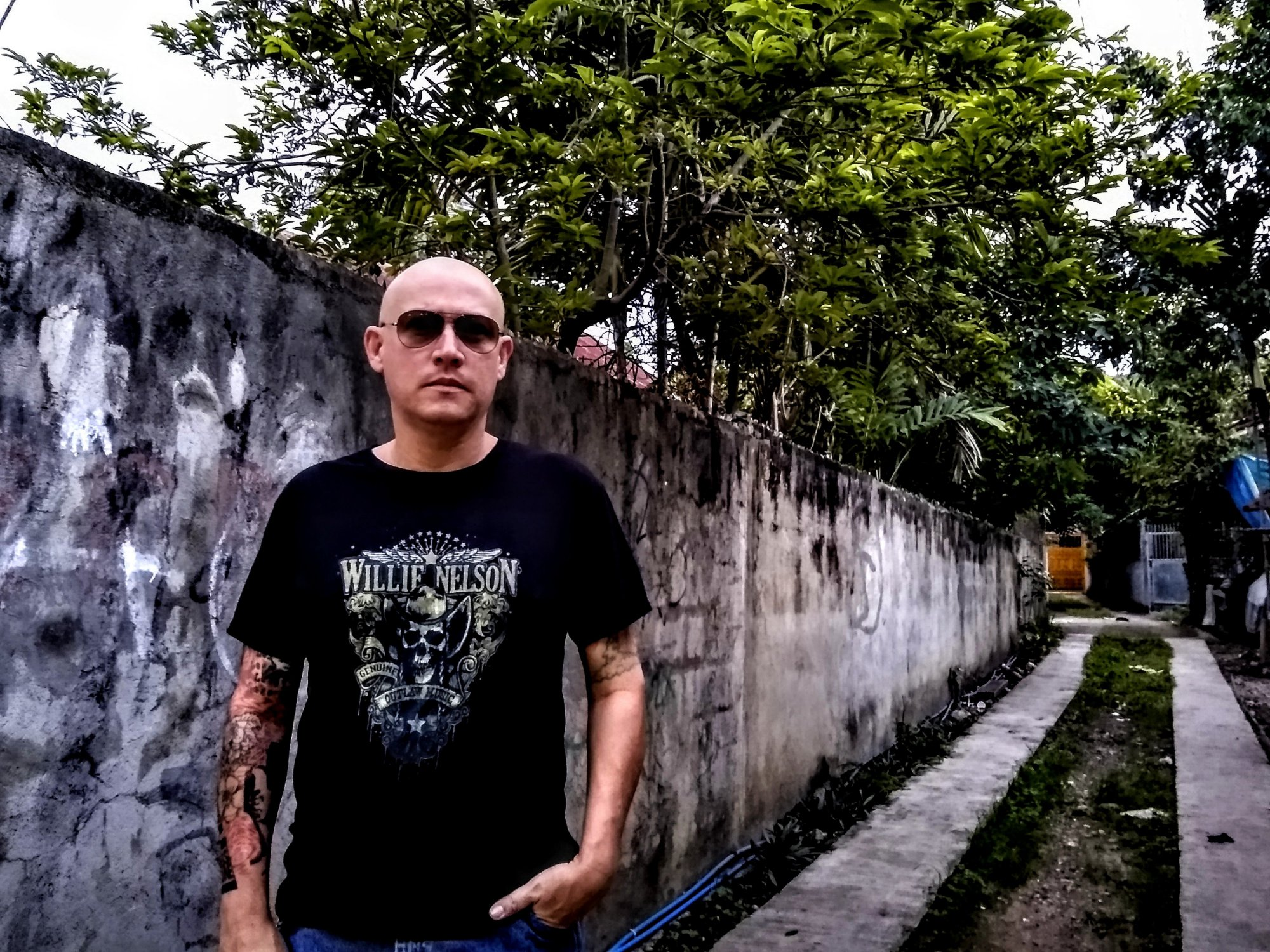

In 2016, Less Love recorded the single Horse Race with Grammy Award winning music producer Michael Trepagnier (Coldplay) and engineer Kevin Lively (Rage Against the Machine). The single won a Global Music Awards and was nominated at Independent Music Awards. The music video was also voted Best Music Video by The Hollywood International Moving Picture Film Festival and won two awards at the KSCR Music Video Awards. Horse Race was originally written and recorded by the band Colourmusic. It was recorded after Sky McCullough and Colourmusic band member Nicholas Ley had a friendly disagreement. Nicholas said, nobody would ever cover Colourmusic, so Less Love did.

The success of “Horse Race” garnered the band invitations to play music festivals and attend awards shows all around the globe. Regrettably in a world where nobody buys music the cost of fame was too high for the members of Less Love. When being confronted with no “payday” and an expensive cost to travel the band members decided the struggle was too much. Less Love called it quits. Sky McCullough remains the only touring original member of the band. He stated, “Billy Gro remains a member of the band but only in a studio role. Less Love is now mostly made up of hired guns. It greatly improves the workflow.”

In 2020, Less Love began promoting their anti-racism single “Snow White Trash" (Trump's Americans). The subsequent music video for the song has been nominated by the Los Angeles Music Video Awards in the category Best Rock Video of 2020.

In addition to performing with Less Love McCullough is also an actor. He has worked in William H. Macy directorial debut Rudderless and in Dinesh D'Souza's America: Imagine the World Without Her. He has also worked in Kings of Leon's music video Beautiful War.

== Discography ==
Title	Album/Single	Year	Label
Magical Purple Hair	Single	2008	Quickstar Records
Lovelock	Single	2010	Quickstar Records
Go Fuck Yourself	Album	2011	Lackpro Records
If You	Single	2012	Lackpro Records
Second Hand Coat	Single	2012	Lackpro Records
Paradigm in the Design	Album	2013	Lackpro Records
Lollygagging	Single	2014	Lackpro Records
Horse Race	Single	2016	Lackpro Records
Snow White Trash (Trump's Americans)	Single	2019	Lackpro Records
