= Tamer Animals =

Studio album by Other Lives
- Released: May 10, 2011
- Genre: Folk, indie rock
- Length: 38:16
- Label: TBD Records, PIAS Recordings

Other Lives chronology
Other Lives (2009)	Tamer Animals (2011)	Mind the Gap EP (2012)

Professional ratings
Review scores
Source	Rating
Pitchfork	7.4/10
The Guardian	4/5 stars

Tamer Animals is the second album by the American indie rock band Other Lives. "For 12," the album's first single, was picked by Thom Yorke for a playlist on Radiohead.com.
