= Boolfight =

- Origin: France
- Genre: Dream Pop Electronic Indie Rock
- Years active: 2005-Present
- Label: Montmorency Records
- Website: www.boolfight.com

Boolfight is an indie electro-pop band from Paris, France, best known for their album Feral released in 2012 on Montmorency Records, and their Multiple Devils EP released in 2010 on the same label.

Boolfight supported the vinyl release of the Multiple Devils EP with a string of shows in Europe in 2010.

Before 2010, Boolfight had released an album in 2008, From Zero To One, and a self-titled EP, produced in 2005 by Dave Tweedie and Stephen Bradley (No Doubt).

In 2011, Boolfight released Loose Cannons & B-Sides, a collection of b-sides.

In 2012, Boolfight released Deluxe, the first single of their second album, Feral, released in November 2012 on Montmorency Records, a collaboration with Nicolas Fromageau (M83, Team Ghost).

In 2013, the band had two releases: the All In EP, and an expanded edition of their album Feral, featuring yet unreleased tracks.

In 2017, frontman Kelvin Manu released under the name Fantasque a single named Driven and an album entitled Life Beyond Logic .

== Discography ==
=== Albums ===
- 2013: Feral (Expanded Edition)
- 2012: Feral
- 2008: From Zero to One

=== EP ===
- 2013: All In
- 2011: Loose Cannons & B-Sides
- 2010: Multiple Devils
- 2005: Boolfight
