= Flight of the Flynns =

Studio album by Kunek
- Released: September 12, 2006
- Genre: Folk, indie rock, post rock
- Length: 49:15
- Label: Play Tyme Entertainment
- Producer: Eric Kiner

Flight of the Flynns is the debut album of American indie rock band Kunek, now known as Other Lives. The album was released physically on September 12, 2006, on the label Play Tyme Entertainment. With influences from European folk music, Post-Rock and Classical, the project initially began as an instrumental concept album, before songs were shortened and lyrics were added a year prior to release.

== Critical reception ==
Professional ratings
Review scores
Source	Rating
Glide Magazine	(5/11)

Flight of the Flynns received mixed reviews upon initial release. Glide Magazine gave the album 5/11 stars, stating "Kunek doesn't belong in the ambient bin, as it's a bit more Badly Drawn Boy with a couple of Beatles moments thrown in, but most fans of the genre would appreciate the album.". Independent artist review site DOA called the vocals "a little Radioheaded", but stated that "In the spirit of the concept album, Kunek arrange choice tracks that bleed into one another nicely"

== Track listing ==
No.	Title	Length
1.	"We Have Become"	4:30
2.	"A Sign of Life"	4:17
3.	"Bright Eyes"	2:36
4.	"The Swell"	4:11
5.	"As You Were"	1:12
6.	"All Together"	4:16
7.	"Oh Noble Eric"	3:31
8.	"Section 2"	6:18
9.	"Fast Asleep"	4:38
10.	"Coma"	3:08
11.	"Das Ollec"	6:43
12.	"Good Day"	3:55
