= The Revival of the Fittest EP =

EP by Aftereight
- Released: September 18, 2007
- Genre: Christian rock
- Length: 20:36
- Label: Independent
- Producer: Aftereight

Aftereight chronology
Better Late Than Never (2006)	The Revival of the Fittest EP (2007)	This Is an Outrage! (2008)

Professional ratings
Review scores
Source	Rating
Jesus Freak Hideout	4.5/5 stars
New Release Tuesday	5/5 stars

The Revival of the Fittest EP is the second and final extended play by the American Christian hard rock band Aftereight. It was independently released on September 18, 2007. The EP is no longer available digitally, and is also out of print.

The EP served as a bridging release of the band's genre transition from hard rock to their newly found pop rock sound. Ultimately, this would lead the band to change their name to Capital Lights the next year, as a sign of their new direction.

It is also the release to spark the attention of Tooth & Nail Records, and what eventually led to the band signing with the label.

== Background ==
Bryson Phillips later told Tulsa World, after the release, that he considered this the band's first professional release, stating that they previously "just burned discs to give away and sell at shows. There was nothing professional about it whatsoever."

== Critical reception ==
Though reception was small, the release garnered high praise from the few music sites that did review it.

JJ Francesco of New Release Tuesday praised the EP immensely saying: "This album is a nice treat if you can somehow find it. The rock is good and it's interesting to hear what the poppy rock Capital Lights sounds up with the energy amped up a bit." Preston Tucker of Jesus Freak Hideout plainly stated: "Overall, this album is very solid. In fact, it would be a grave mistake for any power pop / rock fan to turn this one down."

== Track listing ==
All tracks are written by Aftereight.

No.	Title	Length
1.	"Now You Can Show...So Show Up"	3:03
2.	"Lover of the Worlds War"	3:59
3.	"Worth as Much as a Counterfeit Dollar"	3:03
4.	"Spreading Rumors in the South (Homie Don't Play That)"	3:26
5.	"The Night of Your Life is When You Die"	3:12
6.	"Can I Get an Amen!"	3:53
Total length:		20:36

== Personnel ==
Aftereight

- Bryson Phillips - lead vocals, bass
- Brett Admire - guitar
- Jonathan Williams - guitar
- Michael Phillips - drums

== Notes ==
- The tracks "Worth as Much as a Counterfeit Dollar", "The Night of Your Life is When You Die", and "Can I Get an Amen!" are all re-recorded for the band's next album This Is an Outrage!.
