= Capital Lights =

American Christian pop rock band

- Origin: Tulsa, Oklahoma, U.S.
- Genres: Pop rock; power pop; pop punk; Christian rock
- Years active: 2002–2009, 2010–2012
- Labels: Tooth & Nail
- Members: Bryson Phillips; Brett Admire; Nathan Nelson; Jon Odle; Michael Phillips
- Website: Capital Lights on Facebook

Capital Lights was an American Christian pop rock band from Tulsa, Oklahoma. Formed in 2002 as Aftereight (stylized afterEIGHT), the band changed its name after signing to Tooth & Nail Records in 2008. The group initially disbanded in 2009, but reunited in late 2010 until 2012.

The band has produced three full-length studio albums, two EPs, and multiple singles. Their two latest albums have charted on Billboard in multiple categories.

== Biography ==
Origins as Aftereight (2002-2007)

Capital Lights was formed in Tulsa, Oklahoma in 2002 as a Christian screamo band called Aftereight. The group consisted of lead vocalist Jacob Dement, guitarist Brett Admire, bassist Bryson Phillips, and drummer Jay Caudle. The band chose their name due to the fact their band was only able to practice after 8:00 at night, when part of the band's shift at a local diner was over. Under this name, the band released a self-titled EP in 2003.

In 2005, drummer Jay Caudle left the group and was replaced by Phillips' brother Michael on drums.

On August 13, 2006, Aftereight released their first studio album Better Late Than Never under the independent label, Yeah Siam Records. Later in December, the group went on to play at Diversafest 2006.

In late 2006, following the release of the album, vocalist Jacob Dement and guitarist Justin Lamproe both left the band, resulting in bassist Bryson Phillips taking Dement's place on vocals. Shortly after, guitarist Nathan Nelson joined the group.

On September 20, 2007, the band, as their new line-up, debuted their second EP entitled The Revival of the Fittest. The release showcased a directional bridging and genre change from screamo to pop rock. This eventually led to the noticing of Tooth & Nail Records and shortly signing with the label.

Name change and This Is an Outrage! (2008)

In 2008, while recording their debut studio album for Tooth & Nail, Aftereight officially changed its name to Capital Lights as a way of signifying their new musical direction. According to lead singer Bryson Phillips: "With afterEIGHT, we screamed a whole lot. It was a completely different style. It was a lot harder music with the screaming, but we changed to this band. We still kept the name afterEIGHT for a while, and so we sold our new EP as that band. We had a lot of member changes, and I moved to vocals. We got a new guitar and bass player. Now we're more poppy. It was a huge change. When we did change to Capital Lights, it was just a name change because we had already changed our sound...We didn't like the name, and we were ready to change it. We kept it to keep some fans in our hometown of Tulsa, but they didn't like the name either. So we just decided while we were in Seattle to change it."

After finishing production on the new album, the band then toured in the months following as the opening act to the Green T Tour, headlined by fellow Tooth and Nail act Hawk Nelson and second act Run Kid Run.

On July 8, 2008, Capital Lights debuted their first album This Is an Outrage! with Tooth & Nail. The album received all-around high praise and reception from music sites and reviews.

The band went on to perform at Creationfest 2008. Later in September, Jon Odle joined the group as the band's new bassist, relieving Bryson Phillips to focus solely on lead vocals.

The same year, the band released their first Christmas single "His Favorite Christmas Story". The song was included on the Tooth & Nail Christmas compilation album X Christmas. The song was later re-released on the 2011 Christmas compilation album Rockin' Around the Christmas Tree.

Breakup (2009)

On the August 19, 2009 Capital Lights announced on their MySpace page that they had broken up stating that "We all felt God had different plans for our lives, and it would have been impossible to pursue those plans while continuing with the band."

Reunion and Rhythm 'N' Moves (2010-2012)

On Christmas Eve of 2010, lead singer Bryson Phillips appeared on RadioU's morning show The R!OT for an interview during their Christmas Eve show. He announced on the behalf of the band that they had agreed with Tooth & Nail CEO Brandon Ebel to record a second album for the label.

On February 8, 2012, the band announced on their Facebook page that they were finished with initial recording and would be releasing the album soon. The album, Rhythm 'N' Moves, was released July 17, 2012 on Tooth & Nail.

Present

The band has not been active since 2012, and when he was asked if he thought Capital Lights would produce anymore albums, lead singer Bryson Phillips stated: "At this time we have no plans of doing another album. Of course you never know what God has planned for the future, but I believe that chapter in our life is over. We were blessed to experience it!"

== Musical style and influence ==
The band identifies themselves as a Christian band. When asked to identify the content of the band's music, guitarist Nathan Nelson responded, "Mostly life situations. We're a Christian band[,] meaning all of the members are Christians and we live according to that[,] but we don't try and force it on anyone. Most of our songs are just about everyday situations and everyday life dealing with relationships and people." Furthermore, when asked if his faith influenced his songwriting, lead singer Bryson Phillips stated: "I'd say yes, sometimes our faith will influence the way we write. Some examples are 'Gotta Have Love' and 'Honey Don't Jump' but for the most part life experiences influence the songs. All of us in the band are Christians and live by faith. But most of our songs are simply just songs. . . nothing bad but nothing spiritual. Just songs."

The band brings a mixture of power pop and Christian rock, with an occasional pop punk flare. After migrating from the genre of Christian screamo under their former incarnation of Aftereight, Capital Lights developed their current style of power pop for multiple reasons. According to lead singer Bryson Phillips, the change was due to the fact he couldn't sing the band's original genre when he took up the mantle as lead vocalist, and that Tooth & Nail had not been interested in their original style to begin with when looking to sign the group to their label.

The band's current sound has been compared to the likes of fellow Christian rock artists such as Relient K, Hawk Nelson, Run Kid Run, Stellar Kart, Eleventyseven and Philmont.

== Band members ==
Final lineup

- Bryson Phillips – bass guitar (2002–2008), lead vocals (2007–2012)
- Brett Admire – guitar (2002–2012)
- Nathan Nelson – guitar (2007–2012)
- Jon Odle – bass guitar (2008–2012)
- Michael Phillips – drums (2005–2012)

Former

- Jacob Dement – lead vocals (2002–2006)
- Justin Lamproe – guitar (2002–2006)
- Jay Caudle – drums (2002–2005)
- Nic Givons - guitar (2006)

Touring

- Justin Rutherford – fill-in bass guitar (2008–2009)

== Discography ==
=== Albums/EPs ===
Date of release	Title	Label	Top Christian Albums
2003	Aftereight EP	independent	—
August 13, 2006	Better Late Than Never	Yeah Siam Records	—
September 20, 2007	The Revival of the Fittest EP	independent	—
July 8, 2008	This Is an Outrage!	Tooth & Nail Records	34
July 17, 2012	Rhythm 'N' Moves	Tooth & Nail Records	30

=== Singles ===
As Aftereight

- "The Only Way to Kill a Ghost"

As Capital Lights

- "Outrage"
- "Out of Control"
- "Return"
- "Worth as Much as a Counterfeit Dollar"
- "Coldfront Heatstroke"
- "Caroline"
- "Rhythm 'N' Moves"
- "Gotta Have Love"
