= Time Is Fiction =

Studio album by Edison Glass
- Released: February 5, 2008
- Genre: Indie rock
- Length: 43:50
- Label: Credential Recordings
- Producer: Nathan Dantzler, Edison Glass

Edison Glass chronology
A Burn or a Shiver (2006)	Time Is Fiction (2008)

Professional ratings
Review scores
Source	Rating
Allmusic	4/5 stars
Patrol Magazine	(7.0/10)

Time Is Fiction is the second studio album by American indie rock band Edison Glass. The album was released by Credential Recordings on February 5, 2008 (after being pushed back from a scheduled November 20, 2007 release date), and was produced by Nathan Dantzler and Edison Glass. The CD release show was held at Looney Tunes CD Store in West Babylon, New York, the same location where the band held the CD release show for their debut album, A Burn or a Shiver.

The phrase "Time is Fiction" appeared earlier in the lyrics of Chemlab's song "Pink," released 1996.

== Track listing ==
No.	Title	Length
1.	"Let Go"	2:21
2.	"Cold Condition"	3:37
3.	"Without a Sound"	4:01
4.	"End of You"	3:11
5.	"All Our Memories"	4:14
6.	"Chances"	3:33
7.	"See Me Through"	3:47
8.	"The Jig is Up"	2:37
9.	"Our Bodies Sing"	3:26
10.	"Children in the Street"	3:43
11.	"Jean Val Jean"	4:16
12.	"Time Is Fiction"	4:22
