= Robotique Majestique =

Studio album by Ghostland Observatory
- Released: 2008
- Genre: Electronic
- Label: Trashy Moped Recordings
- Producer: Thomas Ross Turner

Ghostland Observatory chronology
Paparazzi Lightning (2007)	Robotique Majestique (2008)	Codename: Rondo (2010)

Professional ratings
Aggregate scores
Source	Rating
Metacritic	61/100
Review scores
Source	Rating
Pitchfork Media	1.5/10 link
Popmatters	link
Rolling Stone	link
The Stranger	link

Robotique Majestique is the third studio album by Ghostland Observatory. It was released on February 29, 2008, by Trashy Moped Recordings.

== Track listing ==
1. "Opening Credits"
2. "Heavy Heart"
3. "No Place for Me"
4. "Freeheart Lover"
5. "Dancing on my Grave"
6. "Robotique Majestique"
7. "The Band Marches On"
8. "Holy Ghost White Noise"
9. "HFM"
10. "Club Soda"
