= A Burn or a Shiver =

Studio album by Edison Glass
- Released: April 4, 2006
- Recorded: Valley Village, California
- Genre: Indie rock
- Length: 54:00
- Label: Credential Recordings
- Producer: Brad Wood

Edison Glass chronology
A Burn or a Shiver (2006)	Time Is Fiction (2008)

Professional ratings
Review scores
Source	Rating
Allmusic	link
Christian Music Today	4.5/5 stars

A Burn or a Shiver is the debut studio album by American indie rock band Edison Glass, released on April 4, 2006, by Credential Recordings. It was produced by Brad Wood. The CD release show was held at a music store on Long Island, New York, the band's hometown.

== Track listing ==
No.	Title	Length
1.	"My Fair One"	3:39
2.	"Forever"	3:25
3.	"Starlight"	3:57
4.	"This House"	4:13
5.	"Today Has Wings"	4:27
6.	"Dear Honesty"	3:00
7.	"In Such a State"	3:22
8.	"Angelic in Heart"	3:23
9.	"Minutes for Memories"	3:26
10.	"The River"	3:26
11.	"You Mean the World to Me"	4:32
12.	"A Burn or a Shiver"	5:17
13.	"When All We Have is Taken/Comfort"	7:10
