= This Is Who We Are (Run Kid Run album) =

Studio album by Run Kid Run
- Released: May 18, 2006
- Genre: Pop punk, Christian punk
- Length: 35:51
- Label: Tooth & Nail
- Producer: James Paul Wisner

Run Kid Run chronology
| This Is Who We Are (2006) | Love at the Core (2008) |

This Is Who We Are is the debut album from Christian pop punk band Run Kid Run. It was released by Tooth & Nail Records on May 18, 2006. "We've Only Just Begun" was the first single from the album. The album was produced by James Paul Wisner (Dashboard Confessional, Further Seems Forever, New Found Glory).

"This Is Who We Are is about finding your true sense of self, and then holding on to that with all you have," says guitarist Neil Endicott, "We want people to have something they can listen to that makes them feel better about whatever is going on in their life."

The album was rated 2 out of 5 stars by PunkNews.org.

== Track listing ==
1. "We've Only Just Begun" – 3:34
2. "Move On" – 3:24
3. "Wake Up, Get Up" – 3:39
4. "Sing to Me" – 3:05
5. "The Modern March" – 3:33
6. "The Call Out" – 3:28
7. "This Day of Change" – 3:11
8. "Outline of a Love" – 4:09
9. "Miles and States" – 3:32
10. "I'll Forever Sing" – 4:12

== Album credits ==
- Produced, engineered, and mixed by James Paul Wisner
- Additional guitars, piano, and keyboards by Wisner
- Recorded and mixed at Wisner Productions
- All songs written by Run Kid Run
