= Delete.delete.i.eat.meat =

delete.delete.i.eat.meat

Studio album by Ghostland Observatory
- Released: 2005
- Genre: Electronic, rock, funk
- Length: 40:22
- Label: Trashy Moped Recordings
- Producer: Thomas Turner

Ghostland Observatory chronology
| delete.delete.i.eat.meat (2005) | Paparazzi Lightning (2007) |

delete.delete.i.eat.meat is the debut studio album by Ghostland Observatory. It was released in 2005 by Trashy Moped Recordings.

== Track listing ==
| No. | Title | Length |
|---|---|---|
| 1. | "Candy Rider" | 2:40 |
| 2. | "Shoot'em Down" | 2:49 |
| 3. | "Edge of Town" | 2:45 |
| 4. | "Silver City" | 3:58 |
| 5. | "Cause a Scene" | 3:44 |
| 6. | "Black Box" | 3:43 |
| 7. | "Rich Man" | 2:36 |
| 8. | "Over Again" | 3:44 |
| 9. | "Best Won't Do" | 3:36 |
| 10. | "Victory Lap" | 10:47 |
