= Codename: Rondo =

Studio album by Ghostland Observatory
- Released: October 25, 2010
- Genre: Electro
- Label: Red Green Catalog

Ghostland Observatory chronology
| Robotique Majestique (2008) | Codename: Rondo (2010) |

Professional ratings
Aggregate scores
| Source | Rating |
|---|---|
| Metacritic | 53/100 |
Review scores
| Source | Rating |
| AllMusic | 3/5 stars |
| The A.V. Club | B |
| The Austin Chronicle | 2/5 stars |
| Beats per Minute | 50% |
| Pitchfork Media | 1.5/10 |
| PopMatters | 6/10 |

Codename:Rondo is the fourth studio album by Ghostland Observatory. It was released in 2010 by Red Green Catalog.

== Critical reception ==
The New York Times praised "That's Right," writing that "it’s both a classic pop singalong and, perhaps more innovatively, a stab at giving the blues a futuristic face lift."

== Track listing ==
| No. | Title | Length |
|---|---|---|
| 1. | "Glitter" | 3:08 |
| 2. | "That's Right" | 2:32 |
| 3. | "Miracles" | 2:56 |
| 4. | "Codename: Rondo" | 3:26 |
| 5. | "Give Me the Beat" | 3:29 |
| 6. | "Body Shop" | 3:34 |
| 7. | "Freeze" | 2:42 |
| 8. | "Time" | 3:07 |
| 9. | "Mama" | 3:31 |
| 10. | "Kick Clap Speaker" | 4:51 |
