= Love at the Core =

Studio album by Run Kid Run
- Released: April 29, 2008
- Genre: Pop punk
- Length: 35:37
- Label: Tooth & Nail
- Producer: James Paul Wisner

Run Kid Run chronology
This Is Who We Are (2006)	Love at the Core (2008)	Patterns (2011)

Professional ratings
Review scores
Source	Rating
AllMusic	3.5/5 stars
The Album Project	4/5 stars
Indie Vision Music	(8/10)
Patrol Magazine	(8/10)

Love at the Core is the second album from Run Kid Run, released on April 29, 2008.

== Track listing ==
1. "Rescue Me"- 3:30
2. "Captives Come Home"- 3:44
3. "Fall into the Light"- 2:36
4. "One in a Million"- 3:32
5. "Love at the Core" - 3:34
6. "Sure Shot"- 3:20
7. "My Sweet Escape"- 3:37
8. "The Emergency"- 3:26
9. "Set The Dial"- 3:46
10. "Freedom"- 4:42
