= Paparazzi Lightning =

Studio album by Ghostland Observatory
- Released: 2006
- Genre: Electronic
- Length: 34:42
- Label: Trashy Moped Recordings
- Producer: Thomas Ross Turner

Ghostland Observatory chronology
delete.delete.i.eat.meat (2006)	Paparazzi Lightning (2006)	Robotique Majestique (2008)

Paparazzi Lightning is the second studio album by Ghostland Observatory. It was released in January 2006 by Trashy Moped Recordings.

== Track listing ==
No.	Title	Length
1.	"Piano Man"	3:23
2.	"Ghetto Magnet"	2:25
3.	"Move With Your Lover"	2:46
4.	"All You Rock & Rollers"	2:21
5.	"Vibrate"	3:07
6.	"Sad Sad City"	3:05
7.	"Stranger Lover"	3:39
8.	"Paparazzi Lightning"	4:26
9.	"I'll Be Suzy"	4:26
10.	"Midnight Voyage"	5:04

== Reception ==
Professional ratings
Review scores
Source	Rating
Spin	3.5/5 stars
Stylus Magazine	(B)
