= Other Lives (album) =

Studio album by Other Lives
- Released: April 7, 2009
- Genre: Folk, indie rock
- Length: 42:31
- Label: TBD Records, PIAS Recordings
- Producer: Joey Waronker

Other Lives chronology
Other Lives (EP) (2008)	Other Lives (2009)	Tamer Animals (2011)

Other Lives is the self-titled debut album by American indie rock band Other Lives, released physically on April 7, 2009, by TBD Records and PIAS Recordings and digitally on March 17, 2009.

The lead single "Black Tables" was featured on the 16th episode of season three, "Things Fall Apart" of the television show Ugly Betty, the first episode of season five, "In the Light" of the television show "Covert Affairs", Dream a Little Dream of Me, Part 1 of the television show Grey's Anatomy, and the episode "Every Picture Tells A Story" of the television show One Tree Hill. The song was also featured in the soundtrack of the 2011 comedy-drama film Let Go.

== Critical reception ==
Professional ratings
Review scores
Source	Rating
AllMusic	3.5/5 stars
Everyview.com	8/10 stars

Critical response to Other Lives was generally positive. everyview.com, which gave the album an 8 out of 10, said the album "plays like Parachutes era Coldplay" and "Other Lives produces a tiny gem of a record that couples classical music with indie rock."

== Track listing ==
1. "E Minor" – 3:49
2. "Don't Let Them" – 3:41
3. "Black Tables" – 4:33
4. "End of the Year" – 6:28
5. "Speed Tape" – 4:40
6. "Paper Cities" – 3:51
7. "Matador" – 3:44
8. "It Was the Night" – 4:11
9. "How Could This Be?" – 3:52
10. "AM Theme" – 2:34
11. "Epic" – 3:48
