= Colourmusic =

- Origin: Stillwater, Oklahoma
- Genres: rock, alternative
- Years active: 2005–present
- Labels: Memphis Industries
- Members: Ryan Hendrix; Nick Turner; Nicholas Ley; Colin Fleishacker
- Website: Official website

Colourmusic was started in Stillwater, OK in 2005. Created by Ryan Hendrix and Nick Turner as a music collaboration and quickly evolved into a band when Cory Suter joined. The band became a quintet when Nick Ley and Colin Fleishacker from the band The Bells Are... joined. Colourmusic have been praised for their whimsy and vaguely psych-folk stylings.

== History ==
Ryan Hendrix and Nick Turner met in 1998 when both were attending Oklahoma State University. Turner, a British exchange student, and Hendrix struck up a quick friendship, even though neither one liked the other's musical interests or creative sound. They continued their friendship after Turner returned to the UK and began discussing their musical ideas. Eventually, after many trips to the States, Hendrix and Turner started recording in Hendrix's apartment. Both quickly realized that neither was a very good drummer, and Hendrix's roommate Cory "Cry" Suter was recruited for the job. After making a three-song EP, they started playing some local bars, usually using friends to play live, such as band members from Kunek. Nick Ley and Colin Fleishacker started joining the band for the live performances and they became full-time band members.

The band has played around the Midwest and was seen on The Tonight Show with Jay Leno during Wayne Coyne's Man on the Street segment at South by Southwest when Wayne and the band shot an impromptu musical video. The band most recently opened for The Flaming Lips at Dfest 2007. They can next been seen opening for British Sea Power on the first leg of their US tour.

== Style ==
The band describes themselves as hardcore and a little Oklahoma Sex Rock. They are influenced by Brian Eno, The Beatles, and Serge Gainsbourg, just to name a few. The band has been described as a cross of The Polyphonic Spree and The Flaming Lips but the band states that what really influences them is color. They became interested in Isaac Newton's Theory of Color and Sound and focus their musical styles on a color. That color represents each song. They have produced two EPs called Red and Yellow, each song on the EPs reminding the band of that representative color.

When questioned as to what will come of their album-naming scheme once the traditional red-orange-yellow-green-blue-indigo-violet color spectrum has been exhausted, Ryan was quoted as saying, "It is entirely possible that we will have to expand to non-visible areas of the electromagnetic spectrum. 'Infrared' and 'Ultraviolet' are obvious choices, but we will also examine the marketability of albums named after the other regions. Preliminary focus group results indicate that 'X-Ray' may be a well-received title, and we have begun the search for appropriate cover art. We're excited to report that renowned filmmaker Kevin Smith has already submitted a mammogram for consideration."

The band is also known for the live shows. They usually have a theme such as "The Family Show" where each band member represents a member of the family, and multiple members wearing dresses. They have had Exercise shows, where they work out, as well as being painted on stage by audience members and having their hair and clothes cut off during the show. Currently, the band is dressed in all-white track suits with members from the audience doing artwork on overhead projectors and the band being their canvas.

The band describes the first album as a collection of songs inspired by Isaac Newton’s theory on the relationship of colour and sound.
