= The Rights Workshop =

American music supervision group

The Rights Workshop is a music supervision group based in the Presidio Film Center in San Francisco, California. Formed in 2002 by Billboard Award-winning producer, author and former ESPN Music Director Brooke Wentz, The Rights Workshop programs music and negotiates clearances and licensing rights for producers and directors of independent film, television, advertising, new media, games, apps, as well as services for corporate marketing.

In 2009, The Rights Workshop began representing composers under the label Salty Sounds.

Other ventures include Synklynk, a tool to track music downloads.

== History ==
The company's first client was the mediation of licensing rights for the film Scouts Honor which won three awards at the Sundance Film Festival. The following year, advertising agencies and film makers began using the Rights Workshop for clearance of music rights.

== Film credits ==
Film credits include: Dolores Last Chance U Bill Cunningham: New York Awake Bully Everyman's Journey

- La Mission
- The Devil and Daniel Johnston
- Ballets Russes
- Big River Man
- American Hardcore
- Romántico
- Racing Dreams
- Walt & El Grupo
- Evil Angel
- The Weather Underground

The Rights Workshop represents UK record label TOUCH, Thizz Latin and select composers including Michael 'Narada' Walden and Pyeng Threadgill.

Corporate clients include Microsoft, Nvidia, Oracle, Red Bull, and YouTube superstar Judson Laippley ("The Evolution of Dance", the most downloaded video in 2007).

== Digital rights and new media ==
Proximity to Silicon Valley has resulted in The Rights Workshop becoming increasingly more specialized in digital and new media rights, including programming and supervising music for the RedBana game "Audition", streaming guitar lessons for JamPlay, and Doppelganger's Virtual Lounge.

== Lecture series ==
In 2005 The Rights Workshop produced a series in the SF Film Centre called Sound 'n Cinema in which Wentz hosted the Q&A sessions between directors and producers. These included director Brad Bird with Oscar Award winning composer Michael Giacchino, Sundance Institute Film Program Director Peter Golub with director Michael Lehmann and composer Mark De Gli Antoni, eclectic record producer and SNL musical director Hal Wilner with trumpeter/composer Steve Bernstein, and film composer Marc Capelle with American Music Club singer Mark Eitzel.

In 2007, Hal Leonard published "Hey! That's My Music: Music Supervision, Licensing and Content Acquisition", a comprehensive guide to music licensing and copyright issues written by Wentz and based on her lectures.

In 2009, The Rights Workshop hosted a series of workshops and talks called "Make Music, Make Money."

The Rights Workshop represents Touch and Touch Music whose artists include Oren Ambarchi, Leif Elggren, Christian Fennesz, Soliman Gamil, Hildur Guðnadóttir, Geir Jenssen, Stephan Mathieu, Phill Niblock, BJNilsen (alias Hazard), Rosy Parlane, Peter Rehberg, Carl Michael von Hausswolff, Chris Watson and Jana Winderen, the Thizz Latin label and individual songwriters.
