= Gooding (band) =

Gooding is an American rock band based out of Nashville, Tennessee. They began their formation when Steven Gooding moved to Wichita, Kansas and met current drummer Jesse Reichenberger. Many years later at The University of Kansas, Gooding and Reichenberger met Billy Driver, their future bass player. Since the late 2000s, they have had two fourth members, first Jenny Wood, and currently Erin O'Neill, both of whom were featured on guitar and vocals.

== Members ==
- Steven Gooding – front man, lead guitar, vocals
- Jesse Reichenberger – drums
- Billy Driver – bass, vocals
- Erin O’Neill – guitar, vocals
- Kevin- Drums

== Funding the Future ==
In recent years, Gooding has made it a part of their tours to contribute back to the communities they have received help from in the past, from military bases to Walter Reed Hospital. In the last few years, Gooding has worked to create Funding the Future LIVE, a non-profit charitable organization dedicated to teaching and inspiring children to become financially literate. Gooding has performed at more than 80 high schools, and at the Conference of World Affairs for four years. For their contributions, they were invited to a private tour of the White House.

In April 2015, Gooding was praised by the Wall Street Journal for being a "Trojan Horse" of financial literacy.

== Music ==
The music of Gooding has been featured in more than 200 films, including Walk the Line, Ice Age 2, Iron Man 2; TV shows such as CSI, Portlandia, Cold Case, Numbers, The Closer, Katie, The Good Wife, The Daily Show and The Colbert Report; video games; and commercials for Dodge, Jeep, Chrysler, Marriot, Adobe, and Cisco.

Their singles "Mountain" and "Hey Hey" reached the top 50 in the AAA charts.

Release year	Album name	Producer	Lineup
1998	Winter's Return	Gooding	Gooding
1998	Songs from the unrealized film script Factory Blue	Gooding	Gooding
1999	Disarray	Gooding	Gooding
2000	3X	Gooding	Gooding
2003	Soldiermaking	Gooding and Vivek	Gooding, Billy Driver, Jesse Reichenberger
2005	Angel/Devil	Gooding	Gooding, Billy Driver, Jesse Reichenberger
2010	The Return	Gooding	Gooding, Billy Driver, Jesse Rich
2011	The Sky Eats The Land	Gooding	Gooding, Billy Driver, Jesse Rich
2012	Buffalo	Gooding	Gooding, Billy Driver, Jesse Rich
2014	We Are The Dark Stars	Kendall Stephens	Gooding, Billy Driver, Jesse Rich, Jenny Wood
2015	Live at the Murdock Theatre, Wichita, KS	Gooding	Gooding, Billy Driver, Jesse Rich, Jenny Wood
