= Music Central =

American men's chorus in Oklahoma

- Origin: Oklahoma City, Oklahoma
- Genres: Swing, jazz, gospel, folk, barbershop
- Years active: 1995–2016 (merged)

Music Central was a barbershop chorus formed in 1995 and based in Oklahoma City, Oklahoma. The chorus ranked at the top of its division for most of its first dozen years, and competed internationally in 1999.

The chorus consisted of men from various walks of life who were interested in the barbershop style. Very few of them had formal music training outside Music Central.

In 2016, Music Central merged with the OK Chorale to form the Vocal Sounds of Oklahoma.

== Performance ==
Music Central produced two major performances per year. They also performed for various functions, civic groups, the Boy Scouts of America, and the Arts Council of Oklahoma. Quartets formed within Music Central provided entertainment throughout the year, including the delivery of Singing Valentines on Sweetheart Day. The chorus performed a variety of styles of music from swing, jazz, gospel, folk songs, show tunes, and barbershop.

Music Central was directed by Brian Hogan from 1995 to 2010, and Larry Thomason with Mark Winn from 2011 to 2016. Vocal coaches were also brought in periodically from outside the chorus. Methods and techniques in vocal production were provided to help members grow as a chorus and individual singers.

Music Central sang a variety of different songs and music, including Beach Boys music, music from different musicals, religious, jazz, and many other styles.

== Affiliation ==
Music Central was part of the Barbershop Harmony Society, formerly known as the Society for the Preservation and Encouragement of BarberShop Quartet Singing in America or SPEBSQSA. As part of the Barbershop Harmony Society, Music Central was known as the "Central Cities" chapter within the NorthEast division of the SouthWestern District. They competed at society competitions all around the nation.

== Competition ==
From its inception in 1995, the chorus regularly won its Division Championship, most recently winning the NorthEast division competition on March 3, 2007, in Shreveport, Louisiana and competing at the district level that October in Little Rock, Arkansas. They won the District Championship (covering a five-state area) in 1998, which sent them to the International Barbershop Harmony Society contest the next year. Music Central ranked as one of the top 20 choruses in the Barbershop Harmony Society in 1999.
