= Ghostland Observatory =

Austin, Texas-based electronic duo

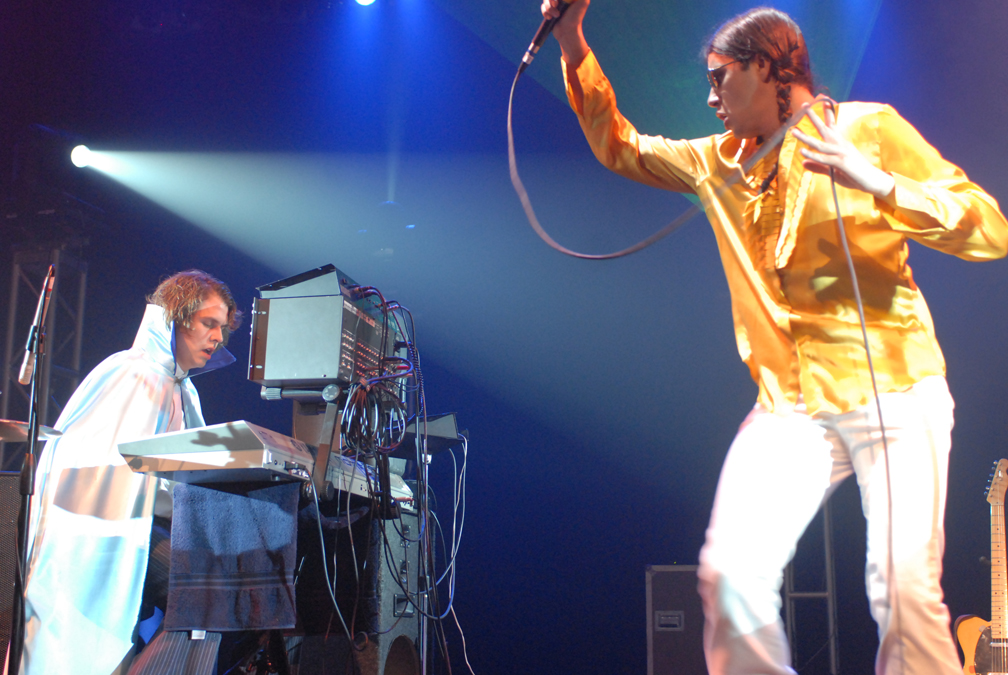
- Ghostland Observatory live at the Hogg Memorial Auditorium, University of Texas at Austin on January 19, 2007.

Background information
- Origin: Austin, Texas, United States
- Genres: Electronic rock, alternative dance, indietronica, electroclash
- Years active: 2004–present
- Labels: Trashy Moped
- Members: Aaron Kyle Behrens; Thomas Ross Turner

Ghostland Observatory is an American music duo based in Austin, Texas, United States. Their music has been described as a combination of electro, rock and funk by Allmusic, and "electro-dance soul rock" by Gothamist.

Front man Aaron Behrens provides vocals in addition to occasionally playing the guitar. Thomas Ross Turner plays the drums or synthesizer.

== History ==
=== 2004-2009 ===
The band released their first full-length album, delete.delete.i.eat.meat, in 2005 on Turner's Trashy Moped Recordings. They also released their second CD, Paparazzi Lightning, on the same label in January 2006. On October 16, 2007, they made their national television debut on NBC's Late Night with Conan O'Brien, performing the song "Sad Sad City". They appeared on Austin City Limits in 2007, and released their first live DVD, Live from Austin, TX on November 13, 2007. In a video shot at the Vegoose Music Festival, they announced their album Robotique Majestique, later released on March 4, 2008. On December 26, 2007, Austin newspaper, the Austin American-Statesman, announced Ghostland Observatory as their band of the year. They performed at the Austin City Limits Music Festival, in Austin, TX in 2006, 2007, and 2009. During the CD release party for Robotique Majestique at the Austin City Music Hall performance of "The Band Marches On", the University of Texas marching band accompanied the duo on stage for a lights out performance. A performance that was replicated at the 2009 ACL show. They have appeared at Coachella in Indio, CA and Voodoo Experience in New Orleans, LA.

=== 2010-2014: Codename: Rondo, hiatus ===
October 26, 2010, saw the release Ghostland Observatory's fourth album, Codename: Rondo, which was introduced with a show at the Cedar Park Center, in Texas, on October 28, 2010. At that time they took the laser show to another level, having 16 lasers and a sophisticated assemblage of mirrors scattered around the stage to produce visual effects in real time usually only seen in movies. On Thursday March 17, 2011, they participated in a friendly battle against Snoop Dogg live at the Red Bull SoundClash on South Padre Island, Texas. On August 13, 2011, they performed at Pacific Festival in Orange County, CA alongside Cut Copy and Steve Aoki. They played in the Beat Tent on night 3 of CounterPoint Music Festival in Fairburn, GA.

On April 10, 2013, they posted on their Facebook page "Yes it is true. We are on hiatus right now. Bathing and relaxing in the cosmos. Rejuvenating our spirits and soaking in the cosmic rays. Much love to all our GLOheads out there. See y'all in the future."

They returned for one show on January 31, 2014, opening for Jurassic 5 at the Icelantic Winter on the Rocks concert at the Red Rocks Amphitheatre.

They also returned to play several shows during South by Southwest (SXSW 2016) in Austin, Texas.

=== 2021: Vultures ===
On April 9, 2021, the duo made a return with the release of their 5th album, Vultures.

== Members ==
- Aaron Kyle Behrens – Born on January 11, 1982, in San Saba, TX. Behrens is the lead vocalist and guitarist. Behrens was previously involved with the band Dismount and Waking Helix (also consisting of Thomas Turner).
- Thomas Ross Turner – Born on August 7, 1979, in Pecos, TX. Turner contributes to background vocals (usually in robotic form), drums, keyboard, and synthesizer.

== Select discography ==
=== Albums ===
- 2005: delete.delete.i.eat.meat (Trashy Moped)
- 2006: Paparazzi Lightning (Trashy Moped)
- 2008: Robotique Majestique (Trashy Moped)
- 2010: Codename: Rondo (Trashy Moped)
- 2018: See You Later Simulator (Trashy Moped)
- 2021: Vultures (Trashy Moped)

=== Extended plays ===
- 2007: Twin Cities (Trashy Moped)
- 2015: Life of the Party (Trashy Moped)
- 2019: Channels (Trashy Moped)

=== Live albums ===
- 2006: Austin City Limits: Music Festival 2006 (Trashy Moped/Austin City Limits)
- 2007: Live At Lollapalooza 2007 (Trashy Moped/Lolla)
- 2007: Austin City Limits: Music Festival 2007 (Trashy Moped/Austin City Limits)

=== DVDs ===
- 2007: Live From Austin TX (New West)

=== Compilations ===
- 2007: KVRX Local Live Volume 11: Assacre To Zookeeper ‒ CD/DVD combo (KVRX)
