= Edison Glass =

American indie rock band

- Joshua Silverberg, in 2005

Background information
- Also known as: Edison, Mannafest
- Origin: Long Island, New York, U.S.
- Genres: Indie rock, pop rock, progressive rock
- Years active: 1998-2008
- Label: Credential
- Members: Joshua Silverberg; Josh Morin; James Usher; Joe Morin

Edison Glass was an American indie rock band from Coram, Long Island, New York, consisting of Joshua Silverberg (singer/guitarist), Josh "Mountain" Morin (singer/bassist), Joe Morin (drummer), and James Usher (guitarist). The band was called Mannafest when it formed in 1998; it was eventually changed to Edison, and later to Edison Glass when they were signed by Credential Recordings in 2004. Their current band name is derived from the names of inventor Thomas Edison and composer Philip Glass.

Edison Glass released their debut album A Burn or a Shiver in 2006 with Credential Recordings, and they released their second album Time is Fiction two years later.

== Discography ==
=== Albums ===
- Downpour (as Mannafest)
- The Solution (as Mannafest)
- Thinking Clearly (as Mannafest)
- A Burn or a Shiver - Credential Recordings (2006)
- Time is Fiction - Credential Recordings (2008)

=== EPs ===
- Starting Over EP (as Edison, and a re-release as Edison Glass)
- Need Speak EP (listening party demo given out to promote A Burn or a Shiver) (2006)
- Let Go EP - Credential Recordings (2007)

=== Demos ===
- The Last Goodbye (2004)

=== Compilations ===
- X Worship 2006 - EMI CMG (2005)
- Stereocilia Vol. 1 - Credential Recordings (2006)
- The Tour EP (2007)

=== Radio singles ===
- "Forever"
- "In Such A State"
- "Let Go"
