= Run Kid Run =

American Christian pop/rock band

- Origin: Carmi, Illinois, U.S.
- Genres: Pop punk, indie rock, Christian rock
- Years active: 2006–present
- Label: Tooth & Nail
- Members: David Josiah Curtis; Neil Endicott; Paul Stewart; Matt Jackson
- Past members: Lyle Chastain
- Website: www.facebook.com/runkidrun

Run Kid Run is a Christian pop/rock band from Carmi, Illinois, and Morganfield, Kentucky, formed in 2006. Their debut album This Is Who We Are, was released on May 18, 2006 through Tooth & Nail Records. All of the members, except Paul Stewart, were originally from punk rock band Side Walk Slam on Tooth & Nail Records. The video for the song "We've Only Just Begun" was featured on the American Eagle music video store soundtrack after its release. The band's second album titled Love at the Core was released on April 29, 2008. Both albums were produced by James Paul Wisner. The song "Freedom" become a hit song on the Christian radio station Air 1. Their work in the studio with Mark Lee Townsend and Matt Thiessen brought forth Patterns, released November 15, 2011.

== Members ==
- David Josiah Curtis – vocals, guitar
- Neil Endicott – guitar, piano, backing vocals
- Paul Stewart – bass
- Matt Jackson – drums

Former

- Lyle Chastain – bass

== Discography ==
=== Albums ===
Title	Year	Label	Chart Positions		
Title	Year	Label	Top 200	US Christian	US Heat
This Is Who We Are	2006	Tooth & Nail Records	–	33	48
Love at the Core	2008	Tooth & Nail Records	–	32	28
Patterns	2011	Tooth & Nail Records	–	–	–

=== Singles ===
Year	Title	Chart Positions			Album
Year	Title	ChristianRock.net; Top 30 of the Week Peak	ChristianRock.net; Annual Top 100	Billboard Hot Christian Songs	Album
2006	"We've Only Just Begun"	5	31		This Is Who We Are
2006	"I'll Forever Sing"	12	56, 73*		This Is Who We Are
2007	"Sing to Me"	3	22		This Is Who We Are
2008	"The Modern March"	1	42, 14**		This Is Who We Are
2008	"Captives Come Home"	1	1		Love at the Core
2008	"Sure Shot"	1	18, 43***		Love at the Core
2009	"Set the Dial"	1	2		Love at the Core
2009	"My Sweet Escape"	1	5	41	Love at the Core
2011	"Back to the Basics"	22			Patterns

* No. 56 in 2006, No. 73 in 2007

** No. 42 in 2007, No. 14 in 2008

*** No. 18 in 2008, No. 43 in 2009

=== Songs featured on compilations ===
Year	Song	Album
2007	"We've Only Just Begun"	X2007
2008	"Captives Come Home"	Tooth & Nail/BEC GMA Sampler 2008
2009	"Sure Shot"	X2009
2009	"One In A Million"	Songs From The Penalty Box Vol. Six
