= Other Lives (band) =

American indie rock band

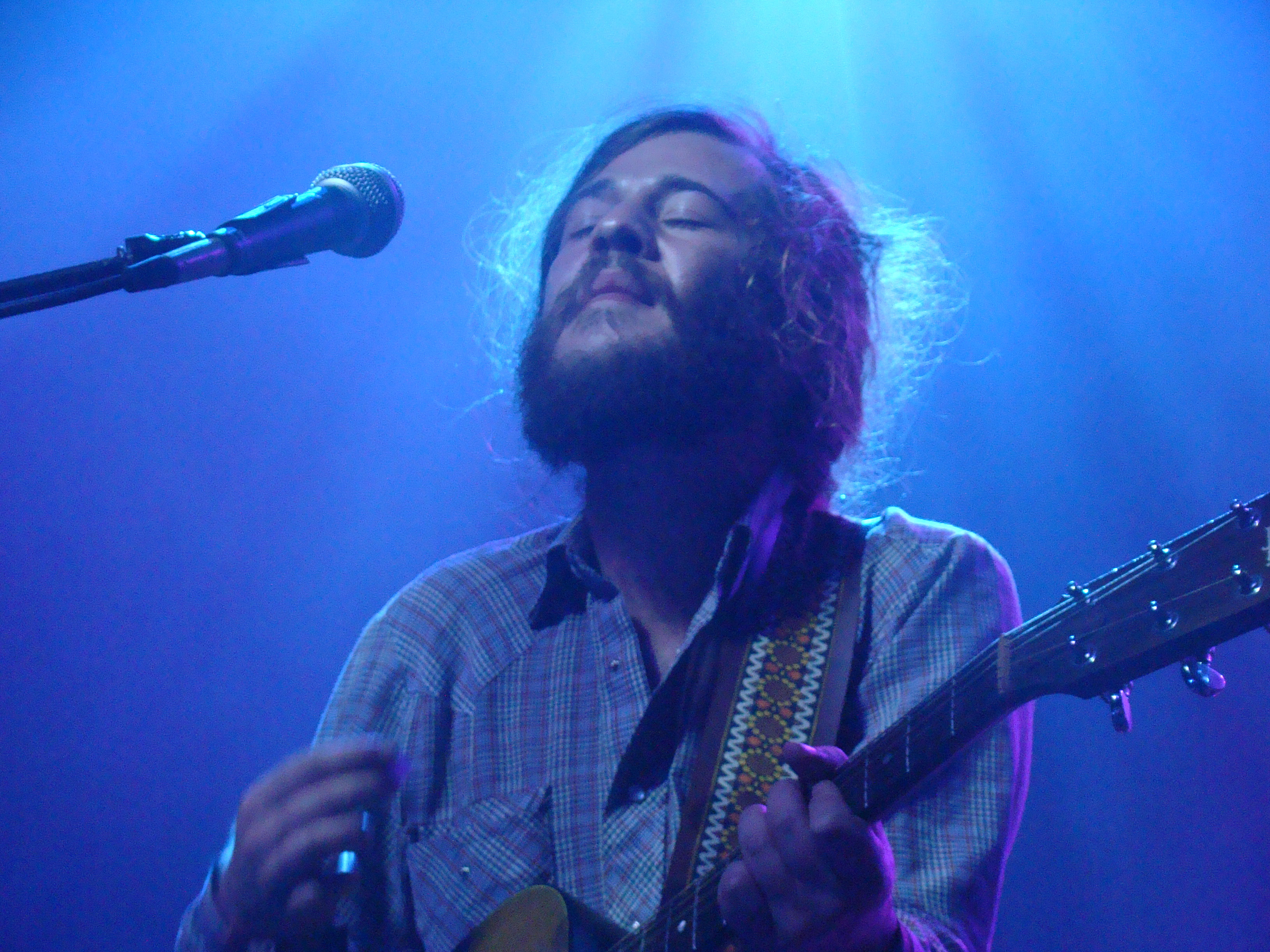
- Singer Jesse Tabish in May 2009.

Background information
- Also known as: Kunek
- Origin: Stillwater, Oklahoma, United States
- Genres: Indie rock
- Years active: 2004–present
- Labels: TBD Records / Play It Again Sam, MapleMusic Recordings (Canada)
- Members: Jonathon Mooney; Josh Onstott; Jesse Tabish; Kim Tabish; Danny Reisch
- Past members: Eric Kiner; Colby Owens; Jenny Hsu
- Website: otherlives.com

Other Lives is an American indie rock band from Stillwater, Oklahoma, United States.

== History ==
The band originally formed in 2004 as Kunek and released one album in 2006 under that name. Other Lives' self-titled album was released physically April 7, 2009 by TBD Records and digitally March 17, 2009. The album was recorded in Los Angeles and produced by Joey Waronker.

According to their official Facebook page current band members are Jesse Tabish (piano, guitar, lead vocals), Jonathon Mooney (piano, guitar, percussion, trumpet) & Josh Onstott (bass, keys, percussion, guitar, backing vocals)

"For 12" was featured as KCRW's "Today's Top Tune" on October 27, 2010.

Other Lives finished working on their album Tamer Animals in February 2011. The album was released on May 10, 2011, in the US and August 29, 2011, in UK/Europe.

In the summer of 2011, the band toured with S. Carey and The Rosebuds. Following a month of shows in the UK, the band joined Bon Iver in September in the US and Canada and played at Iceland Airwaves festival. The band returned to the UK in October to support Chapel Club in London on October 18.

In September 2011, Other Lives launched their Wirewax interactive website, which was built around the band's official video for "For 12", and allowed users to access audio and visual content within the video.

On October 22, 2012, Other Lives' new album, Mind the Gap EP, was released.

In 2012, the band took a hiatus from performing to work on their upcoming album, "Rituals." Over the next few years, Other Lives released the eponymous "Rituals" and "2 Pyramids" as promotional singles before releasing the album on May 4, 2015. "Rituals" marked a departure from TBD Records, as the band instead released their newest album on the Belgian label Play It Again Sam Recordings with the help of co-producer and Atoms For Peace drummer Joey Waronker. In a message about the album on their website, front man Jesse Tabish wrote, "We wanted a cleaner, brighter record with more movement and color." During the eighteen-month period of the album's creation, the group wrote over sixty songs before releasing its current, fourteen track iteration, which runs at fifty-four minutes and eighteen seconds. The album has a notably more somber feel to it than previous works, with AllMusic describing its sound as "shimmery, meticulously crafted . . . pure pop bliss . . . rooted in darkness."

In the summer of 2014, Shearwater drummer Danny Reisch replaced Colby Owens.

The band spent the summer of 2018 recording a new album in Cooper Mountain, Oregon. The album For Their Love was released on April 24, 2020.

Their fifth album Volume V was released on October 10, 2025, by the label Play It Again Sam.

== Discography ==
=== Albums ===
List of albums, with year released and chart positions
Title	Year	Peak chart positions									
Title	Year	US Heat	US Indie	US Rock	BEL (Vl)	BEL (Vl) Heat	BEL (Wa)	BEL (Wa) Heat	FRA	NLD	SWI
Flight of the Flynns (as Kunek)	2006	—	—	—	—	—	—	—	—	—	—
Other Lives EP	2008	—	—	—	—	—	—	—	—	—	—
Other Lives	2009	—	—	—	—	—	—	—	—	—	—
Tamer Animals	2011	111	—	—	—	67	—	45	74	46	—
Mind The Gap EP	2012	—	—	—	—	—	—	—	—	—	—
Rituals	2015	134	77	141	52	—	85	—	132	26	42
For Their Love	2020	—	—	—	87	—	92	—	137	71	28
Volume V	2025										

=== Singles ===
- For 12 (12" vinyl with 2 bonus tracks) (2011)
- For 12 (2 track - UK promo single with edit version) (2011)
- Tamer Animals (2 track - promo single with edit version) (2011)
- Old Statues (2 track - UK promo single with edit version) (2011)

== See also ==
- Danny Reisch
